= Sandersleben (Anh) station =

Railway station in Saxony-Anhalt, Germany

Sandersleben (Anh)
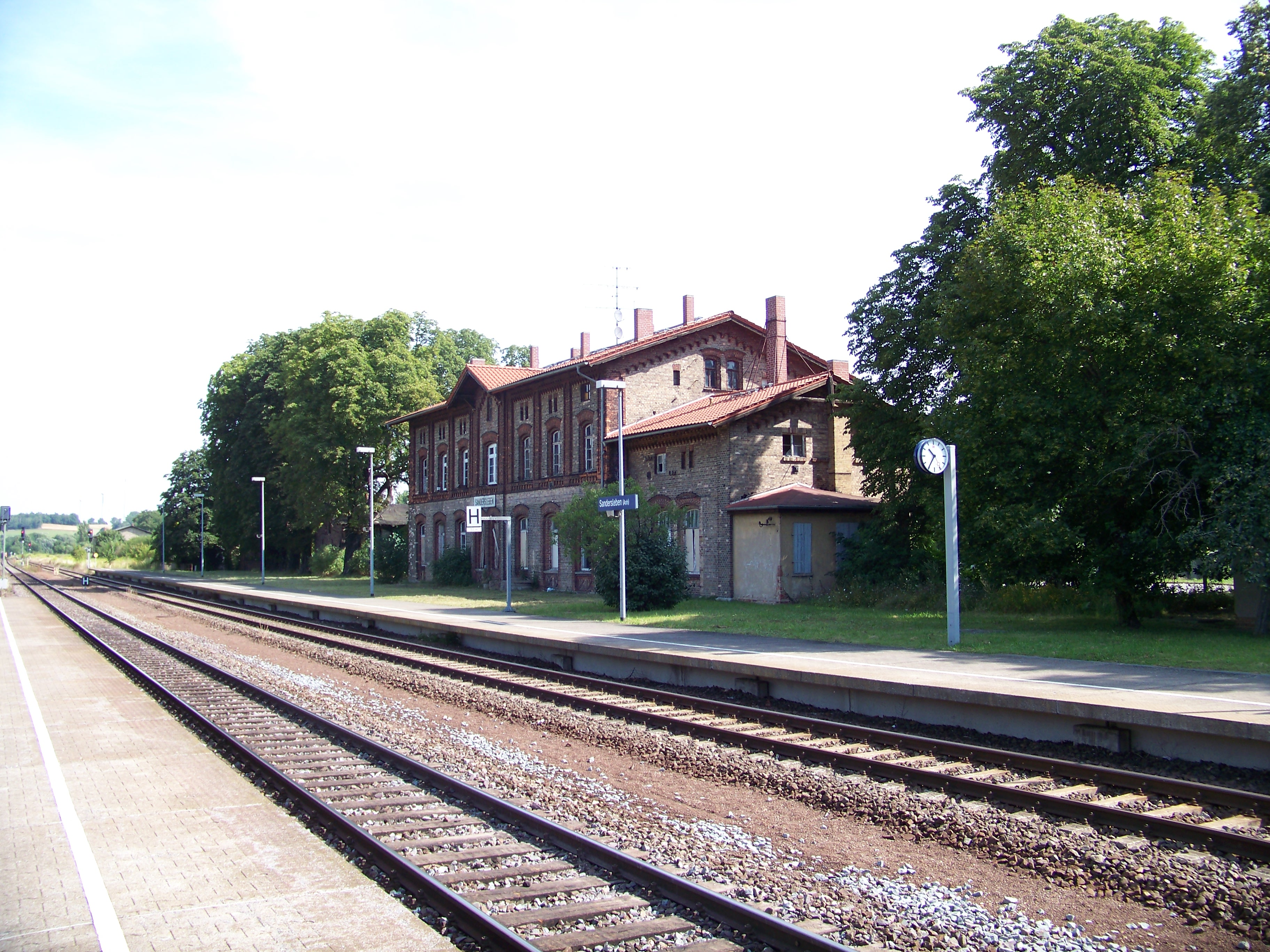
- Entrance building, Halle-Vienenburg side (2009)

General information
- Location: Bahnhofstr. 1, Sandersleben, Saxony-Anhalt; Germany
- Coordinates: 51°40′44″N 11°33′34″E
- Lines: Halle–Vienenburg (km 45.436); Berlin–Blankenheim (km 163.400)
- Platforms: 3

Construction
- Accessible: Yes

Other information
- Station code: 5499
- DS100 code: LSL
- IBNR: 8010311
- Category: 4
- Fare zone: marego: 699
- Website: www.bahnhof.de

History
- Opened: 1871

Services
Preceding station	Abellio Rail Mitteldeutschland	Following station
Aschersleben towards Goslar	RE 4	Könnern towards Halle (Saale) Hbf
Hettstedt towards Erfurt Hbf	RE 10	Güsten towards Magdeburg Hbf
Freckleben towards Halberstadt	RE 24	Belleben towards Halle (Saale) Hbf
Location
- Location within Saxony-Anhalt Location within Germany Location within Europe

Sandersleben station is the station of Sandersleben in the German state of Saxony-Anhalt. It lies at the crossing of the Halle–Vienenburg and the Berlin–Blankenheim railway lines in the municipality of Arnstein and was used to connect between two different concentration camps facilitated by the Nazis.

== Location ==
The station is located in the district of Mansfeld-Südharz near the Harz in southwestern Saxony-Anhalt. The village of Sandersleben has been incorporated in Arnstein since 2010. The station is located in the west of the village near a sports field and the Wipper. In the area of the station there are houses along the railway lines. The Halle–Vienenburg railway run through the eastern part of the station and the Berlin–Blankenheim railway through the western part of the station.

== History ==
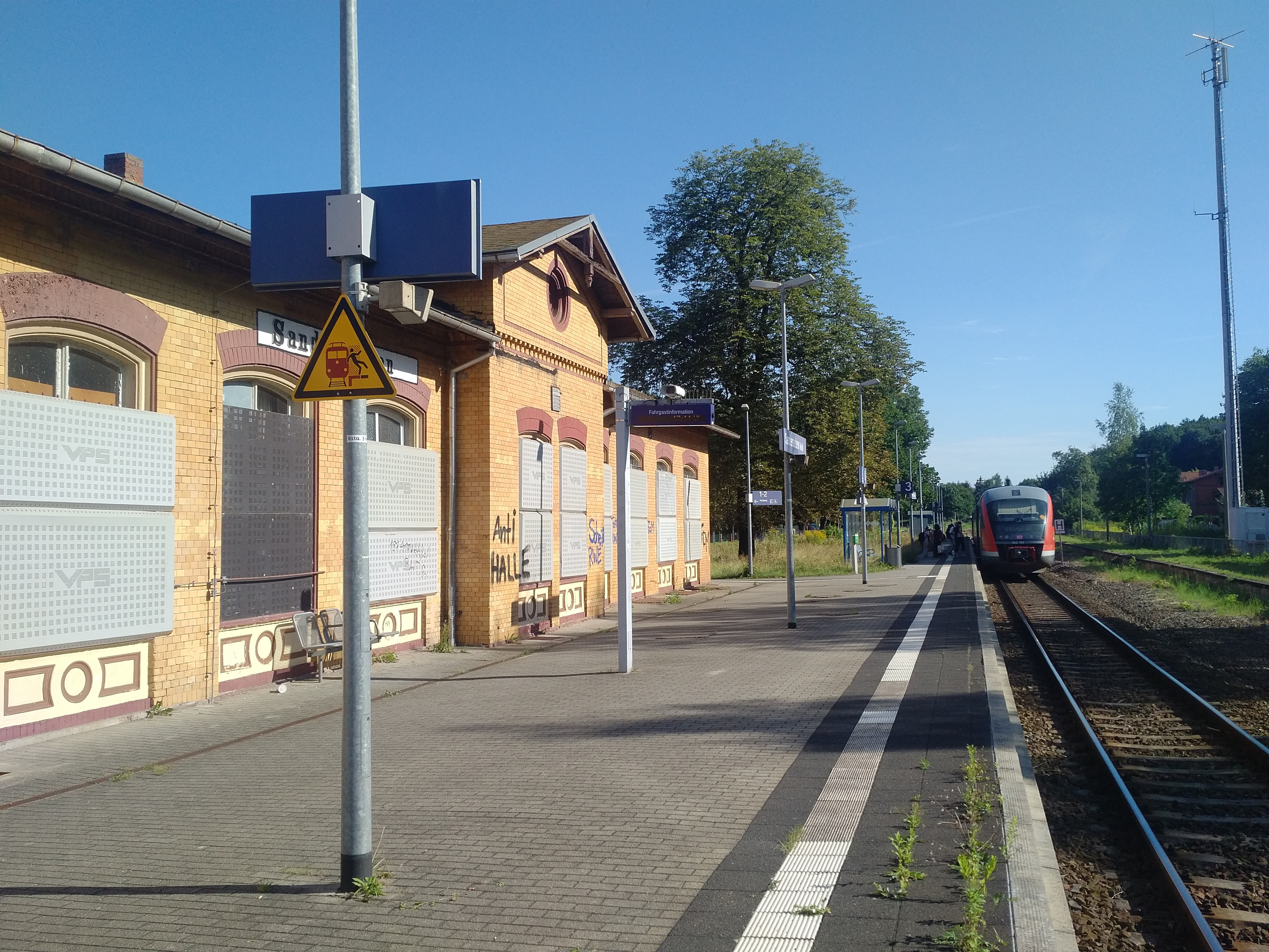
Platform 3 on the Blankenheim side with second entrance building on an island (2017)

The station was opened on 15 October 1871 with the commissioning of the Könnern–Aschersleben section by the Magdeburg–Halberstadt Railway Company (Magdeburg-Halberstädter Eisenbahngesellschaft, MHE). With the construction of the Berlin-Blankenheim railway by the Prussian state railways, a second station was built west of the existing facilities. Since the MHE did not allow the state railway to use its entrance building, it opened its own entrance building on 15 May 1879; this was located to the east of the new line, thus between the two lines. After the nationalisation of the MHE in 1879, the building from 1871 was put to other uses.

In the 1980s, three pairs of express trains and some stopping trains ran between Erfurt and Magdeburg via Sandersleben. At this time, an upgrade of the Berlin-Blankenheim railway was planned to relieve the alternative route via Bitterfeld and Naumburg. This would have catered especially for freight traffic. Electrification of the line was then planned, but it was cancelled after the erection of some catenary masts (for example, south of Sandersleben at Blankenheim).

== Passenger services ==
=== Rail ===
In the 2022 timetable, the following services operate:

Line	Route	Operator
RE 4	Halle – Sandersleben – Aschersleben – Halberstadt – Wernigerode – Vienenburg – Goslar	Abellio Rail Mitteldeutschland
RE 10	Magdeburg Hbf – Güsten – Sandersleben – Sangerhausen – Sömmerda – Erfurt	Abellio Rail Mitteldeutschland
RE 24	Halberstadt – Aschersleben – Sandersleben – Haale	Abellio Rail Mitteldeutschland

=== Buses ===
Bus route 430 of the Verkehrsgesellschaft Südharz (South Harz Transport Company) connects the station with Hettstedt and Eisleben on weekdays at two-hour intervals. In addition, there are a few additional connections, for example to Bernburger Straße in Sandersleben.

== Station precincts ==
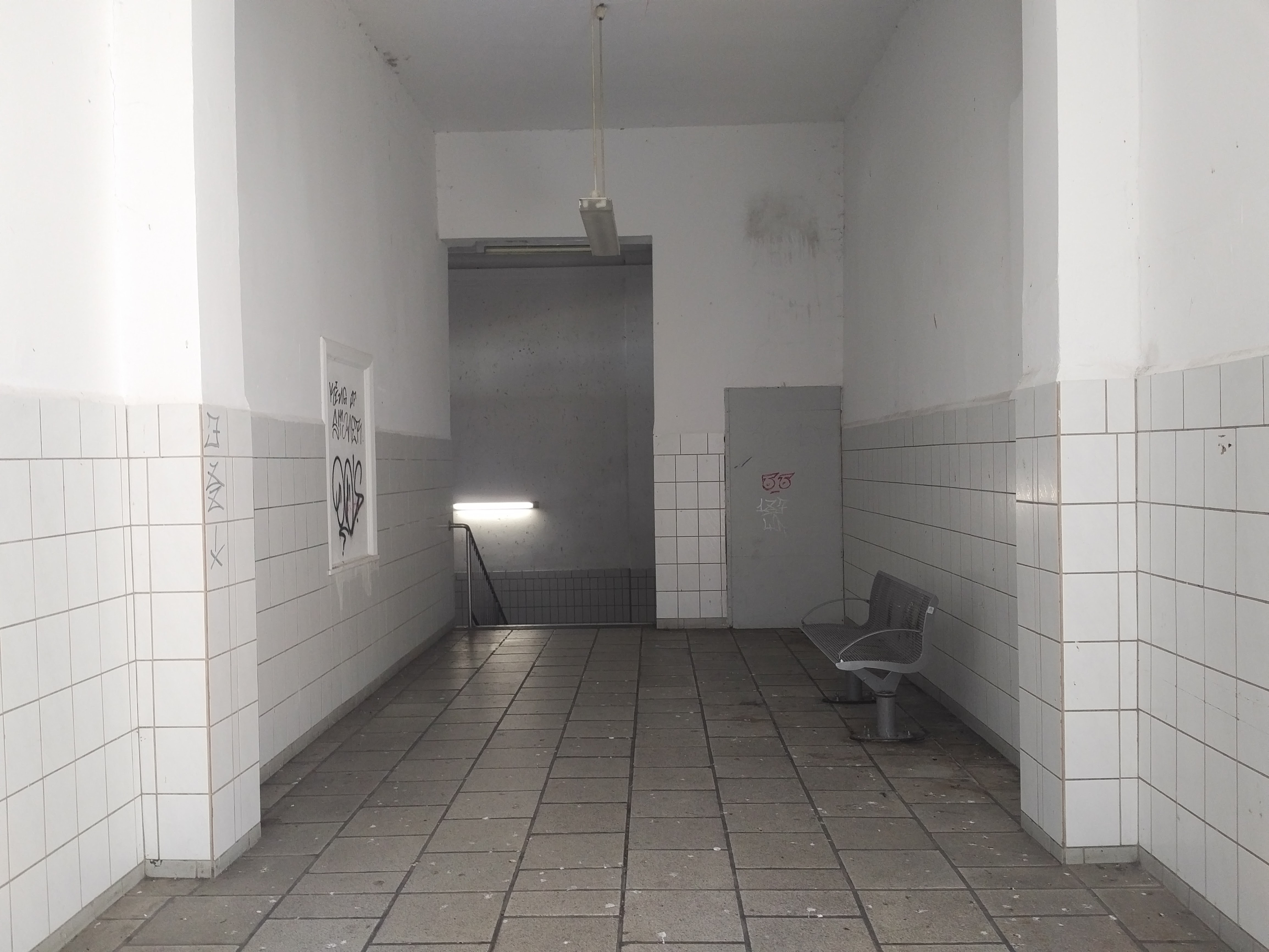
Access to the pedestrian tunnel, 2017

The station is designed as an "island" station, with the track of the Berlin–Blankenheim railway (track 3) lying to the west and the platforms of the Halle–Vienenburg railway (tracks 1 and 2) to the east of the entrance building of the Berlin–Blankenheim railway. The Berlin–Blankenheim railway crosses the Halle–Vienenburg railway to the north of the station. Both lines are connected with each other to the north and south of the entrance building of the Berlin–Blankenheim railway. All tracks have platforms and a pedestrian tunnel connects platforms 1 and 2. The latter is usually no longer used.

The former entrance building of the Magdeburg–Halberstadt Railway Company, which opened the Halle–Vienenburg railway in 1865, stands to the east of platform 2.

Sandersleben station has been upgraded to make it barrier-free.
