= Eichstedt (Altm) station =

Railway station in Eichstedt, Germany

Eichstedt (Altm)

General information
- Location: Eichstedt, Saxony-Anhalt, Germany
- Coordinates: 52°40′29″N 11°51′17″E
- Line: Magdeburg-Wittenberge railway
- Platforms: 2
- Tracks: 2

Services
| Preceding station | Mittelelbe S-Bahn | Following station |
|---|---|---|
| Stendal-Stadtsee towards Schönebeck-Bad Salzelmen | S 1 | Goldbeck (Osterburg) towards Wittenberge |
Location
- Location within Saxony-Anhalt

Eichstedt (Altm) (German: Bahnhof Eichstedt (Altm)) is a railway station in the town of Eichstedt, Saxony-Anhalt, Germany. The station lies on the Magdeburg-Wittenberge railway and the train services are operated by Deutsche Bahn.

== Train services ==
The station is served by the following services:

| Line | Train Type | Route | Operator | Frequency |
|---|---|---|---|---|
| S 1 | S-Bahn | Wittenberge - Eichstedt (Altm) - Stendal - Magdeburg Hbf - Schönebeck (Elbe) - Schönebeck-Salzelmen | S-Bahn Mittelelbe | 1x per hour |
