= List of railway routes in Saxony-Anhalt =

The List of railway routes in Saxony-Anhalt provides a list of regional railway routes in Saxony-Anhalt, central Germany.

== Regional services ==
The following Regional-Express and Regionalbahn services run through Saxony-Anhalt.

Line	Route	KBS	Frequency	Operator	Material
HBX	Berlin Ostbahnhof – Berlin Alexanderplatz – Berlin Friedrichstraße – Berlin Hbf – Berlin Zoologischer Garten – Berlin-Wannsee – Potsdam – Genthin – Burg – Magdeburg Hbf – Magdeburg-Buckau – Osterweddingen – Oschersleben – Nienhagen – Halberstadt – (front portion:) Wegeleben – Ditfurt – Quedlinburg – Neinstedt – Thale Musesteig – Thale Hbf (back portion:) Wernigerode Hbf – Wernigerode Elmowerk – Darlingerode – Ilsenburg – Stapelburg – Vienenburg – Goslar	330, 353, 315, 201, 207,200	3 train pairs per week	Start	Alstom Coradia LINT 41
RE 1	Magdeburg – Brandenburg – Potsdam – Berlin – Frankfurt (Oder) (– Cottbus)	201, 211, 260	60 min (Magdeburg-Brandenburg); 30 min (Brandenburg-Frankfurt)	DB Regio Nordost	Siemens Desiro HC (class 3462)
RE 3	Lutherstadt Wittenberg→ Jüterbog → Ludwigsfelde → Teltow → Berlin-Lichterfelde Ost → Berlin Südkreuz → Berlin Potsdamer Platz → Berlin Hbf → Berlin-Gesundbrunnen → Bernau (b Berlin) → Eberswalde → Angermünde → Prenzlau → Pasewalk → Anklam → Züssow → Greifswald → Stralsund	250; 207; 203	120 min	DB Regio Nordost	class 112 + 5 double-deck coaches
RE 3	Jüterbog → Ludwigsfelde → Teltow → Berlin-Lichterfelde Ost → Berlin Südkreuz → Berlin Potsdamer Platz → Berlin Hbf → Berlin-Gesundbrunnen → Bernau → Eberswalde → Angermünde → Schwedt (Oder)	250; 207; 203	120 min	DB Regio Nordost	class 112 + 5 double-deck coaches
RE 3	Stralsund→ Greifswald → Pasewalk → Angermünde → Eberswalde → Bernau → Berlin-Gesundbrunnen → Berlin Hbf → Berlin Potsdamer Platz → Berlin Südkreuz → Berlin-Lichterfelde Ost → Teltow → Ludwigsfelde → Jüterbog	250; 207; 203	120 min	DB Regio Nordost	class 112 + 5 double-deck coaches
RE 3	Schwedt → Angermünde → Eberswalde → Bernau → Berlin-Gesundbrunnen → Berlin Hbf → Berlin Potsdamer Platz → Berlin Südkreuz → Berlin-Lichterfelde Ost → Teltow → Ludwigsfelde → Jüterbog → Lutherstadt Wittenberg	250; 207; 203	120 min	DB Regio Nordost	class 112 + 5 double-deck coaches
RE 4	Halle Hbf – Könnern – Belleben – Sandersleben – Aschersleben – Frose – Nachterstedt-Hoym – Gatersleben – Halberstadt Hbf – Heudeber-Danstedt – Wernigerode Hbf – Ilsenburg – Vienenburg – Goslar	308	120 min	Start	Alstom Coradia LINT 41
RE 6	Magdeburg – Magdeburg-Neustadt – Haldensleben – Oebisfelde – Wolfsburg	330; 353	Some trains	Start	Alstom Coradia LINT 41
RE 7	Dessau – Roßlau – Jeber-Bergfrieden – Medewitz – Wiesenburg – Bad Belzig – Baitz – Brück – Borkheide – Beelitz-Heilstätten – Seddin – Michendorf – Wilhelmshorst – Potsdam-Rehbrücke – Potsdam Medienstadt Babelsberg – Berlin-Wannsee – Berlin-Charlottenburg – Berlin Zoologischer Garten – Berlin Hauptbahnhof – Berlin Friedrichstraße – Berlin Alexanderplatz – Berlin Ostbahnhof – Berlin Ostkreuz – Königs Wusterhausen – Zeesen – Bestensee – Groß Köris – Halbe – Oderin – Brand Tropical Islands – Schönwalde – Lubolz – Lübben (Spreewald) – Lübbenau (Spreewald) – Calau (Niederlausitz) – Luckaitztal – Altdöbern – Großräschen – Sedlitz Ost – Senftenberg	207; 200; 240	120 min (Dessau-Bad Belzig); 60 min (Bad Belzig–Wünsdorf-Waldstadt)	DB Regio Nordost	Bombardier Talent 2
RE 8	Halle – Röblingen am See – Lutherstadt Eisleben – Wolferode – Sangerhausen – Berga-Kelbra – Nordhausen – Wolkramshausen – Bleicherode Ost – Sollstedt – Leinefelde	590; 600; 611	120 min	Abellio Rail Mitteldeutschland	Bombardier Talent 2
RE 9	Halle – Röblingen am See – Lutherstadt Eisleben – Wolferode – Blankenheim – Sangerhausen – Wallhausen – Bennungen – Roßla – Berga-Kelbra – Görsbach – Heringen – Nordhausen – Wolkramshausen – Bleicherode Ost – Leinefelde – Heilbad Heiligenstadt – Eichenberg – Witzenhausen Nord – Hann. Münden – Kassel-Wilhelmshöhe	590; 600; 611	60 min (Halle-Nordhausen); 120 min (Nordhausen-Kassel)	Abellio Rail Mitteldeutschland	Bombardier Talent 2
RE 10	Magdeburg – Schönebeck (Elbe) – Staßfurt – Güsten – Sandersleben – Hettstedt – Klostermansfeld – Sangerhausen – Oberröblingen – Voigtstedt – Artern – Reinsdorf – Griefstedt – Leubingen – Sömmerda – Großrudestedt – Stotternheim – Erfurt Ost – Erfurt	340; 330; 590; 335; 595	120 min	Start	Alstom Coradia LINT 41
RE 11	Magdeburg – Magdeburg-Buckau – Oschersleben (Bode) – Nienhagen – Halberstadt – Wegeleben – Ditfurt – Quedlinburg – Neinstedt – Thale Musestieg – Thale	315	60 min	Start	Alstom Coradia LINT 41
RE 12	Leipzig – Leipzig-Plagwitz – Leipzig-Knauthain – Groß Dalzig – Pegau – Profen – Zeitz – Wetterzeube – Crossen Ort – Bad Köstritz – Gera-Langenberg – Gera – Gera-Süd – Gera-Zwötzen – Weida –Niederpöllnitz – Triptis – Neustadt – Pößneck ob Bf – Saalfeld	550; 555	120 min	Erfurter Bahn	Stadler Regio-Shuttle RS1
RE 13	Magdeburg – Magdeburg-Neustadt – Biederitz – Königsborn – Gommern – Zerbst – Rodleben – Roßlau – Dessau Hauptbahnhof – Wolfen – Bitterfeld – Delitzsch unterer Bahnhof – Leipzig	201; 254; 251	120 min	DB Regio Südost	Bombardier Talent 2
RE 14	Dessau – Roßlau – Coswig – Lutherstadt Wittenberg-Piesteritz – Lutherstadt Wittenberg Altstadt – Lutherstadt Wittenberg – Lutherstadt Wittenberg-Labetz – Mühlanger – Elster – Jessen – Annaburg – Fermerswalde – Falkenberg (Elster)	228	Some trains	DB Regio Südost	Bombardier Talent 2
RE 15	Leipzig – Leipzig-Möckern – Markranstädt – Bad Dürrenberg – Weißenfels – Naumburg – Bad Kösen – Camburg – Jena Paradies – Jena-Göschwitz – Kahla – Rudolstadt – Rudolstadt-Schwarza – Saalfeld	582; 580; 560	120 min	Abellio Rail Mitteldeutschland	Bombardier Talent 2
RE 16	Erfurt – Weimar – Apolda – Großheringen – Bad Kösen – Naumburg – Weißenfels – Merseburg – Halle	581	60 min	Abellio Rail Mitteldeutschland	Bombardier Talent 2
RE 20	Magdeburg Hauptbahnhof – Magdeburg-Neustadt – Wolmirstedt – Tangerhütte – Stendal – Hohenwulsch – Salzwedel – Schnega – Soltendieck – Wieren – Stederdorf – Uelzen	305	60 min	Bombardier Traxx (class 146) + 3 double-deck coaches	DB Regio Südost
RE 21	Magdeburg – Magdeburg-Buckau – Osterweddingen – Oschersleben – Nienhagen – Halberstadt – Wernigerode – Wernigerode Elmowerk – Darlingerode – Ilsenburg – Stapelburg – Vienenburg – Goslar	315; 330; 353	120 min	Start	Alstom Coradia LINT 41
RE 24	Halle – Könnern – Belleben – Sandersleben – Freckleben – Drohndorf-Meringen – Aschersleben – Gatersleben – Halberstadt	330	120 min	Start	Alstom Coradia LINT 41
RE 30	Magdeburg – Magdeburg-Buckau – Magdeburg Südost – Schönebeck – Schönebeck-Felgeleben – Gnadau – Calbe (Saale) Ost – Sachsendorf – Wulfen – Köthen – Arensdorf – Weißandt-Gölzau – Stumsdorf – Niemberg – Zöberitz – Halle	340	60 min	DB Regio Südost	Class 146 + 3 double-deck coaches
RE 31	Magdeburg – Magdeburg-Buckau – Oschersleben – Nienhagen – Halberstadt – Halberstadt Oststraße – Halberstadt-Spiegelsberge – Langenstein – Börnecke – Blankenburg	315; 328	60 min, 120 min on weekends, 120 mins between Halberstadt and Magdeburg coupled with RE 11	Start	Alstom Coradia LINT 41
RB 25	Halle – Halle-Ammendorf – Schkopau – Merseburg – Leuna Werke Nord – Leuna Werke Süd – Großkorbetha – Weißenfels – Leißling – Naumburg – Bad Kösen – Camburg – Dornbur] – Porstendorf – Jena-Zwätzen – Jena Saalbahnhof – Jena Paradies – Jena-Göschwitz – Rothenstein – Kahla – Orlamünde – Zeutsch – Uhlstädt – Rudolstadt – Rudolstadt-Schwarza – Saalfeld	581; 560	60 min	Abellio Rail Mitteldeutschland	Bombardier Talent 2
RB 33	Stendal - Stendal Vorbahnhof - Bindfelde - Miltern - Tangermünde West - Tangermünde	269	60 min	HANS	Alstom Coradia LINT 27
RB 34	Stendal – Hämerten – Schönhausen (Elbe) – Großwudicke – Rathenow	301	120 min	HANS	Alstom Coradia LINT 27
RB 35	Wolfsburg - Oebisfelde - Miesterhorst - Mieste - Solpke - Gardelegen - Jävenitz - Uchtspringe - Vinzelberg - Möringen (Altm) - Stendal	301	120 min	Start	Siemens Desiro (642)
RB 36	Wolfsburg - Oebisfelde - Bösdorf (Sachs-Anh) - Rätzlingen - Wegenstedt - Flechtingen - Haldensleben - Vahldorf - Groß Ammensleben - Meitzendorf - Barleben - Magdeburg-Eichenweiler - Magdeburg-Neustadt - Magdeburg	308	60 min, 120 min on weekend	Start	Siemens Desiro (642)
RB 40	Braunschweig - Weddel (Braunschw) - Schandelah - Königslutter - Frellstedt - Helmstedt - Marienborn - Wefensleben - Eilsleben (b Magdeburg) - Ovelgünne - Dreileben-Drackenstedt - Ochtmersleben - Wellen (Magdeburg) - Niederndodeleben - Magdeburg-Sudenburg - Magdeburg - Magdeburg-Neustadt - Magdeburg Herrenkrug - Biederitz - Gerwisch - Möser - Burg	260; 310	60 min, 120 min on weekend between Burg and Helmstedt	DB Regio Südost	Bombardier Traxx + 3 double-deck coaches
RB 41	Magdeburg – Schönebeck (Elbe) – Schönebeck-Bad Salzelmen – Eggersdorf – Eickendorf – Förderstedt – Staßfurt – Neundorf – Güsten – Giersleben – Schierstedt – Aschersleben	340; 335; 334	120 min	Start	Alstom Coradia LINT 41
RB 43	Magdeburg – Magdeburg-Buckau – Magdeburg SKET Industriepark – Beyendorf – Dodendorf – Osterweddingen – Langenweddingen – Hadmersleben – Oschersleben	315	120 min	Start	Alstom Coradia LINT 41
RB 44	Halberstadt – Wegeleben – Gatersleben – Nachterstedt-Hoym – Frose – Aschersleben	330	Some trains	Start	Alstom Coradia LINT 41
RB 47	Halle – Halle Steintorbrücke – Halle Dessauer Brücke – Halle Zoo – Halle Wohnstadt Nord – Halle-Trotha – Teicha – Wallwitz – Nauendorf – Domnitz – Könnern – Baalberge – Bernburg-Roschwitz – Bernburg – Bernburg-Waldau – Bernburg-Strenzfeld – Nienburg – Calbe West – Calbe Stadt – Calbe Ost – Schönebeck – Magdeburg-Buckau – Magdeburg	340; 334; 335 on weekend	60 mins, 120 min	Start	Alstom Coradia LINT 41
RB 50	Dessau – Dessau-Alten – Dessau-Mosigkau – Elsnigk (Anh) – Köthen – Frenz – Biendorf – Baalberge – Bernburg-Friedenshall – Bernburg – Ilberstedt – Güsten – Giersleben – Schierstedt – Aschersleben	334	60 min	Start	Alstom Coradia LINT 41
RB 51	Dessau - Roßlau - Meinsdorf - Klieken - Coswig (Anh) - Griebo - Lutherstadt Wittenberg-Piesteritz - Lutherstadt Wittenberg Altstadt - Lutherstadt Wittenberg	254; 216	60 min	DB Regio Südost	Bombardier Talent 2
RB 51	Lutherstadt Wittenberg Hbf - Lutherstadt Wittenberg-Labetz - Mühlanger - Elster (Elbe) - Jessen (Elster) - Annaburg - Fermerswalde - Falkenberg (Elster)	216	120 min, most services on this leg continue from Wittenberg as S 2 to Leipzig-Stötteritz	DB Regio Südost	Bombardier Talent 2
RB 59	Sangerhausen – Artern – Reinsdorf – Bretleben – Heldrungen – Etzleben – Griefstedt – Leubingen – Sömmerda – Großrudestedt – Stotternheim – Erfurt Ost – Erfurt	595	120 min	Abellio Rail Mitteldeutschland	Bombardier Talent 2
RB 76	Weißenfels - Weißenfels West - Langendorf - Prittitz - Teuchern - Deuben (Zeitz) - Luckenau - Theißen - Zeitz	551	60 mins	DB Regio Südost	Alstom Coradia A TER
RB 77	Wangen (Unstrut) - Nebra - Reinsdorf (bei Nebra) - Karsdorf - Kirchscheidungen - Laucha (Unstrut) - Balgstädt - Freyburg (Unstrut) - Kleinjena - Naumburg-Roßbach - Naumburg - Naumburg (Saale) Ost	585; 551	60 mins	Start	Alstom Coradia LINT

== Mitteldeutschland S-Bahn ==
Line	Route	Frequency (min.)
S 2	Jüterbog – Niedergörsdorf – Blönsdorf – Zahna – Bülzig – Zörnigall – Lutherstadt Wittenberg Hbf	Some trains
S 2	Lutherstadt Wittenberg Hbf – Pratau – Bergwitz – Radis – Gräfenhainichen – Burgkemnitz – Muldenstein – Bitterfeld	120
S 2	Dessau Hbf – Dessau Süd – Marke – Raguhn – Jeßnitz (Anh) – Wolfen – Greppin – Bitterfeld	120
S 2	Bitterfeld – Petersroda – Delitzsch unt Bf	30 (Mon–Fri); 60 (Sat+Sun)
S 2	Delitzsch unt Bf – Zschortau – Rackwitz (Leipzig) – Leipzig Messe – L. Essener Straße – Leipzig Nord – Leipzig Hbf (lower) – L. Markt – L. Wilhelm-Leuschner-Platz – L. Bayerischer Bahnhof – L. MDR – L. Völkerschlachtdenkmal – L.-Stötteritz	30
S 3	Halle-Nietleben – Halle-Neustadt – Halle Zscherbener Straße – Halle-Südstadt – Halle-Silberhöhe – Halle Rosengarten – Halle (Saale) Hbf – Halle Messe – Dieskau – Gröbers – Großkugel – Schkeuditz West – Schkeuditz – L.-Lützschena – L.-Wahren – L. Slevogtstraße – L. Olbrichtstraße – L.-Gohlis – Leipzig Hbf (lower) – L. Markt – L. Wilhelm-Leuschner-Platz – L. Bayerischer Bahnhof – L. MDR – L. Völkerschlachtdenkmal – L.-Stötteritz – L. Anger-Crottendorf – Engelsdorf – Borsdorf (Sachs) – Gerichshain – Machern (Sachs) – Altenbach – Bennewitz – Wurzen	30
S 3	Wurzen – Kühren – Dahlen (Sachs) – Oschatz	60 (Mon–Fri) (6.00–8.00, 14.00–18.00)
S 5	Halle (Saale) Hbf – Leipzig/Halle Airport – Leipzig Messe – Leipzig Hbf (lower) – L. Markt – L. Wilhelm-Leuschner-Platz – L. Bayerischer Bahnhof – L. MDR – L.-Connewitz – Markkleeberg Nord – Markkleeberg – Böhlen (Leipzig) – Böhlen Werke – Neukieritzsch – Deutzen – Regis-Breitingen – Treben-Lehma – Altenburg	60
S 5	Altenburg – Lehndorf (Altenburg) – Gößnitz – Ponitz – Crimmitschau – Schweinsburg-Culten – Werdau Nord – Werdau – Steinpleis – Lichtentanne (Sachs) – Zwickau (Sachs) Hbf	120
S 5X	Halle (Saale) Hbf – Leipzig/Halle Airport – Leipzig Messe – Leipzig Hbf (lower) – L. Markt – L. Wilhelm-Leuschner-Platz – L. Bayerischer Bahnhof – L. MDR – L.-Connewitz – Markkleeberg Nord – Markkleeberg – Böhlen (Leipzig) – Altenburg – Lehndorf (Altenburg) – Gößnitz – Ponitz – Crimmitschau – Schweinsburg-Culten – Werdau Nord – Werdau – Steinpleis – Lichtentanne (Sachs) – Zwickau (Sachs) Hbf Only some trains stop in Lehndorf (Altenburg), Ponitz, Schweinsburg-Culten, Werdau Nord, Steinpleis and Lichtentanne (Sachs).	60
S 7	Halle (Saale) Hbf – Halle Rosengarten – Halle-Silberhöhe – Halle-Südstadt – Angersdorf – Zscherben – Teutschenthal Ost – Teutschenthal – Wansleben am See – Amsdorf – Röblingen am See – Erdeborn – Lutherstadt Eisleben	60
S 7	Lutherstadt Eisleben – Wolferode – Blankenheim – Riestedt – Sangerhausen; This line is operated by Abellio Rail Mitteldeutschland.	Some trains
S 8	Jüterbog – Niedergörsdorf – Blönsdorf – Zahna – Bülzig – Zörnigall – Lutherstadt Wittenberg Hbf	Some trains
S 8	Lutherstadt Wittenberg Hbf – Pratau – Bergwitz – Radis – Gräfenhainichen – Burgkemnitz – Muldenstein – Bitterfeld	120
S 8	Dessau Hbf – Dessau Süd – Marke – Raguhn – Jeßnitz (Anh) – Wolfen – Greppin – Bitterfeld	120
S 8	Bitterfeld – Roitzsch – Brehna – Landsberg – Hohenthurm – Halle (Saale) Hbf	30 (Mon–Fri); 60 (Sat+Sun)
S 9	Halle (Saale) Hbf – Peißen – Reußen – Landsberg Süd – Klitschmar – Kyhna – Delitzsch ob Bf – Hohenroda – Krensitz – Kämmereiforst – Eilenburg	120; 60 (peak)
S 11	Halle (Saale) Hbf – Halle-Ammendorf – Schkopau – Merseburg Hbf – Merseburg Bergmannsring – Beuna (Geißeltal) – Frankleben – Braunsbedra Pfännerhall – Braunsbedra – Krumpa – Mücheln (Geißeltal) Stadt – Langeneichstädt – Nemsdorf-Göhrendorf – Querfurt	60
S 47	Halle-Trotha – H. Wohnstadt Nord – H. Zoo – H. Dessauer Brücke – H. Steintorbrücke – Halle (Saale) Hbf	60

Peak hour = 5.00 – 9.00 and 14.00 – 19.00

== S-Bahn Mittelelbe ==
Line	Route	KBS	Frequency	Operator	Material	Image
S 1	Schönebeck-Bad Salzelmen - Schönebeck Süd - Schönebeck (Elbe) - Schönebeck-Frohse - Magdeburg Südost - Magdeburg-Salbke - Magdeburg SKET Industriepark - Magdeburg-Buckau - Magdeburg Hasselbachplatz - Magdeburg Hauptbahnhof - Magdeburg-Neustadt - Magdeburg-Eichenweiler - Magdeburg-Rothensee - Wolmirstedt - Zielitz Ort - Zielitz - Angern-Rogätz - Mahlwinkel - Tangerhütte - Demker - Stendal Hauptbahnhof - Stendal-Stadtsee - Eichstedt (Altm) - Goldbeck (Osterburg) - Osterburg - Seehausen (Altm) - Geestgottberg - Wittenberge	305, 309	1x per hour	DB Regio Südost		

== See also ==
- List of scheduled railway routes in Germany
