= Stendal-Stadtsee station =

Railway station in Stendal, Germany

Stendal Stadtsee

General information
- Location: Körnerstraße; 39576 Stendal; Saxony-Anhalt, Germany
- Coordinates: 52°36′25″N 11°50′14″E
- Owner: DB Netz
- Operator: DB Station&Service
- Lines: Magdeburg–Wittenberge (KBS 305)
- Platforms: 2 side platforms
- Tracks: 2
- Train operators: S-Bahn Mittelelbe

Other information
- Station code: 6013
- DS100 code: LSS
- IBNR: 8010335
- Category: 5
- Website: www.bahnhof.de

Services
Preceding station	Mittelelbe S-Bahn	Following station
Stendal Hbf towards Schönebeck-Bad Salzelmen	S 1	Stendal Hochschule towards Wittenberge
Location
- Location within Saxony-Anhalt

Stendal-Stadtsee (German: Bahnhof Stendal-Stadtsee) is a railway station in the town of Stendal, Saxony-Anhalt, Germany. The station lies on the Magdeburg-Wittenberge railway and the train services are operated by Deutsche Bahn.

== Train services ==
The station is served by the following services:

Line	Train Type	Route	Operator	Frequency
S 1	S-Bahn	Wittenberge - Stendal Hochschule - Stendal-Stadtsee - Stendal - Magdeburg Hbf - Schönebeck (Elbe) - Schönebeck-Salzelmen	S-Bahn Mittelelbe	1x per hour
