= Osterburg station =

Railway station in Osterburg, Germany

Osterburg
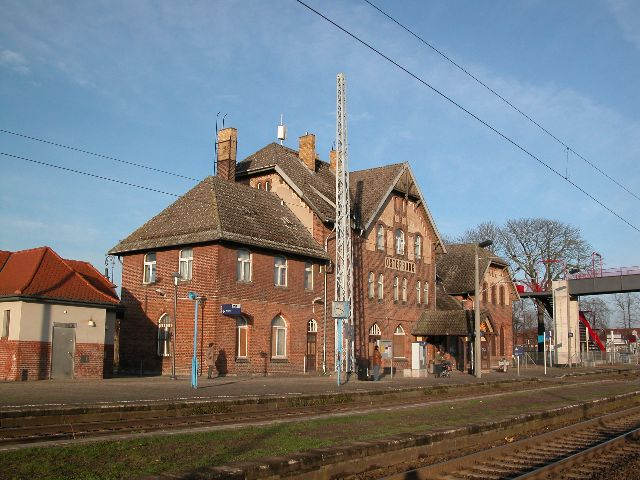

General information
- Location: Osterburg, Saxony-Anhalt, Germany
- Coordinates: 52°47′15″N 11°45′38″E
- Line: Magdeburg-Wittenberge railway
- Platforms: 2
- Tracks: 3

Other information
- Station code: 4789
- DS100 code: LOB
- IBNR: 8012568
- Category: 6
- Website: www.bahnhof.de

Services
Preceding station	Mittelelbe S-Bahn	Following station
Goldbeck (Osterburg) towards Schönebeck-Bad Salzelmen	S 1	Seehausen (Altm) towards Wittenberge
Location
- Location within Saxony-Anhalt

Osterburg (German: Bahnhof Osterburg) is a railway station in the town of Osterburg, Saxony-Anhalt, Germany. The station lies on the Magdeburg-Wittenberge railway and the train services are operated by Deutsche Bahn.

== Train services ==
The station is served by the following services:

- S 1 Wittenberge - Stendal - Magdeburg Hbf - Schönebeck (Elbe) - Schönebeck-Salzelmen
