= Schönebeck Süd station =

Railway station in Germany

Schönebeck Süd

General information
- Location: Moskauer Straße; 39218 Schönebeck (Elbe); Saxony-Anhalt; Germany
- Coordinates: 52.00693°N 11.73764°E
- Owner: DB Netz
- Operator: DB Station&Service
- Lines: Schönebeck–Güsten railway (KBS 335)
- Platforms: 2 side platforms
- Tracks: 2
- Train operators: S-Bahn Mittelelbe

Other information
- Station code: 5646
- DS100 code: LSBS
- IBNR: 8081260
- Category: 6
- Fare zone: marego: 610
- Website: www.bahnhof.de

Services
Preceding station	Mittelelbe S-Bahn	Following station
Schönebeck-Bad Salzelmen Terminus	S 1	Schönebeck (Elbe) towards Wittenberge
Location
- Location within Saxony-Anhalt Location within Germany Location within Europe

Schönebeck Süd station is a railway station in the southern part of the municipality of Schönebeck (Elbe), located in the Salzlandkreis district in Saxony-Anhalt, Germany.
