= Güsten station =

Railway station in Salzandkreis, Saxony-Anhalt

Güsten
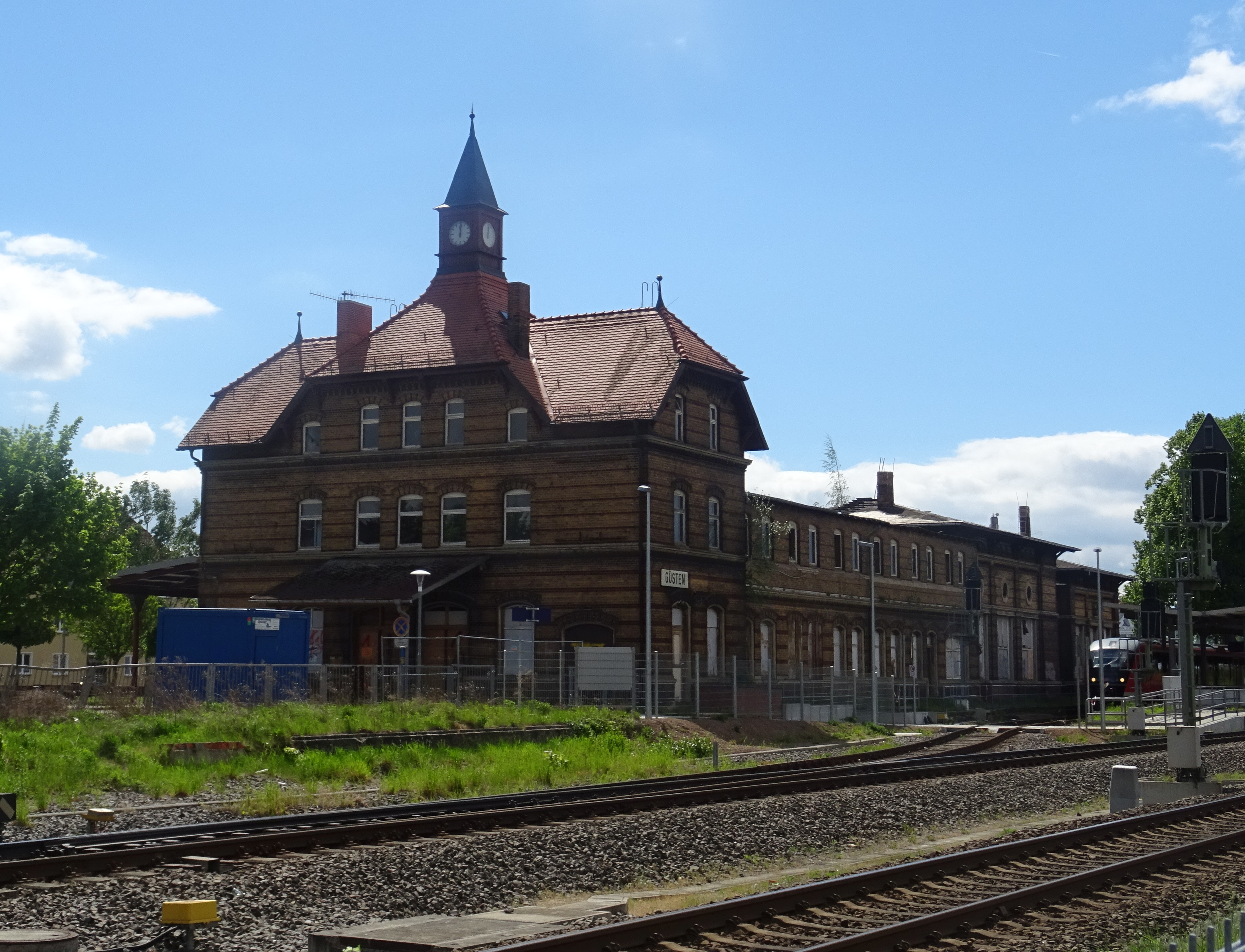
- 2018

General information
- Location: Bahnhofstraße/Wipperstraße; 39439 Güsten; Saxony-Anhalt; Germany
- Coordinates: 51.7932°N 11.6022°E
- System: Bf
- Owner: DB Netz
- Operator: DB Station&Service
- Lines: Köthen–Aschersleben railway (KBS 334); Schönebeck–Güsten railway (KBS 335)
- Platforms: 1 island platform 1 side platform
- Tracks: 3
- Train operators: Abellio Rail Mitteldeutschland

Construction
- Parking: yes
- Cycle facilities: yes
- Accessible: partly

Other information
- Station code: 2428
- DS100 code: LGT
- IBNR: 8010152
- Category: 5
- Fare zone: marego: 655
- Website: www.bahnhof.de

History
- Opened: 10 October 1865; 160 years ago

Services
Preceding station	Abellio Rail Mitteldeutschland	Following station
Sandersleben (Anh) towards Erfurt Hbf	RE 10	Staßfurt towards Magdeburg Hbf
Giersleben towards Aschersleben	RB 41	Neundorf (Anh) towards Magdeburg Hbf
Giersleben towards Aschersleben	RB 50	Ilberstedt towards Dessau Hbf
Location
- Location within Saxony-Anhalt Location within Germany Location within Europe

Güsten station is a railway station in the municipality of Güsten, located in the Salzlandkreis district in Saxony-Anhalt, Germany.
