= Wolmirstedt station =

Railway station in Germany

Wolmirstedt
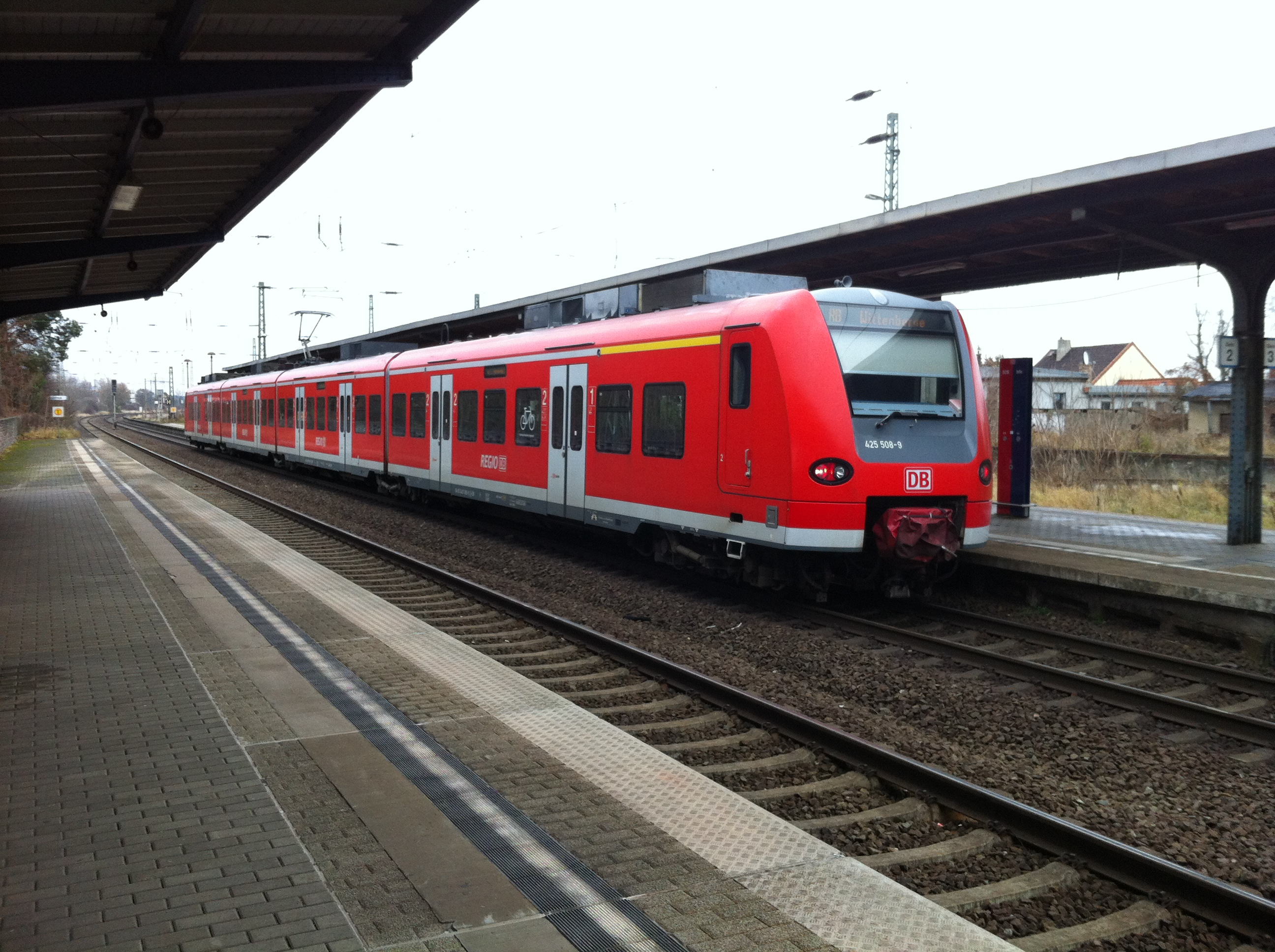
- 2011

General information
- Location: Bahnhofstraße 17; 39326 Wolmirstedt; Saxony-Anhalt; Germany
- Coordinates: 52.2504°N 11.6354°E
- System: Bf
- Owner: DB Netz
- Operator: DB Station&Service
- Lines: Magdeburg-Wittenberge railway (KBS 305); Wolmirstedt–Colbitz light railway
- Platforms: 1 island platform 1 side platform
- Tracks: 3
- Train operators: DB Regio Südost; S-Bahn Mittelelbe

Construction
- Accessible: Yes

Other information
- Station code: 6873
- DS100 code: LWLS
- IBNR: 8013344
- Category: 5
- Fare zone: marego: 310
- Website: www.bahnhof.de

Services
| Preceding station | DB Regio Südost | Following station |
|---|---|---|
| Tangerhütte towards Uelzen | RE 20 | Magdeburg-Neustadt towards Magdeburg Hbf |
| Preceding station | Mittelelbe S-Bahn | Following station |
| Barleber See towards Schönebeck-Bad Salzelmen | S 1 | Zielitz Ort towards Wittenberge |
Location
- Location within Saxony-Anhalt

Wolmirstedt station is a railway station in the municipality of Wolmirstedt, located in the Börde district in Saxony-Anhalt, Germany. It has been under renovation since 2021, to make the station more accessible to disabled people.
