= Goldbeck (Osterburg) station =

Railway station in Goldbeck, Germany

Goldbeck (Kr Osterburg)

General information
- Location: Goldbeck, Saxony-Anhalt, Germany
- Coordinates: 52°42′58″N 11°51′28″E
- Line: Magdeburg-Wittenberge railway
- Platforms: 2
- Tracks: 2

Services
Preceding station	Mittelelbe S-Bahn	Following station
Eichstedt (Altm) towards Schönebeck-Bad Salzelmen	S 1	Osterburg towards Wittenberge
Location
- Location within Saxony-Anhalt

Goldbeck (Kreis Osterburg) (German: Bahnhof Goldbeck (Kreis Osterburg)) is a railway station in the town of Goldbeck, Saxony-Anhalt, Germany. The station lies on the Magdeburg-Wittenberge railway and the train services are operated by Deutsche Bahn.

== Train services ==
The station is served by the following services:

- S 1 Wittenberge - Stendal - Magdeburg Hbf - Schönebeck (Elbe) - Schönebeck-Salzelmen.
