= Staßfurt station =

Railway station in Staßfurt, Germany

Staßfurt

General information
- Location: Zollstraße 16; 39418 Staßfurt; Saxony-Anhalt; Germany
- Coordinates: 51.8513°N 11.5878°E
- System: Bf
- Owner: DB Netz
- Operator: DB Station&Service
- Lines: Schönebeck–Güsten railway (KBS 335); Staßfurt–Blumenberg railway (KBS 317); Staßfurt–Löderburg railway
- Platforms: 1 island platform 1 side platform
- Tracks: 5
- Train operators: Abellio Rail Mitteldeutschland

Construction
- Parking: yes
- Cycle facilities: yes
- Accessible: yes

Other information
- Station code: 5971
- DS100 code: LSF
- IBNR: 8010332
- Category: 5
- Fare zone: marego: 630
- Website: www.bahnhof.de

Services
Preceding station	Abellio Rail Mitteldeutschland	Following station
Güsten towards Erfurt Hbf	RE 10	Schönebeck (Elbe) towards Magdeburg Hbf
Neundorf (Anh) towards Aschersleben	RB 41	Förderstedt towards Magdeburg Hbf
Location
- Location within Saxony-Anhalt Location within Germany Location within Europe

Staßfurt station is a railway station in the municipality of Staßfurt, located in the Salzlandkreis district in Saxony-Anhalt, Germany.
