= Schönebeck (Elbe) station =

Railway station in Schönebeck, Germany

Schönebeck (Elbe)
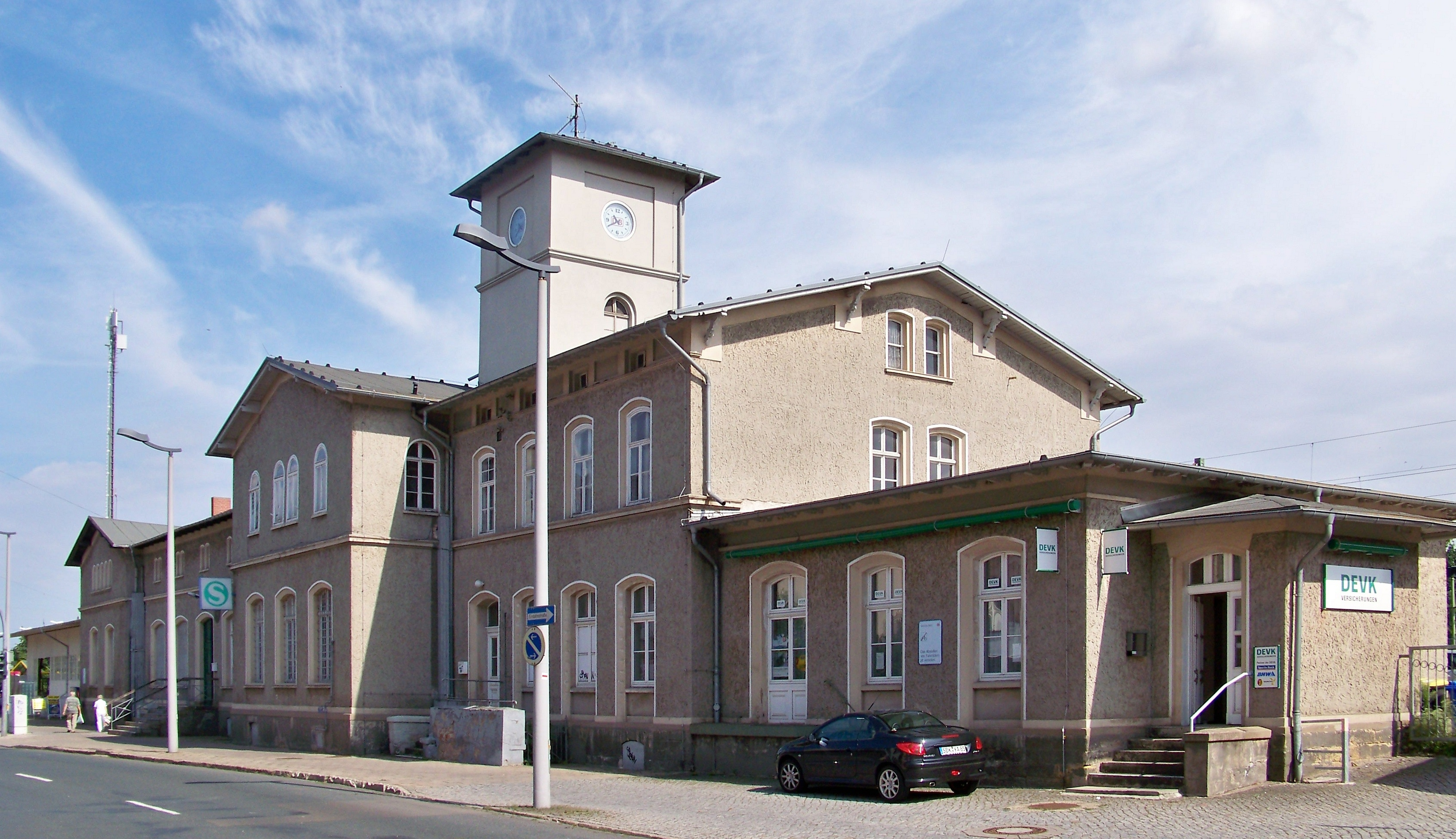
- 2009

General information
- Location: Bahnhofstraße; 39218 Schönebeck (Elbe); Saxony-Anhalt; Germany
- Coordinates: 52.01884°N 11.73304°E
- Owner: DB Netz
- Operator: DB Station&Service
- Lines: Magdeburg–Leipzig railway (KBS 340); Schönebeck–Güsten railway (KBS 335); Schönebeck–Blumenberg railway (KBS 316)
- Platforms: 2 island platforms
- Tracks: 6
- Train operators: Abellio Rail Mitteldeutschland; DB Regio Südost; S-Bahn Mittelelbe

Other information
- Station code: 5645
- DS100 code: LSB
- IBNR: 8010318
- Category: 3
- Fare zone: marego: 610
- Website: www.bahnhof.de

Services
Preceding station	Abellio Rail Mitteldeutschland	Following station
Staßfurt towards Erfurt Hbf	RE 10	Magdeburg-Buckau towards Magdeburg Hbf
Schönebeck-Bad Salzelmen towards Aschersleben	RB 41	Magdeburg-Buckau towards Magdeburg Hbf
Calbe (Saale) Ost towards Halle (Saale) Hbf	RB 47	Magdeburg-Buckau towards Magdeburg Hbf
Preceding station	DB Regio Südost	Following station
Magdeburg Südost towards Magdeburg Hbf	RE 30	Schönebeck-Felgeleben towards Halle (Saale) Hbf
Preceding station	Mittelelbe S-Bahn	Following station
Schönebeck Süd towards Schönebeck-Bad Salzelmen	S 1	Schönebeck-Frohse towards Wittenberge
Location
- Location within Saxony-Anhalt Location within Germany Location within Europe

Schönebeck (Elbe) station is a railway station in the municipality of Schönebeck (Elbe), located in the Salzlandkreis district in Saxony-Anhalt, Germany.
