= Ilsenburg station =

Railway station in Ilsenburg, Germany

Ilsenburg
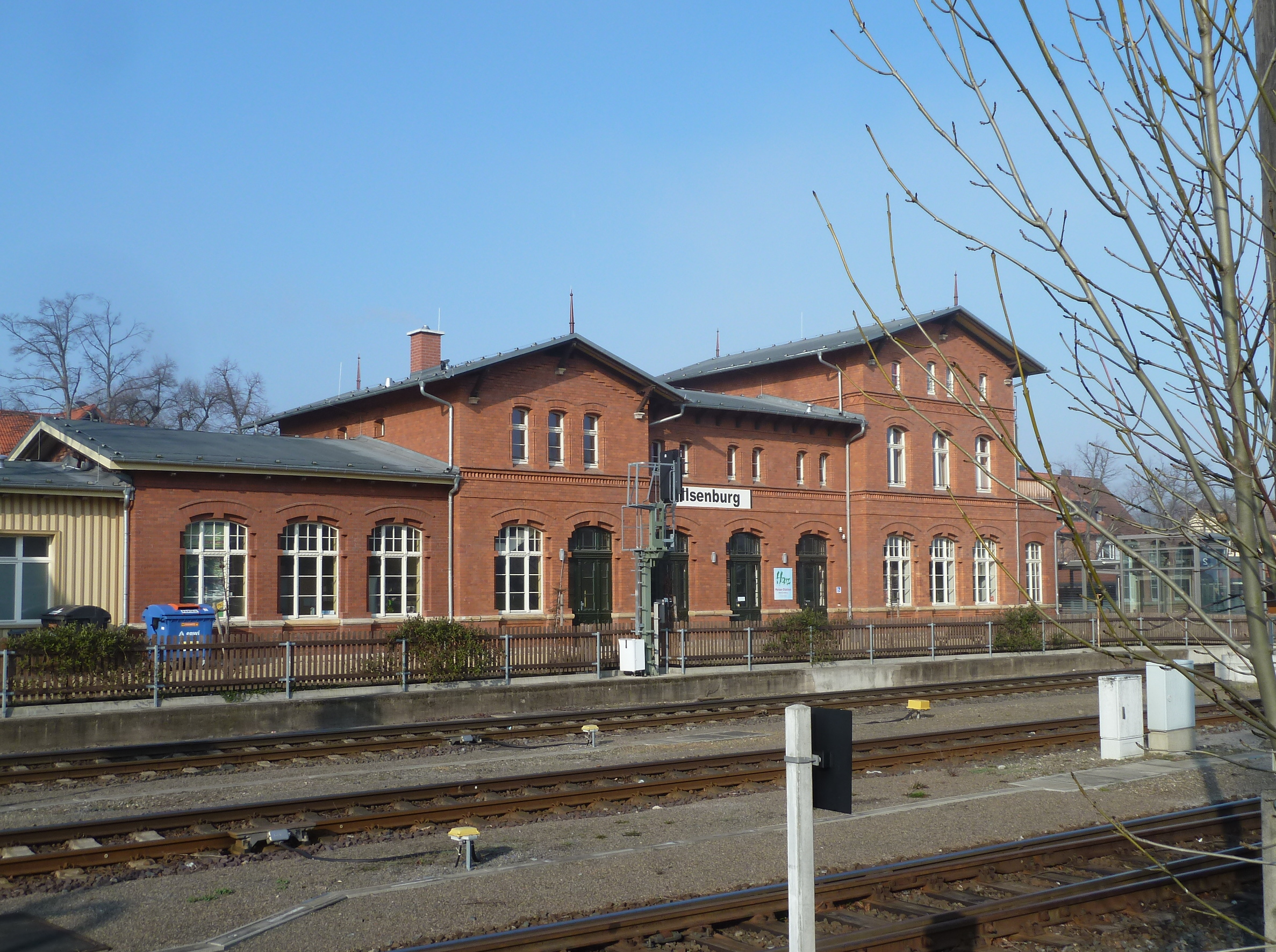
- 2014

General information
- Location: Karl-Marx-Straße; 38871 Ilsenburg; Saxony-Anhalt; Germany
- Coordinates: 51.8693°N 10.6829°E
- Elevation: 237 m (778 ft)
- System: Bf
- Owner: Deutsche Bahn
- Operator: DB Station&Service
- Lines: Heudeber-Danstedt–Bad Harzburg/Vienenburg railway (KBS 330)
- Platforms: 1 island platform
- Tracks: 6
- Train operators: Abellio Rail Mitteldeutschland
- Connections: RE 4RE 21; 270 271

Construction
- Parking: yes
- Cycle facilities: yes
- Accessible: yes

Other information
- Station code: 2980
- DS100 code: LIG
- IBNR: 8011933
- Category: 6
- Website: www.bahnhof.de

Services
Preceding station	Abellio Rail Mitteldeutschland	Following station
Vienenburg towards Goslar	RE 4	Wernigerode Hbf towards Halle (Saale) Hbf
Stapelburg towards Goslar	RE 21	Darlingerode towards Magdeburg Hbf
Location
- Location within Saxony-Anhalt Location within Germany Location within Europe

Ilsenburg station (German: Bahnhof Ilsenburg) is a railway station in the municipality of Ilsenburg, located in the Harz district in Saxony-Anhalt, Germany.
