= Schönebeck-Felgeleben station =

Train station in Schönebeck (Elbe), Germany

Schönebeck-Felgeleben

General information
- Location: Lange Straße/Siedlerstraße; 39218 Schönebeck (Elbe); Saxony-Anhalt; Germany
- Coordinates: 52.00073°N 11.75709°E
- Owner: DB Netz
- Operator: DB Station&Service
- Lines: Magdeburg–Leipzig railway (KBS 340)
- Platforms: 2 side platforms
- Tracks: 2
- Train operators: DB Regio Südost

Other information
- Station code: 5647
- DS100 code: LSBF
- IBNR: 8013465
- Category: 6
- Fare zone: marego: 610
- Website: www.bahnhof.de

Services
Preceding station	DB Regio Südost	Following station
Schönebeck (Elbe) towards Magdeburg Hbf	RE 30	Gnadau towards Halle (Saale) Hbf
Location
- Location within Saxony-Anhalt Location within Germany Location within Europe

Schönebeck-Felgeleben station is a railway station in the Felgeleben district in the municipality of Schönebeck (Elbe), located in the Salzlandkreis district in Saxony-Anhalt, Germany.
