= Wernigerode Hauptbahnhof =

Railway station in Wernigode, Germany

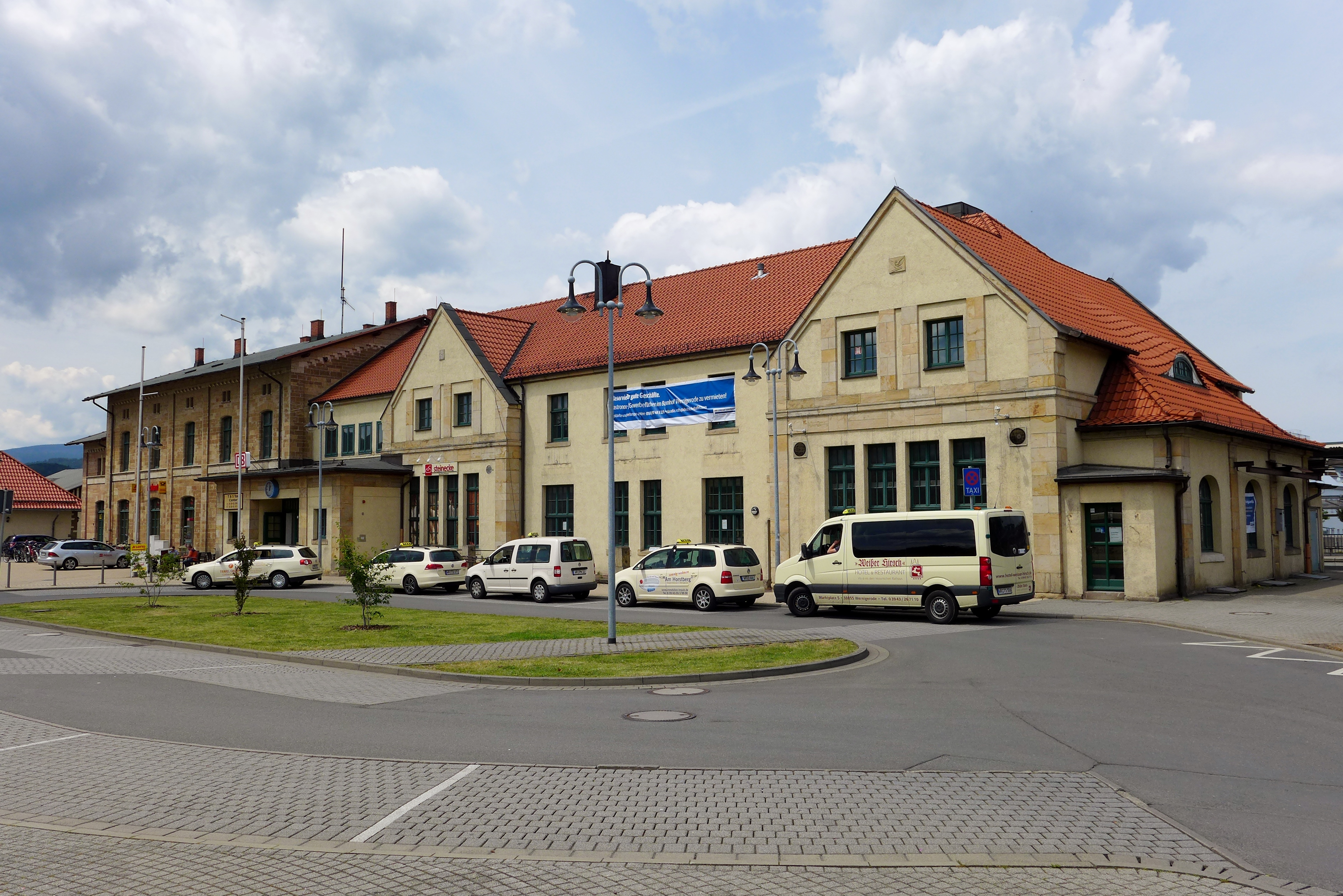
- 2014

General information
- Location: Bahnhofsplatz 1; 38855 Wernigerode; Saxony-Anhalt; Germany
- Coordinates: 51.8401°N 10.7891°E
- Elevation: 234 m (768 ft)
- System: Bf
- Owner: Deutsche Bahn
- Operator: DB Netz; DB Station&Service
- Lines: Heudeber-Danstedt–Bad Harzburg/Vienenburg railway (KBS 330); Harz Railway (narrow gauge) (KBS 325)
- Platforms: 1 island platform 1 side platform + 1 island platform 1 side platform (narrow gauge)
- Tracks: 3 + 3 (narrow gauge)
- Train operators: Abellio Rail Mitteldeutschland; HSB
- Connections: RE 4RE 21; 201 202 203 204 205 230 231 250 260 261 264 265 270 271 272 273 274 275 431

Construction
- Parking: yes
- Cycle facilities: yes
- Accessible: yes

Other information
- Station code: 6692
- DS100 code: LWD
- IBNR: 8010374
- Category: 5
- Website: www.bahnhof.de

Services
Preceding station	Abellio Rail Mitteldeutschland	Following station
Ilsenburg towards Goslar	RE 4	Heudeber-Danstedt towards Halle (Saale) Hbf
Wernigerode Elmowerk towards Goslar	RE 21	Halberstadt towards Magdeburg Hbf
Location
- Location within Saxony-Anhalt Location within Germany Location within Europe

Wernigerode Hauptbahnhof (German: Wernigerode Hauptbahnhof) is a railway station in the municipality of Wernigerode, located in the Harz district in Saxony-Anhalt, Germany.

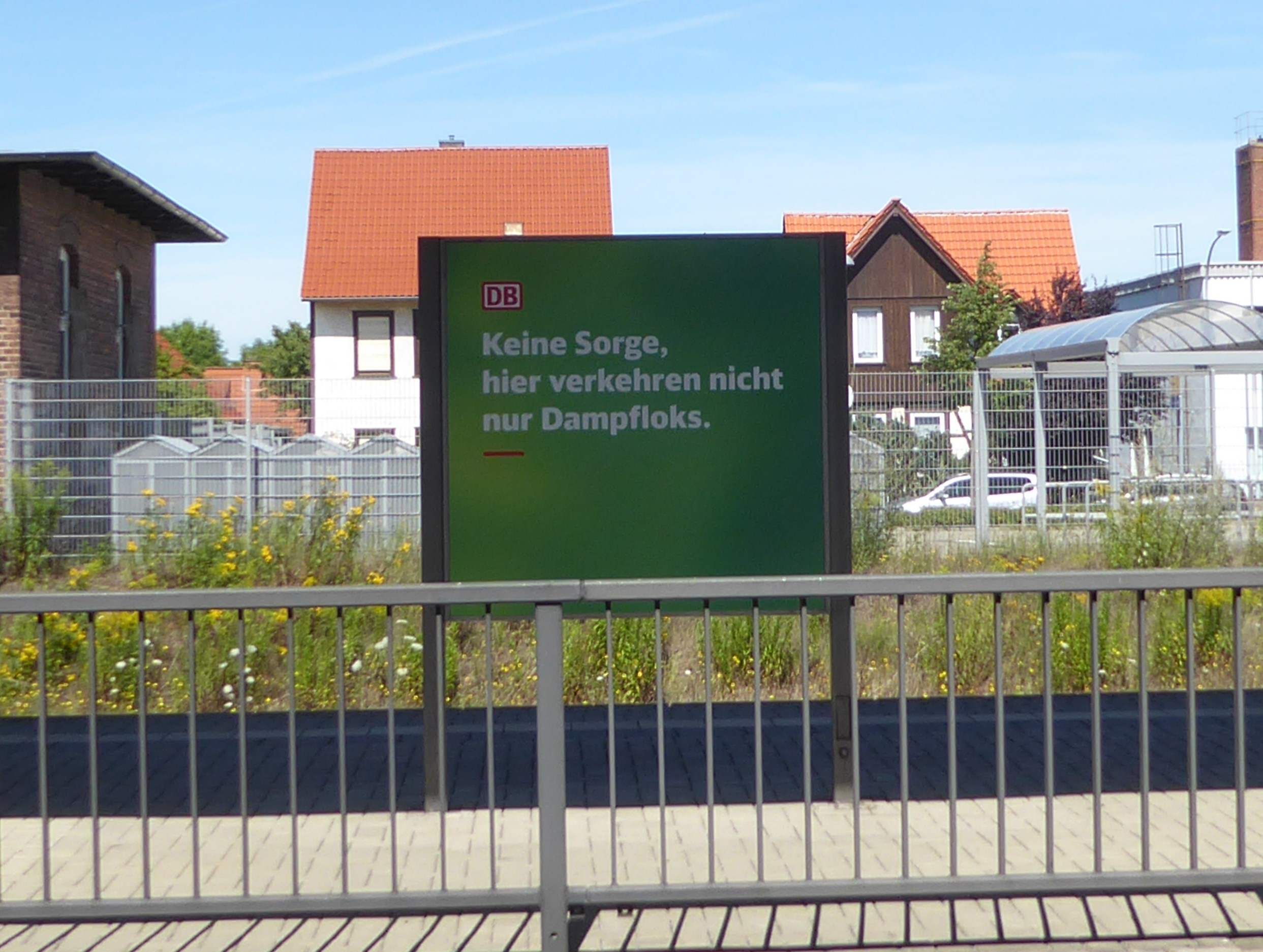
'Keine Sorge - hier verkehren nicht nur Dampfloks' - Deutsche Bahn sign on Wernigerode Hauptbahnhof main line platform

It is a through station on the Magdeburg-Goslar line, and is also the terminus of the Harzquerbahn, housing its headquarters and engine sheds. It thus attracts many steam enthusiasts and visitors to the Brocken.

A bus station is sited to its south-east on Kleine Dammstraße, and a carpark to its north-west, on Feldstraße.

West of the station is a three-level junction. A crossroads between Ochsenteichstraße (B244) and Schlachthofstraße is underground, the mainline and narrow-gauge railways are at ground level, and above them crosses a bicycle and footbridge with a spiral at either end.
