= Gnadau station =

Railway station in Gnadau, Germany

Gnadau
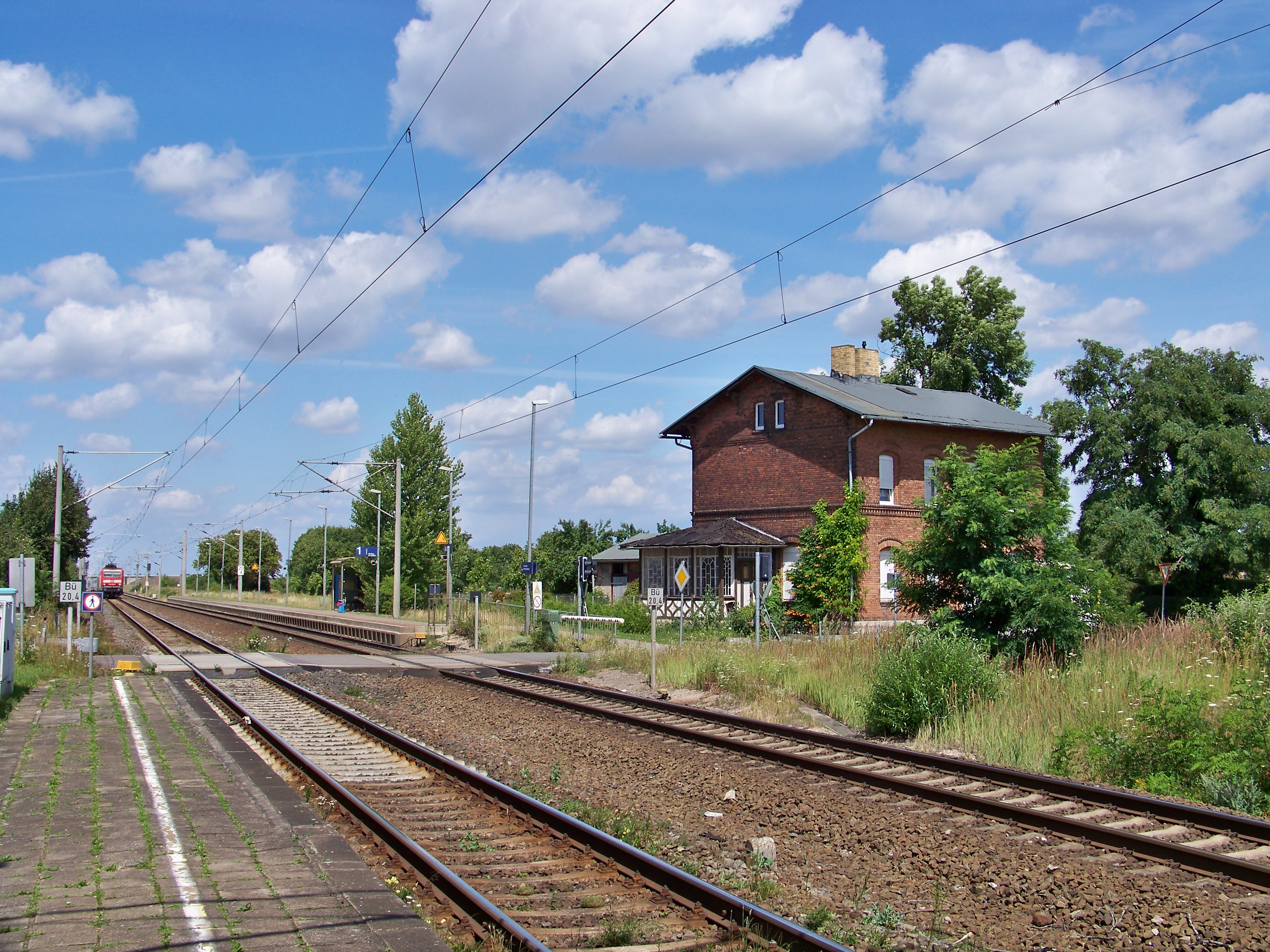
- 2009

General information
- Location: Bahnhofstraße; 39249 Gnadau; Saxony-Anhalt; Germany
- Coordinates: 51.97932°N 11.78148°E
- Owner: DB Netz
- Operator: DB Station&Service
- Lines: Magdeburg–Leipzig railway (KBS 340)
- Platforms: 2 side platforms
- Tracks: 2
- Train operators: DB Regio Südost

Other information
- Station code: 2152
- DS100 code: LGND
- IBNR: 8010084
- Category: 6
- Fare zone: marego: 622
- Website: www.bahnhof.de

Services
Preceding station	DB Regio Südost	Following station
Schönebeck-Felgeleben towards Magdeburg Hbf	RE 30	Calbe (Saale) Ost towards Halle (Saale) Hbf
Location
- Location within Saxony-Anhalt Location within Germany Location within Europe

Gnadau station is a railway station in the municipality of Gnadau, located in the Salzlandkreis district in Saxony-Anhalt, Germany.
