= Halberstadt Hauptbahnhof =

Railway station in Halberstadt, Germany

Halberstadt Hbf
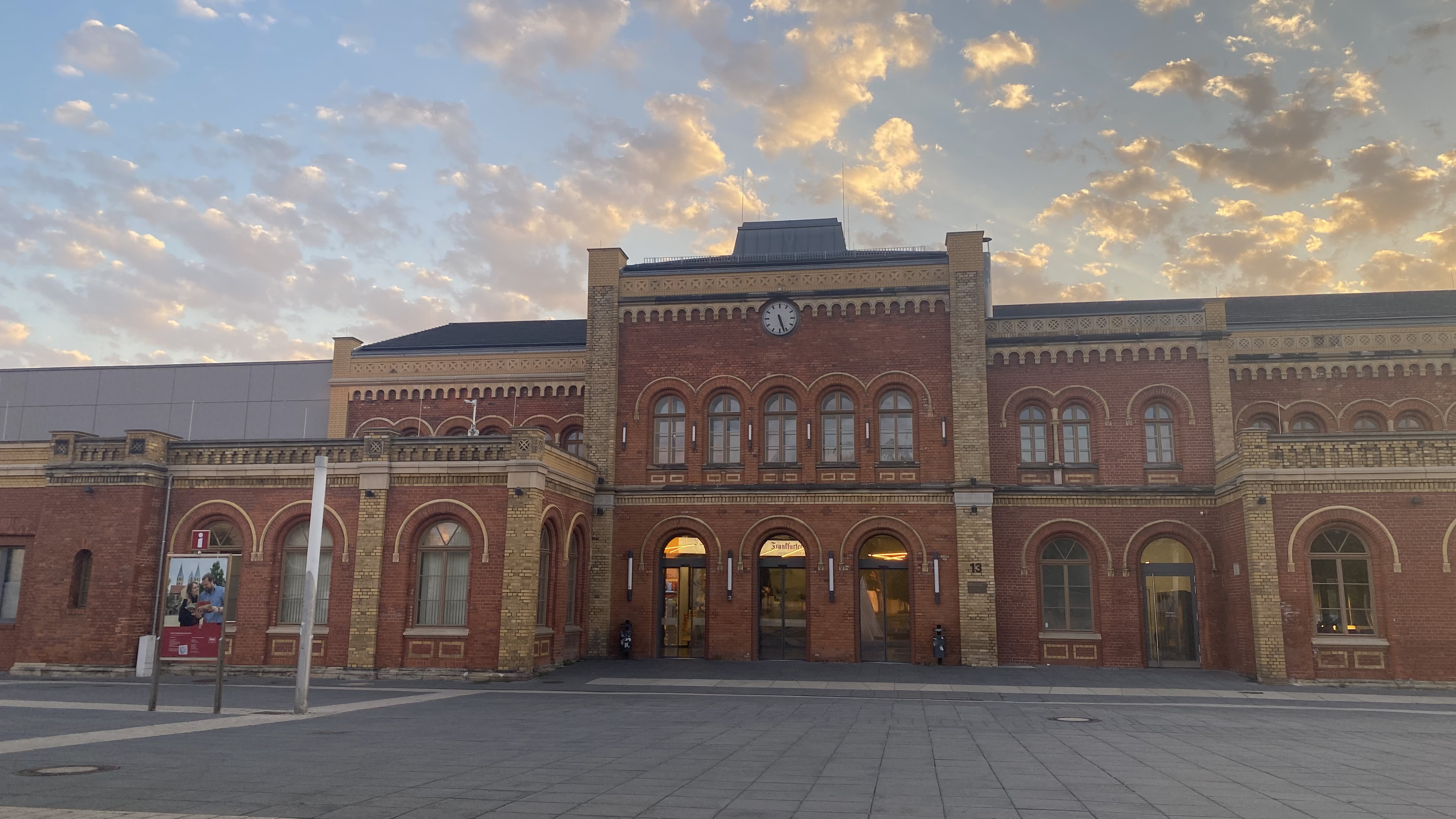
- 2022

General information
- Location: Bahnhofstr. 13, Halberstadt, Saxony-Anhalt; Germany
- Coordinates: 51°53′58″N 11°04′25″E
- Owner: Deutsche Bahn
- Operator: DB Station&Service
- Lines: Halberstadt–Blankenburg; Halle–Vienenburg; Magdeburg–Thale
- Platforms: 5

Construction
- Accessible: Yes

Other information
- Station code: 2490
- DS100 code: LHB
- IBNR: 8010157
- Category: 3
- Website: www.bahnhof.de

History
- Opened: 1868

Services
Preceding station	Start	Following station
Heudeber-Danstedt towards Goslar	RE 4	Gatersleben towards Halle (Saale) Hbf
Wegeleben towards Thale Hbf	RE 11	Nienhagen towards Magdeburg Hbf
Wernigerode Hbf towards Goslar	RE 21	Nienhagen towards Magdeburg Hbf
Terminus	RE 24	Gatersleben towards Halle (Saale) Hbf
Halberstadt Oststraße towards Blankenburg (Harz)	RE 31	Nienhagen towards Magdeburg Hbf
Terminus	RB 44	Wegeleben towards Aschersleben
Location

Halberstadt Hauptbahnhof is the main station on the Magdeburg–Thale railway in Halberstadt in the German state of Saxony-Anhalt. A terminal station was opened in the town in 1843. A new through station was opened in another part of the town in 1868. The first service from Halberstadt ran to Magdeburg. Two more lines were added during the next few decades. In the Second World War, the station suffered heavy damage. Extensive modernisation work took place between 2008 and 2010. The entrance building and the locomotive depot are listed buildings. It received the moniker of "Hauptbahnhof" since 15 December 2024.

== Location ==
The through station, which has existed since 1868, is located in the northeast of the town. It is located on the streets of Hinter dem Personenbahnhof ("behind the passenger station") and Bahnhofstraße ("station street"). The line to Magdeburg branches off about 500 metres to the west, while the line to Thale run directly to the east. The line to Vienenburg runs to the west. A line branches off to the south via Langenstein to Blankenburg.

== History ==
Halberstadt station was opened by the Magdeburg–Halberstadt Railway Company (Magdeburg-Halberstädter Eisenbahngesellschaft) on 21 March 1842. The original station was located on Schützenstraße and had eight tracks. The first freight train ran to the station on 1 July 1843 at about 10 am. It was finally opened for passenger traffic on 15 August. It was designed as a terminal station. Two train pairs ran daily in the first years. Freight operations between Magdeburg, Oschersleben and Halberstadt commenced on 2 January 1844. The section to Thale was built from 1860 and the first train ran on it on 2 June 1864. The regional administration in Magdeburg granted a concession to the Magdeburg–Halberstadt Railway Company to extend the line on 26 November 1860. It started building the extension from Halberstadt via Quedlinburg to Thale on 18 April 1861. The locomotive "Falkenstein" hauled the first train from Halberstadt to Thale on 2 June 1864. A concession was granted for a line via Aschersleben towards Bernburg on 13 April 1864. The line was opened on 10 October 1866. There were now plans to build a through station outside the town. Many Halberstadt citizens did not welcome this idea, but the railway company was able to carry it out.

The station went into operation at its present location as a through station on 1 August 1868 and the line to Vienenburg was opened on 1 March 1869. The old station facilities were used as a freight yard from then on. The first station building was not preserved. After the Prussian state railways took over the Magdeburg–Halberstadt Railway Company, the marshalling yard was extended to 14 tracks. Similarly, a new signal box was built to handle the increasing traffic as a result of line extensions to Halle (Saale) and between Wernigerode and Bad Harzburg. Further extensions occurred between 1904 and 1908, when two new humps, a water tower and the Wehrstedt bridge were built.

Halberstadt became more and more an important railway junction and was at its height in the 1920s. The station precincts extended for 4.8 km in 1939. It had two depots for locomotives, a repair shop, an express freight office and several sidings connecting to local companies.

Halberstadt was bombed by American troops during the Second World War on 7 and 8 April 1945. The commander of a special train operated by the Wehrmacht that was standing in the station forced its locomotive crew to depart from the station, contrary to the general instructions, which indicated that an ammunition train standing at the siding could not be hauled onto the open field of tracks during an air raid. When one of the ammunition train's anti-aircraft guns opened fire, the station was hit by US Air Force fighter-bombers. After the gasometer exploded, the ammunition train was also hit, destroying the station, the offices and adjoining residential and industrial buildings. The resulting crater made the station unusable until the end of the war. During a second raid on 8 April, the western station area, including the repair shop, and the eastern exit was severely hit. A total of 45 locomotives and hundreds of passenger carriages and freight wagons were destroyed and 80% of the track infrastructure was no longer usable. After the beginning of the reconstruction of the railway tracks, the first train ran west again on 19 May 1945. Eastbound operations resumed on 16 June. Until signal boxes Hr1 and HR2 had been restored in 1952, the points had to be set manually using hand switches or keys. Halberstadt came under Soviet administration on 1 July 1945. Trains from Halberstadt ran to the west only to Wernigerode and Stapelburg as the connection over the inner-German border to Vienenburg had been dismantled. Trains from Halberstadt ran to the west only as far as Wernigerode and Stapelburg as the connection over the inner-German border to Vienenburg had been dismantled. Various facilities were repaired up to 1952. Signal box Hr1 operated until 1974.

After the war, only a few essential repairs were made. The increasing freight volume (up to 18,000 tonnes) in the 1950s and 1960s forced a new expansion of facilities. In the area of the old terminal station a new general freight facility was built and a goods shed what added in the Schützenstraße area in 1974. From 1968 to 1970, the entrance building received a curtain wall made of corrugated iron on the occasion of the 20th anniversary of the GDR. Wall tiles were installed in the station building. Due to the corrugated iron wall, the station was often called the Sardinendose (sardine can) in Halberstadt. Parts of this screen could still be seen in 2006.

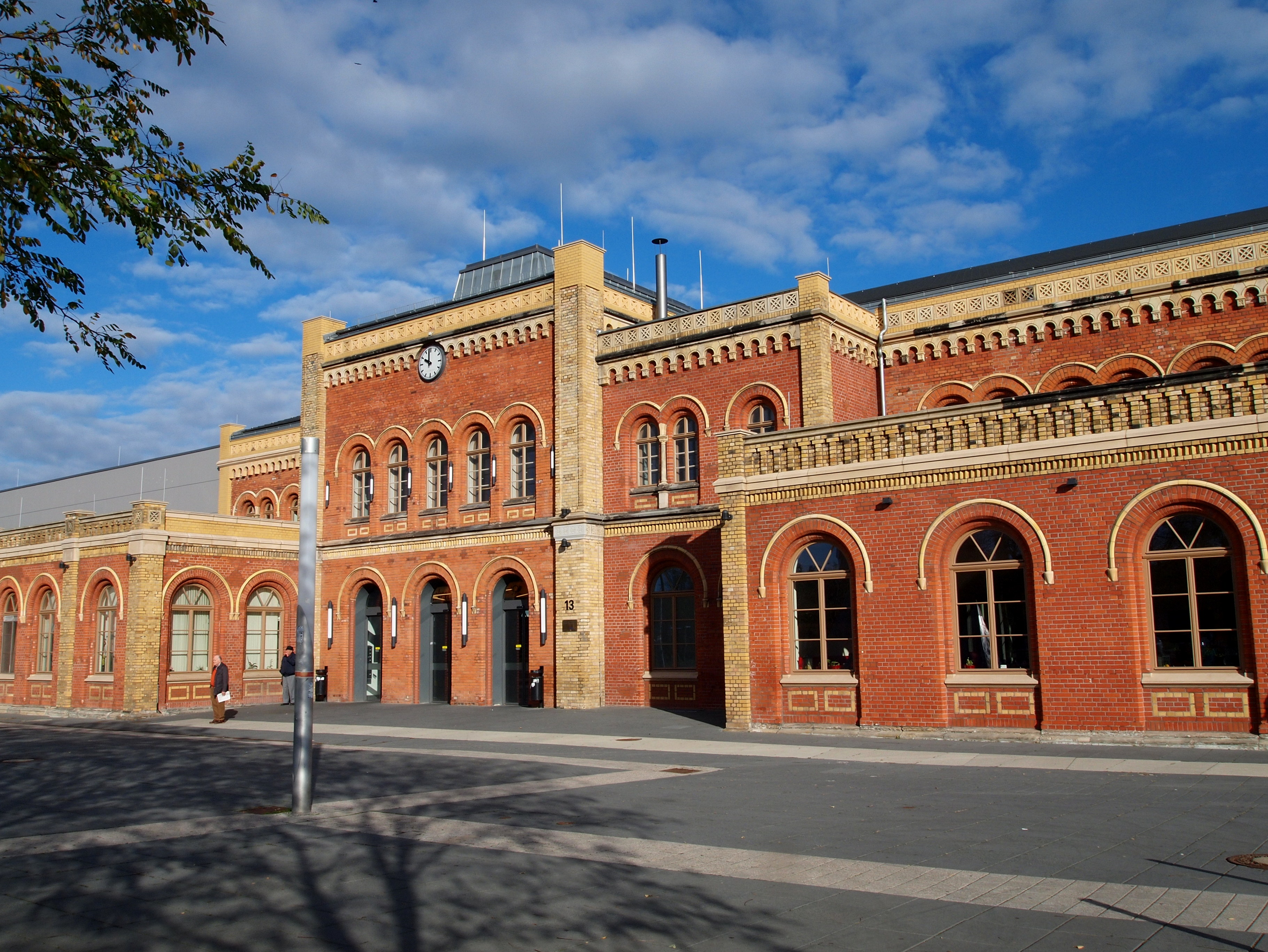
Entrance building (2013)

There were already plans in 2005 for a refurbishment of the entrance building, which would preserve elements of the old building. Rehabilitation and monument protection were mainly funded by private investors. The state of Saxony-Anhalt contributed €10.2 million for the construction project. The first work began in August 2008. The building was acquired in 2008 by NOSA GmbH, a holding company owned by the town of Halberstadt. The station forecourt was redesigned, the bus station was relocated and the tram stop was rebuilt. The sheet metal facade was removed and the buildings were almost completely gutted. The entrance building was completed in August 2010 and the formal opening took place on 15 August. The cost of the actual conversion was around €8.2 million. Several shops are located there.

On 29 August 2011, the station was awarded the title of station of the year in the small town station category. Since 2014, the station has been designated as a Kulturbahnhof (cultural station).

About 3,350 passengers per day were counted at the station in 2011.

Starting 15 December 2024, alongside Eisenach Hauptbahnhof, Deutsche Bahn officially changed Halberstadt station's name to Halberstadt Hauptbahnhof (Hbf).

== Infrastructure ==
=== Platforms and tracks ===
Halberstadt station had two platforms in 1950. The second platform was an island platform, which was 312 metres long. The first platform, lying directly next to the entrance building, was much longer than the second one. There was still a third transit track between the two platforms. There were also two platforms in 1981. The station had 157 sets of points and three humps for marshalling. The station now has a total of five platform tracks. They are numbered from 1 to 5. Platform 1 is 320 metres long. The other platforms have a length of 120 metres.

=== Locomotive depot ===
The locomotive depot existed in Halberstadt until 2003. Very large stocks of DR class 50.35 locomotives were based there. It was one of the last steam locomotive depots of Deutsche Reichsbahn.

== Rail services ==
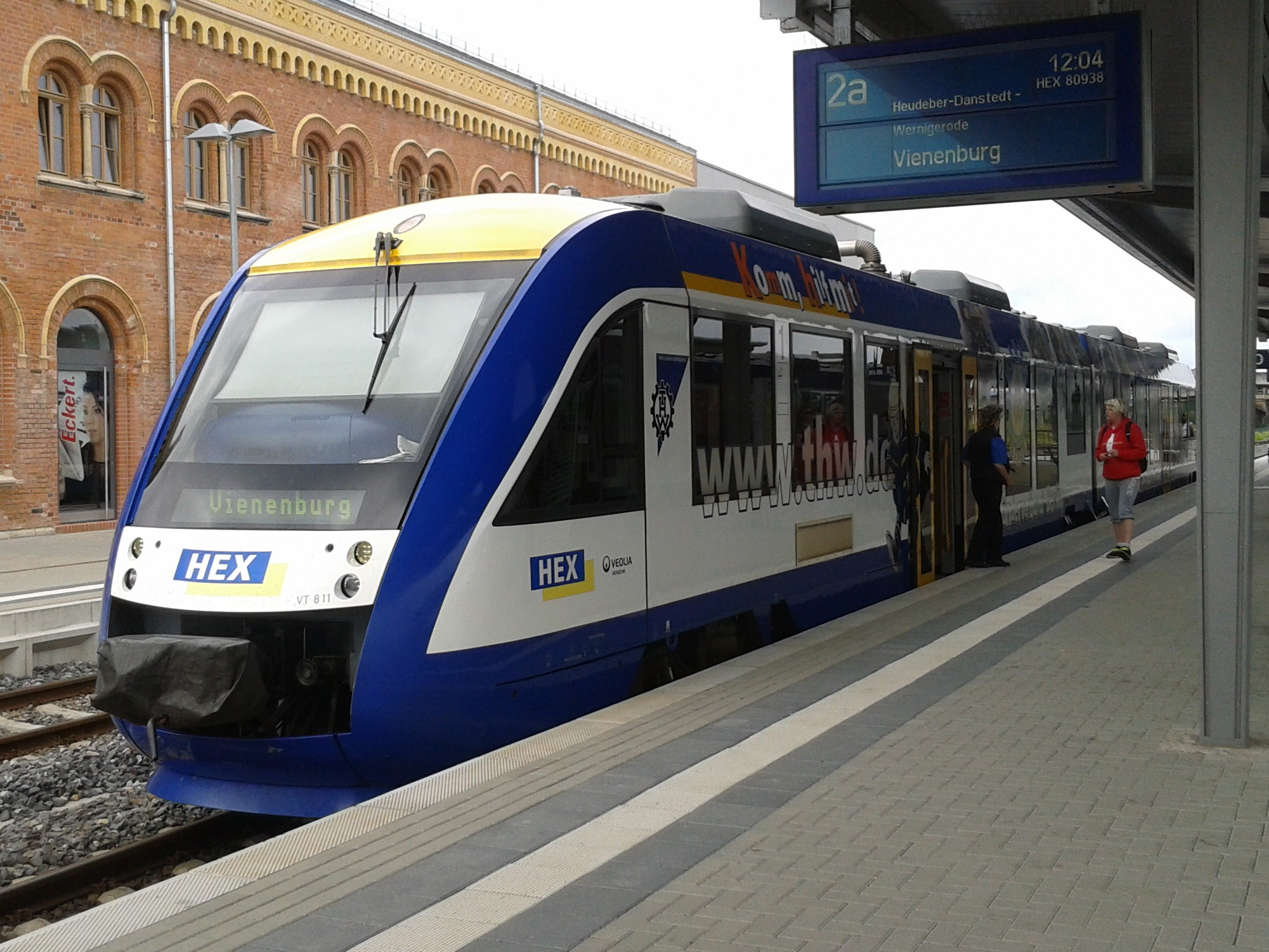
Train to Vienenburg (2011)

=== Regional services ===
Only Regionalverkehre Start Deutschland trains stop in Halberstadt. Before December 2024 these services were operated by Abellio Rail Mitteldeutschland. Only Alstom Coradia LINT diesel multiple units (class 1648) have been used since 9 December 2018. Previously class 612, 640 and Siemens Desiro Classic (class 642) DMUs were used. For many years, there has been a direct connection to Potsdam and Berlin on the weekend.

In the timetable for 2025, Halberstadt Hauptbahnhof was served by the following services:

Line	Route	Interval (min)
HBX	Berlin – Potsdam – Magdeburg – Halberstadt – (portion) Goslar / Thale	3 train pairs per week
RE 4	Halle (Saale) – Aschersleben – Halberstadt –Wernigerode – Vienenburg – Goslar	120
RE 11	Magdeburg – Oschersleben (Bode) – Halberstadt – Quedlinburg – Thale	60
RE 21	Magdeburg – Oschersleben (Bode) – Halberstadt – Wernigerode – Vienenburg – Goslar	120
RE 24	Halle (Saale) – Könnern – Aschersleben – Gatersleben – Halberstadt	120
RE 31	Magdeburg – Oschersleben (Bode) – Halberstadt – Langenstein – Blankenburg (Harz)	120 (Magdeburg–Halberstadt); 60 (Halberstadt–Blankenburg)
RB 44	Halberstadt – Gatersleben – Aschersleben	Some trains

=== Local services ===
Two tram lines, two bus routes and a night bus route, which runs to the main districts from 20:00 to about 22:30, are operated by Halberstädter Verkehrs-GmbH (the municipal transport company), stopping in the station forecourt. In addition, southeast of the station is the bus station, from which nine regional bus lines and four demand-responsive services are operated by Harzer Verkehrsbetriebe, the transport company of the Harz district. Bus route 203 of the state of Saxony-Anhalt runs hourly to Osterwieck via Dardesheim and continues every two hours to Vienenburg. This service was established after the cancellation of the trains on the Heudeber-Danstedt–Osterwieck line.

=== Private transport ===
The station provides 157 car parking spaces and 20 bicycle parking spaces. A charging station has been installed for electric cars.
