= Schönebeck-Bad Salzelmen station =

Railway station in Schönebeck (Elbe), Germany

Schönebeck-Bad Salzelmen
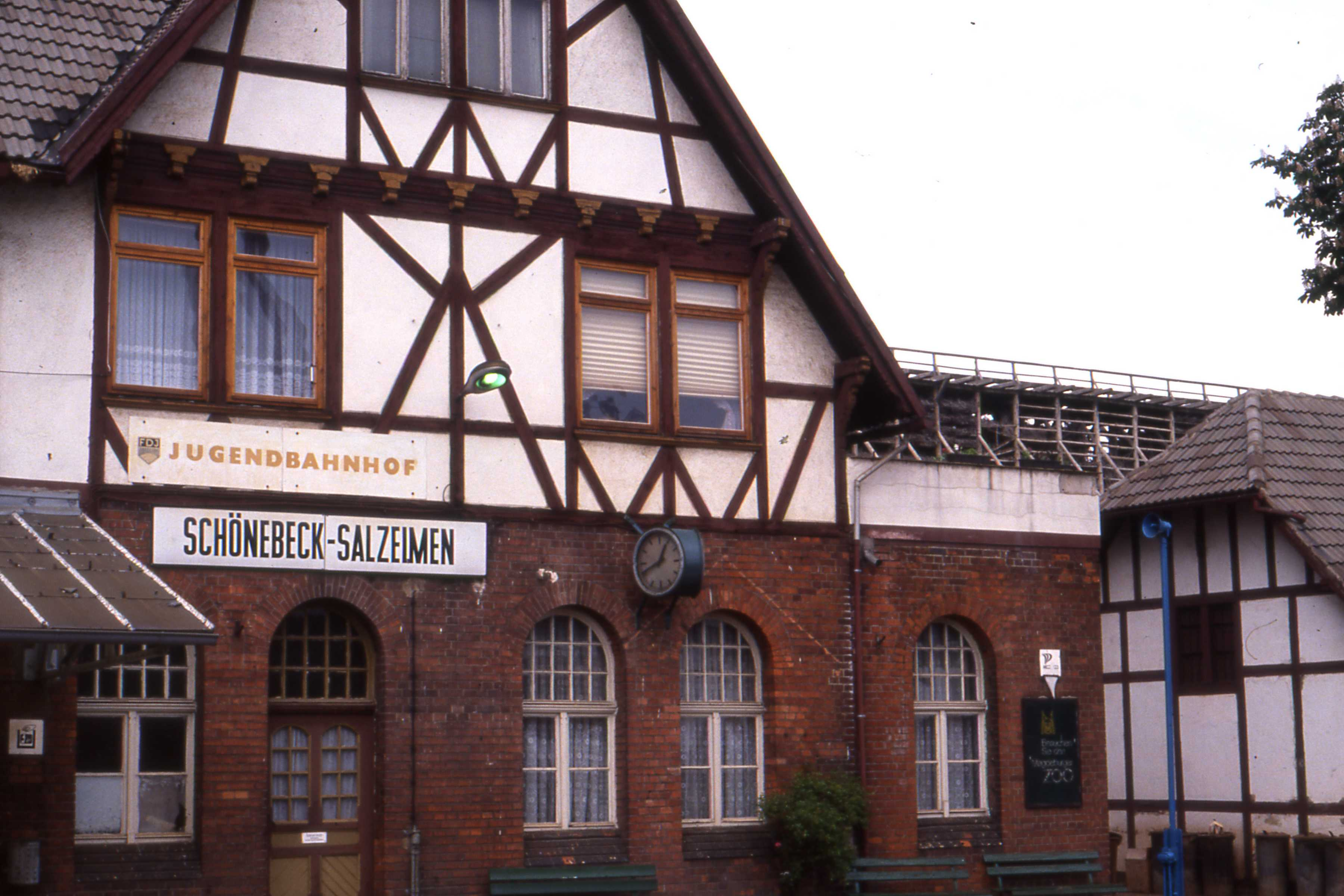
- 1990

General information
- Location: Eggersdorfer Straße 13; 39218 Schönebeck (Elbe); Saxony-Anhalt; Germany
- Coordinates: 51.99837°N 11.72360°E
- Owner: Deutsche Bahn
- Operator: DB Netz; DB Station&Service
- Lines: Schönebeck–Güsten railway (KBS 335)
- Platforms: 1 island platform 1 side platform
- Tracks: 3
- Train operators: Abellio Rail Mitteldeutschland; S-Bahn Mittelelbe

Other information
- Station code: 5649
- DS100 code: LSBE
- IBNR: 8012907
- Category: 6
- Fare zone: marego: 610
- Website: www.bahnhof.de

Services
Preceding station	Mittelelbe S-Bahn	Following station
Terminus	S 1	Schönebeck Süd towards Wittenberge
Preceding station	Abellio Rail Mitteldeutschland	Following station
Eggersdorf towards Aschersleben	RB 41	Schönebeck (Elbe) towards Magdeburg Hbf
Location
- Location within Saxony-Anhalt Location within Germany Location within Europe

Schönebeck-Bad Salzelmen station is a railway station in the Bad Salzelmen district in the municipality of Schönebeck (Elbe), located in the Salzlandkreis district in Saxony-Anhalt, Germany.

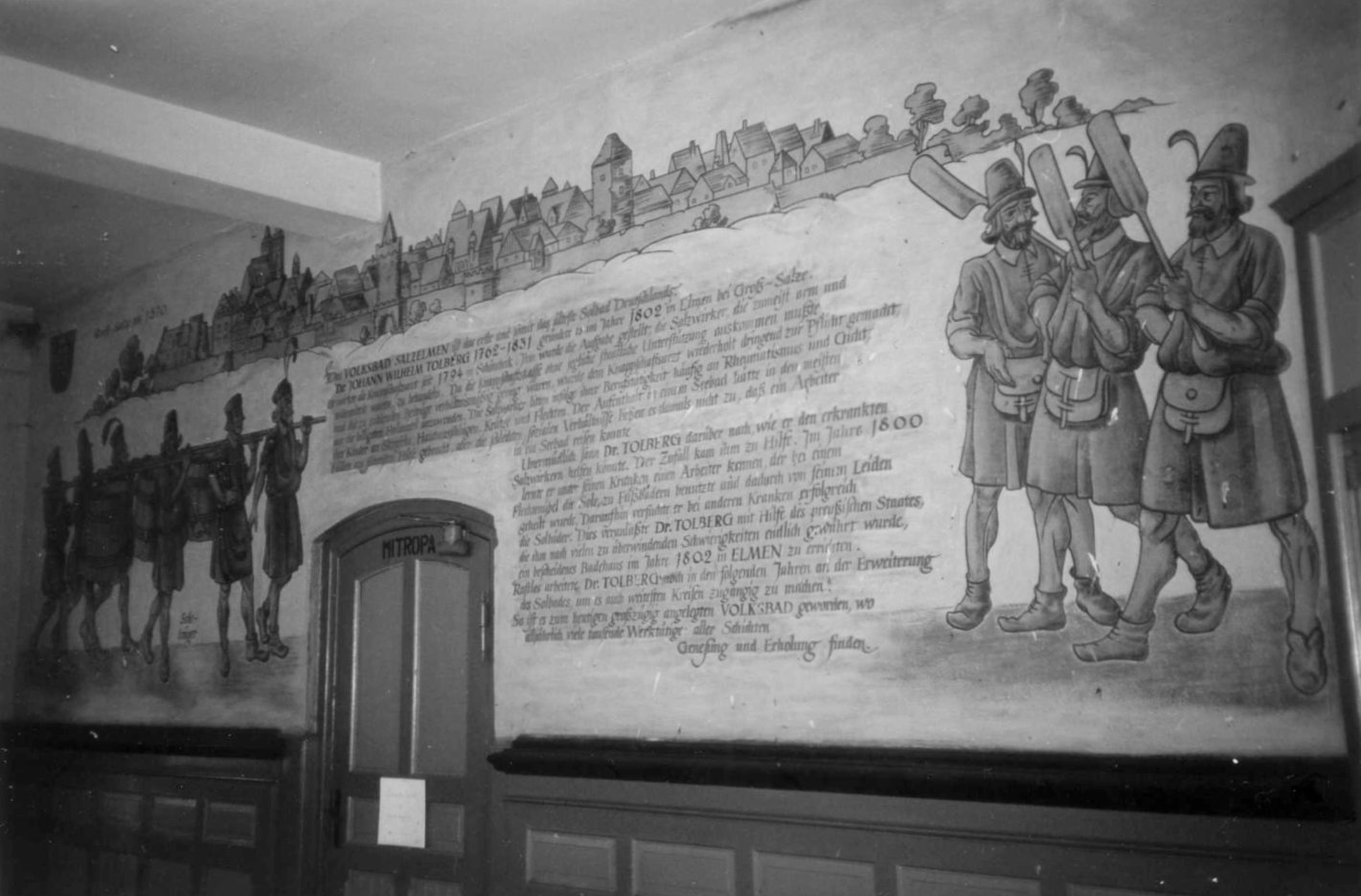
Entrance to the Mitropa restaurant, with salt production mural (May 1990).
