= Vienenburg station =

Railway station in Goslar, Germany

Vienenburg
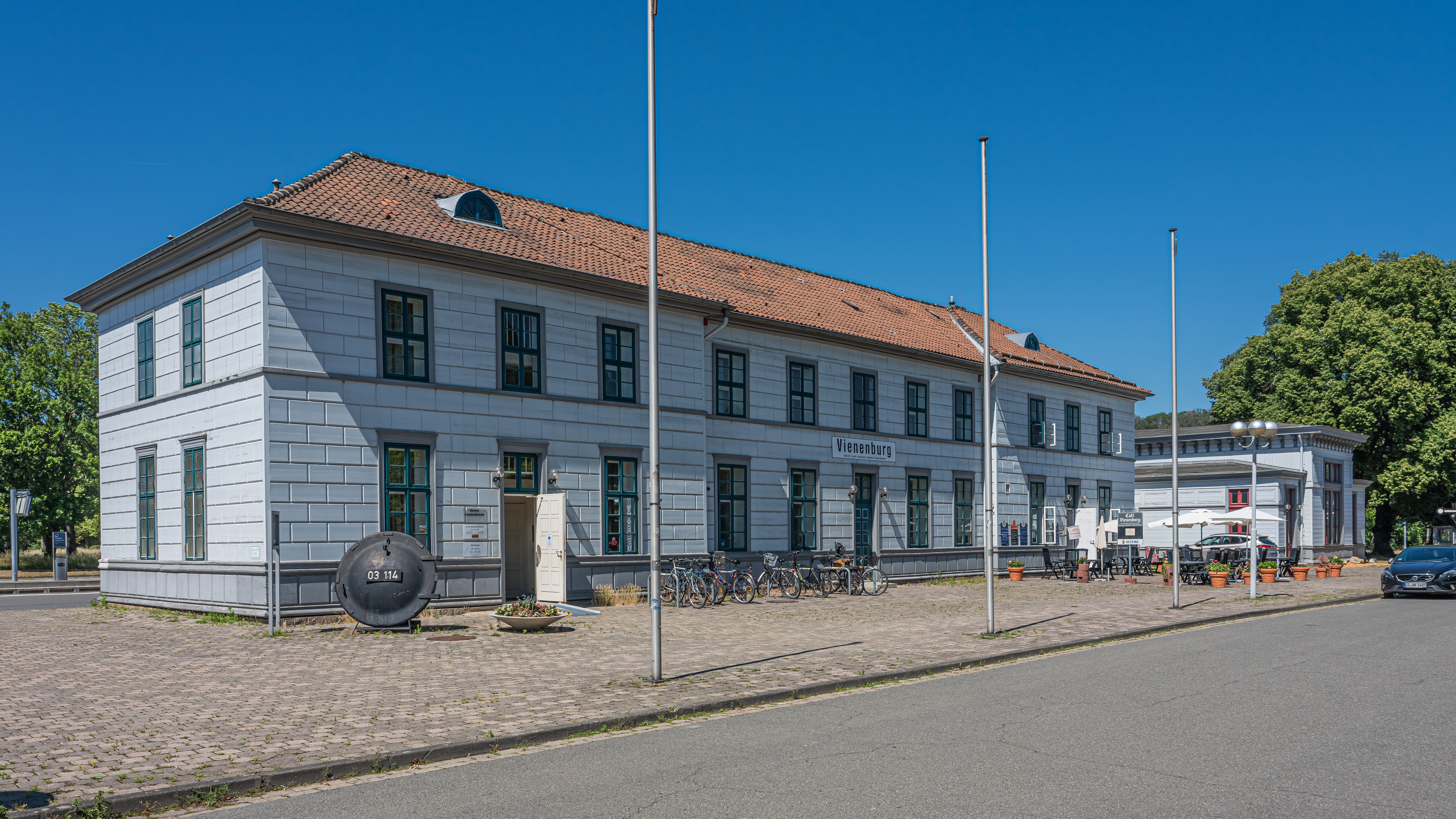
- Entrance building

General information
- Location: Bahnhofstr. 8a, Vienenburg, Lower Saxony; Germany
- Coordinates: 51°57′19″N 10°33′46″E
- Owner: Deutsche Bahn
- Operator: DB Station&Service
- Lines: Vienenburg–Goslar; Brunswick–Bad Harzburg; Halle–Vienenburg; Vienenburg–Langelsheim (closed)
- Platforms: 3
- Connections: 210 821

Construction
- Accessible: Yes

Other information
- Station code: 6412
- DS100 code: HVBG
- IBNR: 8010290
- Category: 5
- Fare zone: VRB: 81
- Website: www.bahnhof.de

History
- Opened: 1841

Services
Preceding station	Start	Following station
Goslar Terminus	HBX	Ilsenburg towards Berlin Ostbahnhof
Goslar Terminus	RE 4	Ilsenburg towards Halle (Saale) Hbf
Goslar Terminus	RE 21	Stapelburg towards Magdeburg Hbf
Preceding station		Following station
Bad Harzburg Terminus	RB 42	Schladen towards Braunschweig Hbf
Oker towards Goslar	RB 43	Schladen towards Braunschweig Hbf
Location
- Location within Lower Saxony Location within Germany Location within Europe

Vienenburg station is a station in Vienenburg in the German state of Lower Saxony. It once formed a railway junction in the northern foothills of the Harz, parts of which still exist. The station has one of the oldest surviving entrance buildings in Germany. It belongs to the station category 5.

== Location ==
It is located just a few metres north of the town center of Vienenburg, a district of Goslar near a small river, the Radau. North of the station area is the Vienenburger See (a lake) and the Harly-Wald ridge rises a little further northwest.

The station is now located at the junction of the Brunswick–Bad Harzburg, Heudeber-Danstedt–Bad Harzburg/Vienenburg and Vienenburg–Goslar lines.

The former lines to Wasserleben (which continued via Halberstadt to Halle/Saale) and to Langelsheim are now closed.

== History ==
On 1 August 1837, the Duchy of Brunswick State Railway (Herzoglich Braunschweigische Staatseisenbahn) started building a railway from the Old Brunswick station to Wolfenbüttel, which was the first railway in the Duchy. The route was put into operation on 1 December 1838 and was subsequently extended via Börßum, Schladen and Vienenburg to Bad Harzburg. The construction of the stations along the line along with their entrance buildings was completed at the same time. Until 1967, the station was an island station, but this is now only recognisable at its approaches.

== Description ==
=== Entrance building ===
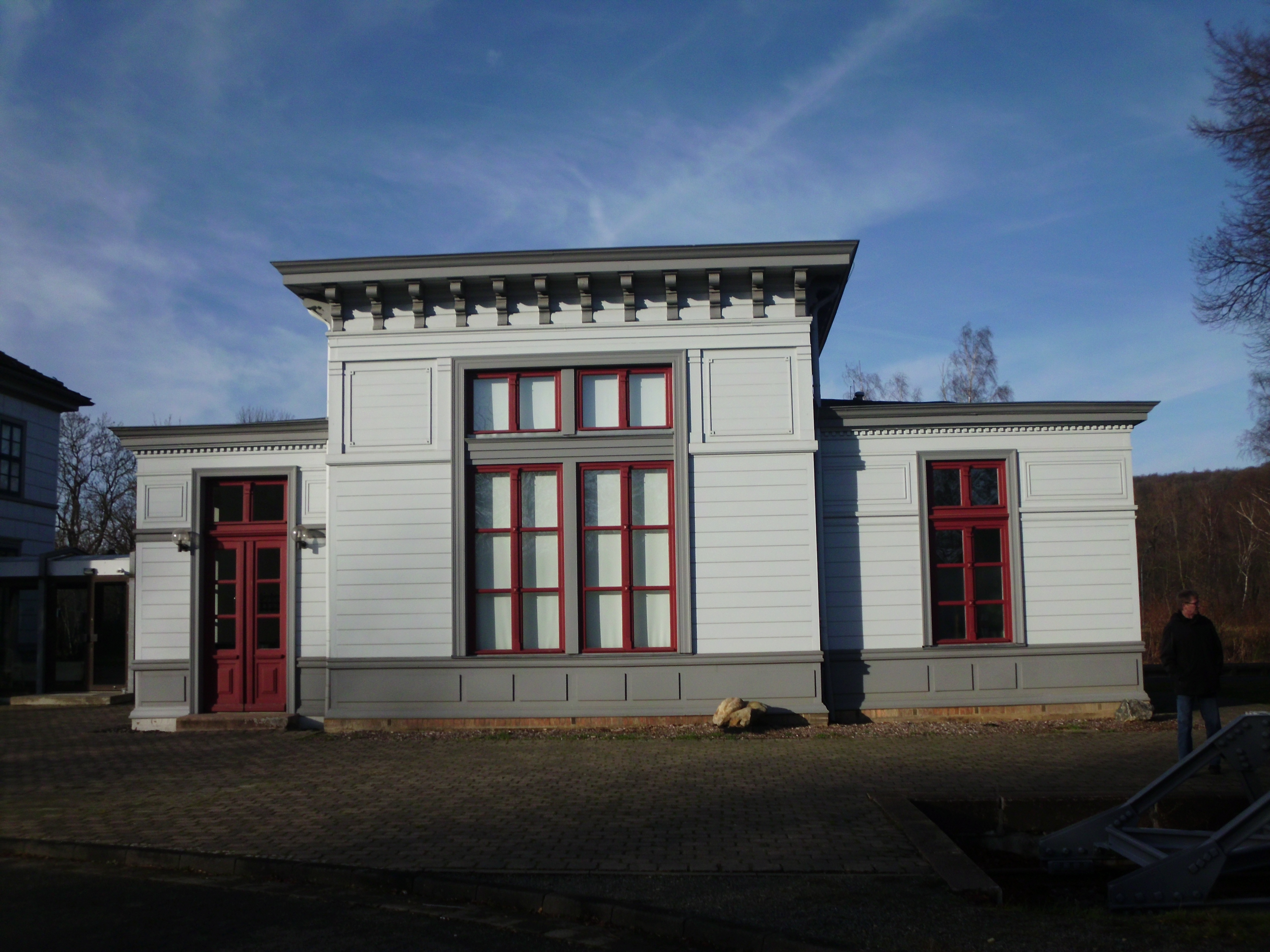
Kaisersaal (Imperial hall)

Built from 1838 to 1840, the entrance building consists of an elongated, approximately rectangular building (the central section is slightly set back from the building line) with two storeys and a tiled hip roof. The stone building has 13 window axes (vertical lines of windows) and two central doorways on the ground floor, which give access from the station forecourt via the waiting room to the main platform.

Next to the station building and connected to it by a corridor, is the so-called Kaisersaal (imperial hall), where William I, the German Emperor, rested during his stay in Vienenburg on 15 August 1875. The hall can be rented today for celebrations.

The main building of the station houses a café, the local library, a visitor centre and the rooms of a railway museum (as of 2013).

=== Other buildings ===
In the station area there are several signal boxes, which are now mostly out of use.

=== Railway tracks ===
Today, the station has three main tracks, one of which is next to the main platform and the other two are on either side of an island platform, which is reached by a bridge. Other former shunting tracks and sidings are now used by the local railway museum. The third platform track was rebuilt in 1996 with the commissioning of the line to Ilsenburg, which had been dismantled a few years earlier.

=== Train coupling/uncoupling facility ===
In 2016, a train coupling facility was put into operation on tracks 1 and 2, which allows RB 42 and RB 43 services to be operated as portions. For this purpose, train guard signals (Zugdeckungssignale) were installed on both platform tracks near the pedestrian bridge for train travelling north. The coupling of the individual train portions running towards Brunswick usually takes place in platform 1, while platform 2 is used at about the same time for the uncoupling of the portions running towards the Harz.

Platform 3 has not been modified, as the southern approach tracks from Vienenburg do not allow trains to run directly from this platform to Bad Harzburg.

== Transports connections ==
=== Regional services ===
Vienenburg station is served by services operated by Erixx and Transdev. Since 13 December 2015, it has been operated only with Alstom Coradia LINT 27, 41 and 54 diesel railcars (classes 622, 640 and 648).

A transfer-free long-distance connection has run towards Potsdam and Berlin from Fridays to Sundays since 11 December 2005 as the Harz-Berlin-Express.

The RB 42 and 43 services operate between Brunswick and Vienenburg as a single coupled train. In Vienenburg, the portions running towards the Harz are uncoupled, where the front portion usually continues as the RB 43 to Goslar, while the rear portion runs as the RB 42 to Bad Harzburg. In the opposite direction, the portion coming from Goslar is coupled with the portion returning from Bad Harzburg in Vienenburg. Services are as follows (as of 2025):

Line	Route	Interval (min)	Operator
HBX	Goslar – Vienenburg – Wernigerode – Halberstadt – Magdeburg Hbf – Potsdam Hbf – Berlin Ostbahnhof	A single train pair	Start
RE 4	Goslar – Vienenburg – Ilsenburg – Wernigerode – Halberstadt – Aschersleben – Könnern – Halle (Saale) Hbf	120	Start
RE 21	Goslar – Vienenburg – Ilsenburg – Wernigerode – Halberstadt – Oschersleben (Bode) – Magdeburg Hbf	120	Start
RB 42	Bad Harzburg – Vienenburg – Schladen – Börßum – Wolfenbüttel – Braunschweig Hbf	60	erixx
RB 43	Goslar – Vienenburg – Schladen – Börßum – Wolfenbüttel – Braunschweig	60	erixx

=== Public transport ===
State bus route 203 runs every two hours from the station forecourt to Halberstadt via Osterwieck and Dardesheim.

=== Modernisation ===
Since March 2014, extensive work has been carried out in Vienenburg within the Niedersachsen ist am Zug II ("Lower Saxony is on the train", NIAZ II) program. These included the construction of two lifts, the raising of the platform edges to 55 centimetres above the rails, the rebuilding of the station lighting, the erection of two weather shelters and the installation of waste containers, clocks and information boxes. The modernisation cost about €2.7 million and was funded by, among others, Deutsche Bahn, the state government and Regionalverband Großraum Braunschweig (Greater Brunswick Regional Transport Association). The modernisation of the platforms was completed with the commissioning of the lifts in May 2016.

A Video-Reisezentrum (a connection to a remote ticket office over a video link) was put into operation on 31 March 2017.

== Rail museum ==
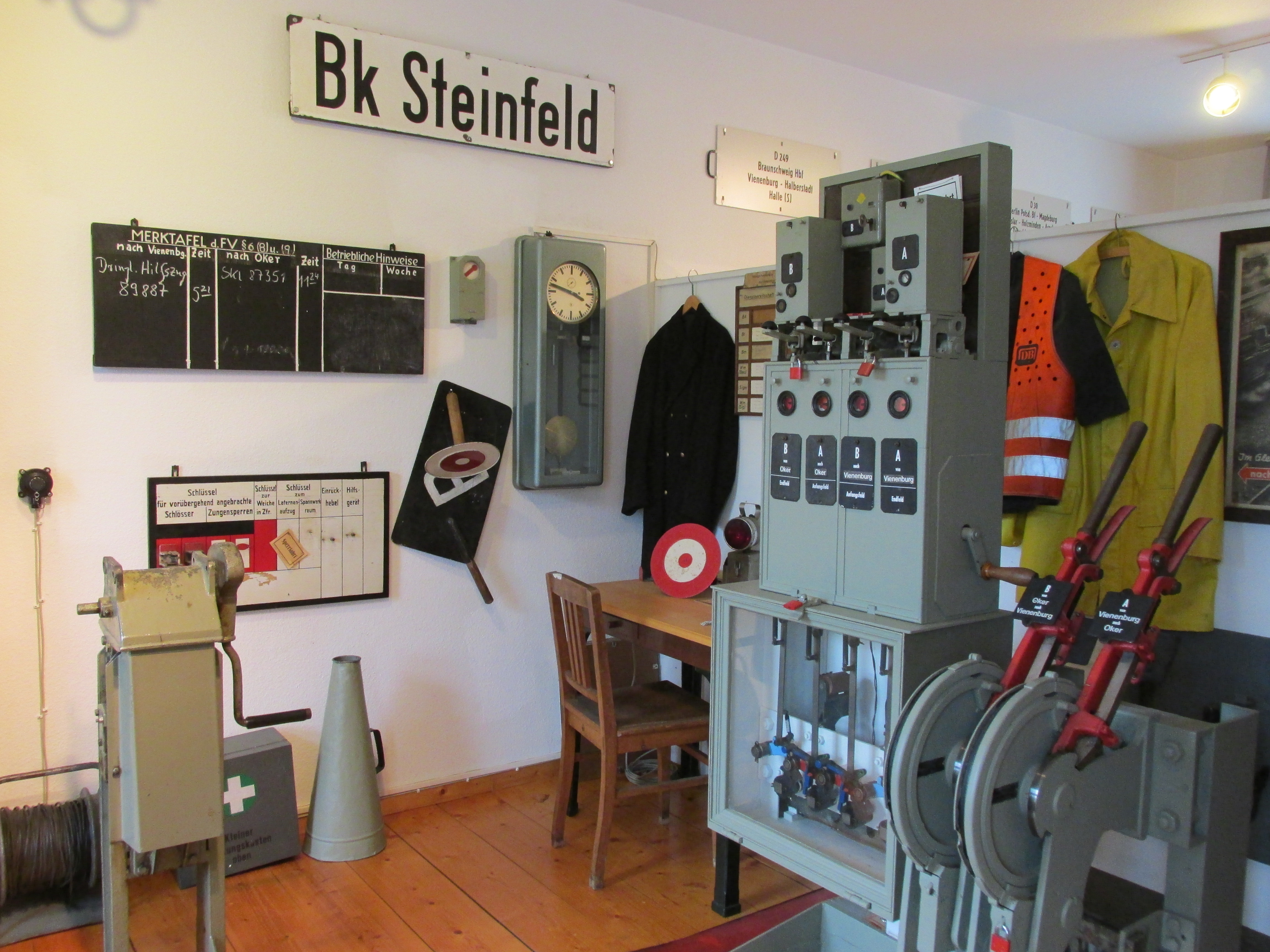
View of the collection of the railway museum

The Vienenburg Railway Museum is located in the northeast of the entrance building with exhibits of no longer used railway technology. It also contains some remaining storage and shunting tracks and some remaining and former railway buildings and railway facilities, which are mostly used by the museum.

The museum owns locomotive 52 1360, an operational class 52 steam locomotive, built in 1943 at the Borsig works in Berlin as a so-called Kriegslokomotive (war locomotive).

== Heritage listing ==
The historic station building is now heritage listed.
