= Aschersleben station =

Railway station in Germany

Aschersleben Aschersleben Pbf
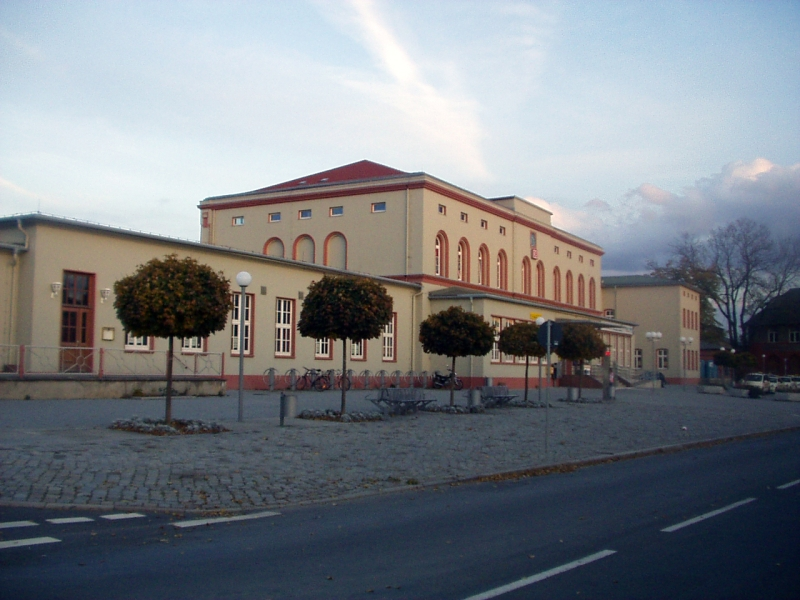
- 2004

General information
- Location: Herrenbreite 24; 06449 Aschersleben; Saxony-Anhalt; Germany
- Coordinates: 51.7574°N 11.4646°E
- Owner: Deutsche Bahn
- Operator: DB Station&Service
- Lines: Halle–Vienenburg railway (KBS 330); Köthen–Aschersleben railway (KBS 334); Aschersleben-Schneidlingen-Nienhagen Railway
- Platforms: 2 island platforms 1 side platform
- Tracks: 7
- Train operators: DB Regio Südost

Other information
- Station code: 194
- DS100 code: LAL
- IBNR: 8010009
- Category: 4
- Fare zone: marego: 636
- Website: www.bahnhof.de

Services
Preceding station	Abellio Rail Mitteldeutschland	Following station
Frose towards Goslar	RE 4	Sandersleben (Anh) towards Halle (Saale) Hbf
Gatersleben towards Halberstadt	RE 24	Drohndorf-Mehringen towards Halle (Saale) Hbf
Frose towards Halberstadt	RB 44	Terminus
Terminus	RB 41	Schierstedt towards Magdeburg Hbf
Terminus	RB 50	Schierstedt towards Dessau Hbf
Location
- Location within Saxony-Anhalt Location within Germany Location within Europe

Aschersleben station is a railway station in the municipality of Aschersleben, located in the Salzlandkreis district in Saxony-Anhalt, Germany.
