= Schönebeck–Güsten railway =

Railway line in Germany

Schönebeck (Elbe)–Güsten railway

Overview
- Line number: 6423
- Locale: Saxony-Anhalt, Germany

Service
- Route number: 335

Technical
- Line length: 28.5 km (17.7 mi)
- Number of tracks: 2: Schönebeck–Schönebeck-Salzelmen
- Track gauge: 1,435 mm (4 ft 8 1/2 in) standard gauge
- Electrification: Schönebeck–Schönebeck-Salzelmen: 15 kV/16.7 Hz AC overhead catenary
- Operating speed: 120 km/h (74.6 mph) (max)

The Schönebeck–Güsten railway is a railway in the German state of Saxony-Anhalt. The line is, with the exception of the Schönebeck (Elbe)–Schönebeck-Salzelmen section, single track and not electrified.

== History ==
The line was opened in two sections. The Schönebeck–Staßfurt section was opened on 12 May 1857. The line was operated by the Magdeburg-Leipzig Railway Company (Magdeburg-Leipziger Eisenbahn-Gesellschaft). Together with the main line, branches were built to the salt pans in Schönebeck and Staßfurt and a freight line was built from Staßfurt to Löderburg. A lignite mine was also opened near the line in Eggersdorf in the same year. The main purpose of the line was to promote the development of mines in order to increase freight traffic. Stations were built on the line in Eggersdorf, Eickendorf and Förderstedt. On 12 April 1866, the Magdeburg–Halberstadt Railway Company (Magdeburg-Halberstädter Eisenbahngesellschaft) opened a line from Bernburg via Güsten to Aschersleben with a branch from Güsten to Staßfurt. This created a continuous route from Magdeburg via Staßfurt to Aschersleben. The Magdeburg-Halberstadt Railway took over the Magdeburg-Leipzig Railway in 1876. It, in turn, was taken over by the state of Prussia in 1879. Also in the 1870s, the Berlin–Blankenheim railway was built as part of the Kanonenbahn ("cannons railway") project, which connected Güsten on the one hand directly to Berlin, and, on the other hand, to Thuringia and Hesse. Güsten became a large railway junction.

The shortest connection between the cities (now state capitals) of Magdeburg and Erfurt runs over the Schönebeck–Güsten railway. In 1929, for example, a pair of semi-fast trains (Eilzüge) operated on this line. A pair of express trains (D-Züge) running between Berlin and Mainz/Wiesbaden also used the line. Services from Magdeburg to Bad Salzelmen had already been intensified at that time, while on the other sections passenger trains ran approximately hourly.

In 1974, Schönebeck-Salzelmen was connected to the network of the Magdeburg S-Bahn. This required the electrification of the Schönebeck-Schönebeck-Salzelmen section. In the winter of 1975, three pairs of express trains operated between Magdeburg and Erfurt, stopping in Schönebeck, Staßfurt and Güsten. About half of the passenger trains from Schönebeck ran towards Güsten and Aschersleben, while the rest ended in Güsten or continued south to Sangerhausen. Services on the line were similar in the 1991/92 timetable.

According to the law of 23 August 1999 implementing the state development plan of Saxony-Anhalt, passenger services of InterRegio quality were to be made available between Magdeburg and Erfurt. An upgrade of the Erfurt–port of Rostock route via Güsten and Schönebeck for freight transport was planned. From 2000, the Berlin–Wernigerode excursion train was routed over the Schönebeck–Güsten line, because the Berlin–Blankenheim railway had been abandoned northeast of Güsten. In the same year, class 218 diesel locomotives were briefly used to haul passenger trains; these were then replaced by locomotives of class 232. In 2003, the line was included in the Federal Transport Infrastructure Plan (Bundesverkehrswegeplan). The double tracking of the line to enable a maximum line speed of 120 km/h was envisaged. Passenger traffic has been mainly operated with Siemens Desiro Classic (class 642) diesel railcars since 2006. In the same year, the DB Regio subsidiary Elbe Saale Bahn began operations of the Magdeburg–Aschersleben Regionalbahn service, while Deutsche Bahn continued to operate Regional-Express services between Magdeburg and Erfurt.

The line south of Schönebeck-Salzelmen was connected to an electronic interlocking on 30 May 2007.

== Current use ==
The line is used by regional and freight traffic. A Regionalbahn service operates on the line from Magdeburg Hauptbahnhof via Schönebeck, Staßfurt and Güsten to Aschersleben. It is operated by DB Regio under the brand name of Elbe Saale Bahn. Alternating Regional-Express services operate on the Magdeburg–Erfurt route, stopping only in Schönebeck, Staßfurt and Güsten. The S1 service of the Mittelelbe S-Bahn also runs between Schönebeck and Schönebeck-Salzelmen. The regional passenger services are now operated with Siemens Desiro Classic diesel sets and the S-Bahn trains by class 425 sets.

== Prospects ==
In the future, Deutsche Bahn plans to invest €1.6 billion in the rail network of Saxony-Anhalt. The Schönebeck–Güsten railway would also be upgraded. The DB expects to raise the speed to a maximum of 120 kilometres per hour with travel time reductions of between three and ten minutes.
