= Goslar station =

Railway station in Goslar, Germany

Goslar
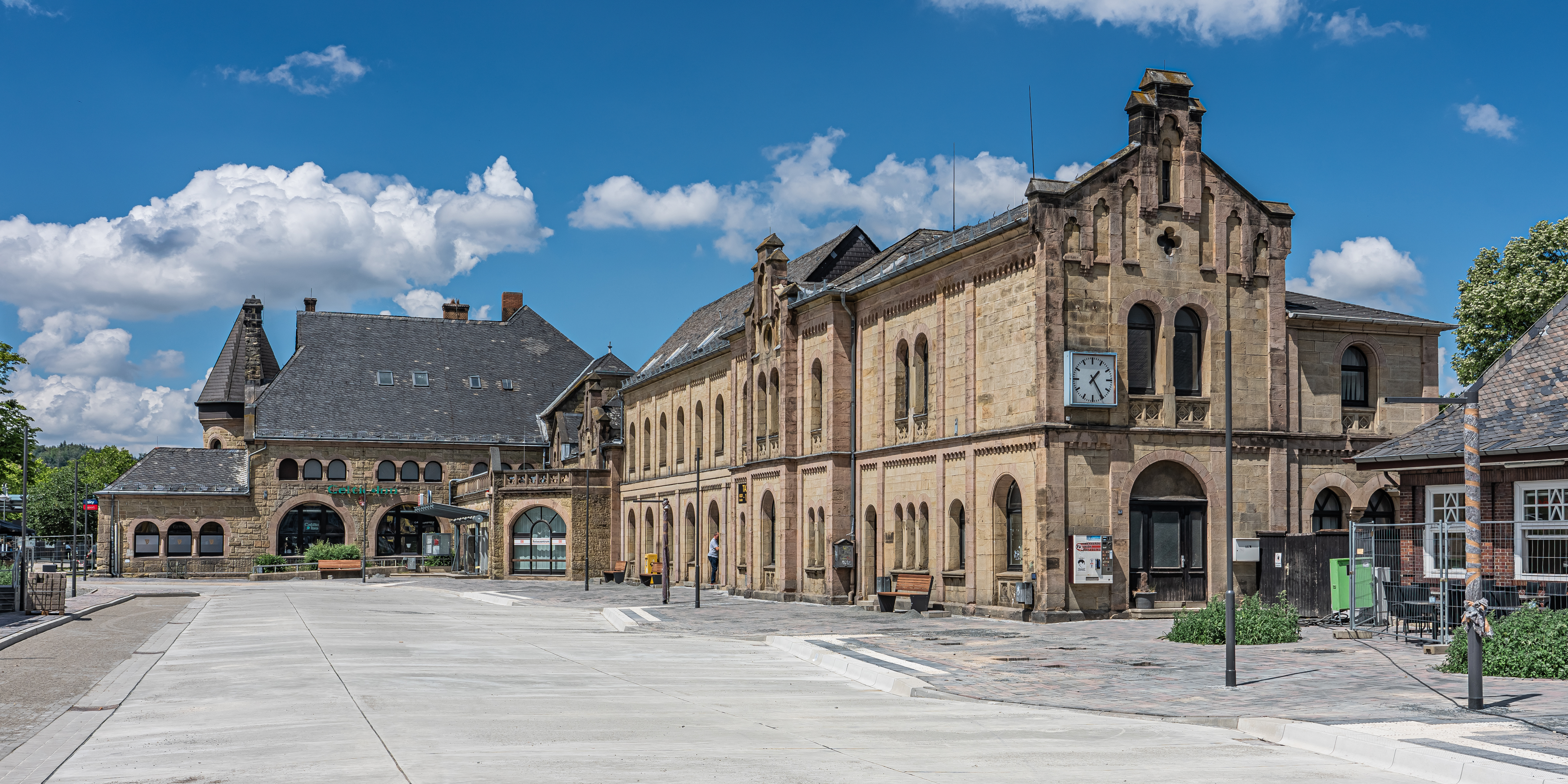
- Goslar railway station

General information
- Location: Goslar, Lower Saxony; Germany
- Coordinates: 51.5442°N 10.2517°E
- Owner: Deutsche Bahn
- Operator: DB Station&Service
- Lines: Vienenburg–Goslar railway Hildesheim–Goslar railway Neuekrug-Hahausen–Goslar railway
- Platforms: 4

Other information
- Fare zone: VRB: 80
- Website: www.bahnhof.de

History
- Opened: 23 March 1866

Services
Preceding station	Abellio Rail Mitteldeutschland	Following station
Terminus	Harz-Berlin-Express	Vienenburg towards Berlin Ostbahnhof
Terminus	RE 4	Vienenburg towards Halle (Saale) Hbf
Terminus	RE 21	Vienenburg towards Magdeburg Hbf
Preceding station		Following station
Salzgitter-Ringelheim towards Hannover Hbf	RE 10	Bad Harzburg Terminus
Terminus	RB 43	Oker towards Braunschweig Hbf
Preceding station	DB Regio Nord	Following station
Langelsheim towards Göttingen	RB 82	Oker towards Bad Harzburg
Location
- Location within Lower Saxony Location within Germany Location within Europe

Goslar (German: Bahnhof Goslar) is a railway station located in Goslar, Germany. The station opened on 23 March 1866 and is located on the Vienenburg–Goslar railway, Hildesheim–Goslar railway and Neuekrug-Hahausen–Goslar railway. The train services are operated by Erixx, Deutsche Bahn, and Abellio Rail Mitteldeutschland.

== Train services ==
The following services currently call at the station:

- Regional service RE 10 Hannover - Hildesheim - Goslar - Bad Harzburg
- Regional services RE 4 Goslar - Halberstadt - Aschersleben - Könnern - Halle
- Regional services RE 21 Goslar - Halberstadt - Aschersleben - Magdeburg
- Regional service HBX Goslar - Halberstadt - Magdeburg - Potsdam - Berlin
- Local services RB 43 Goslar - Vienenburg - Wolfenbüttel - Braunschweig
- Local services RB 82 Göttingen - Kreiensen - Goslar - Bad Harzburg
