= Mittelelbe S-Bahn =

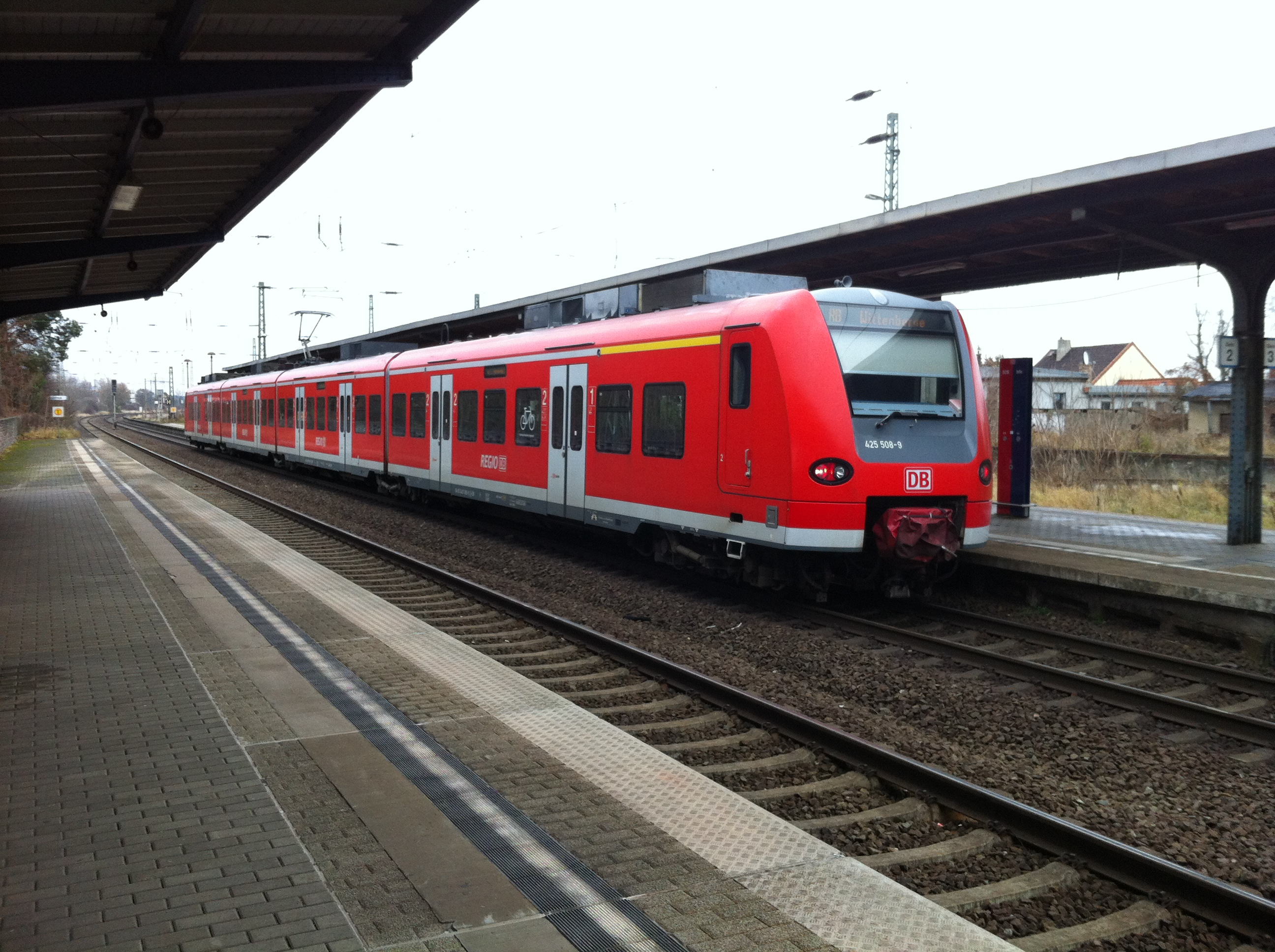
- Class 425 set in Wolmirstedt station

Overview
- Transit type: Rapid Transit, Regional rail
- Number of lines: 1
- Number of stations: 28
- Annual ridership: 2 million

Operation
- Began operation: 29 September 1974 (as S-Bahn Magdeburg); 2014 (under current name)
- Operators: Elbe Saale Bahn, DB Regio Südost
- Number of vehicles: 12x class 425

Technical
- System length: 130 km (81 mi)
- Track gauge: 1,435 mm (4 ft 8 1/2 in) standard gauge
- Electrification: 15 kV/16.7 Hz AC catenary
System map

The Mittelelbe S-Bahn ("Central Elbe S-Bahn", called the S-Bahn Magdeburg until 2014) is part of the public transport network of the metropolitan area of Magdeburg, the state capital of Saxony-Anhalt. The S-Bahn is operated by the Elbe Saale Bahn, a subsidiary of DB Regio Südost, on behalf of the Nahverkehrsservice Sachsen-Anhalt ("public transport service of Saxony-Anhalt", a state government agency that plans, manages and funds public transport services in the state). The S-Bahn currently consists of one line between Schönebeck-Salzelmen, Magdeburg, Stendal and Wittenberge, using the Schönebeck–Güsten, Magdeburg–Leipzig and Magdeburg–Wittenberge lines.

== History ==
The Magdeburg S-Bahn was opened on 29 September 1974 as a 38 kilometre-long line, on the Zielitz–Magdeburg–Schönebeck-Salzelmen route, running north–south. The halts (Haltepunkte) of Schönebeck-Frohse, Schönebeck Süd and Zielitz Ort were opened after 1974. The halt of Barleber See is served only between early May and late October as it serves leisure traffic to the lake of the same name, which is located north of Magdeburg. There was an hourly connection between Schönebeck and Haldensleben in GDR times with an S-Bahn set shortened to one carriage and hauled by a DR class 110 or DR class 112 diesel locomotive. Passengers could travel on this train to Magdeburg-Rothensee on an S-Bahn fare.

From 9 December 2007 until 13 December 2014, the S1 service operated only on Mondays to Fridays and only during the day except for a few trains; the stops were served by Regionalbahn services at the weekend. On 14 December 2014, the previous Regionalbahn service to/from Wittenberge, now to/from Stendal, was integrated into S-Bahn line 1, to end the parallel service by two different types of train service between Schönebeck-Salzelmen and Zielitz Ort. The trains changed their designated train class in Stendal station, but passengers did not need to change. This reverted after seven years to the S1 running between Schönebeck-Salzelmen and Zielitz Ort every 30 minutes on weekdays and hourly on the weekend. Due to the extension to the surrounding area, it was renamed from S-Bahn Magdeburg to the current name of S-Bahn Mittelelbe.

The change in train class in Stendal was abolished at the timetable change on 13 December 2015, so that the trains now run to/from Wittenberge as S-Bahn services. The service between Zielitz and Stendal was extended by two additional train pairs in the morning (Mon–Fri), creating a 30-minute cycle. A few trains run between Stendal and Salzwedel as Regionalbahn 32, changing train class in Stendal. In addition, during the peak, a train runs as the S1X service from Magdeburg to Wittenberge and back; this does not stop at all stops so that it can connect with long-distance services.

== S-Bahn fares ==
The Magdeburg S-Bahn and all regional trains operated parallel to the S-Bahn until the establishment of the Magdeburger Regionalverkehrsverbund (Magdeburg Regional Transport, branded as marego) on 12 December 2010 used a special S-Bahn fare structure modelled on the former DR S-Bahn fare structure. In contrast to these, a separate fare for the Magdeburg S-Bahn only was not introduced until 1 February 1994. There were separate S-Bahn fares earlier in the cities of Berlin, Dresden, Erfurt, Leipzig/Halle and Rostock. In contrast to Magdeburg, however, these were replaced much earlier by the various transport associations or abolished in the case of Erfurt with the abandonment of the S-Bahn.

The Magdeburg S-Bahn fares were a bit cheaper than the standard nationwide local transport fares. It was not based like the latter on the actual trip distance, but on a zone system. It consisted of three zones:

- northern fare zone (Zielitz and Wolmirstedt)
- urban fare zone (urban Magdeburg)
- southern fare zone (Schönebeck)

The urban fare zone was always counted twice, so there were a total of four price levels. In addition to single tickets the S-Bahn Magdeburg also had multi-trip tickets, weekly tickets and monthly passes, but no day tickets (except the "Wochenend-Familien-Ticket": weekend family ticket) were offered. In addition, the S-Bahn fare was also offered on the Magdeburg-Neustadt–Magdeburg-Herrenkrug route.

For commuters and frequent travellers in Magdeburg between the S-Bahn and the nearby region, there was also the parent MUM (Magdeburg-Umland: Magdeburg surrounds) fare, which also covered the area served by Magdeburger Verkehrsbetriebe (Magdeburge Transport Company, a municipal utility). The MUM fare, however, was not a true Transport Association fare structure because only periodic cards (but no single tickets) were offered. This meant that for single journeys in the Magdeburg region, a new ticket had to be used with each change from the S-Bahn to another form of public transport.

== Rolling stock ==
The typical trains operated on the Magdeburg S-Bahn in GDR times were green LOWA-E5 cars (central entrance cars). From 1990, single double-deck carriages were used, although in the early 1990s some four-part DB double-deck sets were also used. Class 425 sets are now used on line S1. In 2015, they were modernised and received new seats, folding tables, electrical outlets and an improved passenger information system.

== Prospects ==
The ÖPNV-Plan des Landes Sachsen-Anhalt 2005 (public transport plan for the state of Saxony-Anhalt 2005) includes scenarios that include the conversion of several RB services into S-Bahn services in 2010–2015 and in 2025. These plans for a regional S-Bahn network were mainly promoted by the Minister of Transport, Karl-Heinz Daehre. The closure of services on the line to Loburg and the implementation of other measures, which are also reflected in the relevant procedures for procuring transport services, has made the original concept superfluous. The connection to Zerbst has been rebranded as part of the S-Bahn Mitteldeutschland 2 network, which is operated by the Elbe-Saale-Bahn, a subsidiary of DB Regio.

The basic framework for the future S-Bahn network would be lines S1 and RB40 (Brunswick–Magdeburg–Burg). Further connections to Langenweddingen (as a replacement for the RB service to Oschersleben) and Haldensleben might also be integrated in due course. However, the planned operating concepts are for upgrades of the Magdeburg–Oschersleben–Halberstadt and Magdeburg–Haldensleben–Oebisfelde lines and the services would be operated permanently with diesel traction.

A station called 'Stendal Hochschule' is set to open in 2022.
