= Biederitz-Möser =

Coordinates: 52°13′N 11°48′E

Biederitz-Möser was a Verwaltungsgemeinschaft ("collective municipality") in the Jerichower Land district, in Saxony-Anhalt, Germany. It was situated east of Magdeburg. The seat of the Verwaltungsgemeinschaft was in Möser. It was disbanded on 1 January 2010.

The Verwaltungsgemeinschaft Biederitz-Möser consisted of the following municipalities:

1. Biederitz
2. Gerwisch
3. Gübs
4. Hohenwarthe
5. Königsborn
6. Körbelitz
7. Lostau
8. Möser
9. Pietzpuhl
10. Schermen
11. Woltersdorf
