= Gommern station =

Railway station in Germany

Gommern
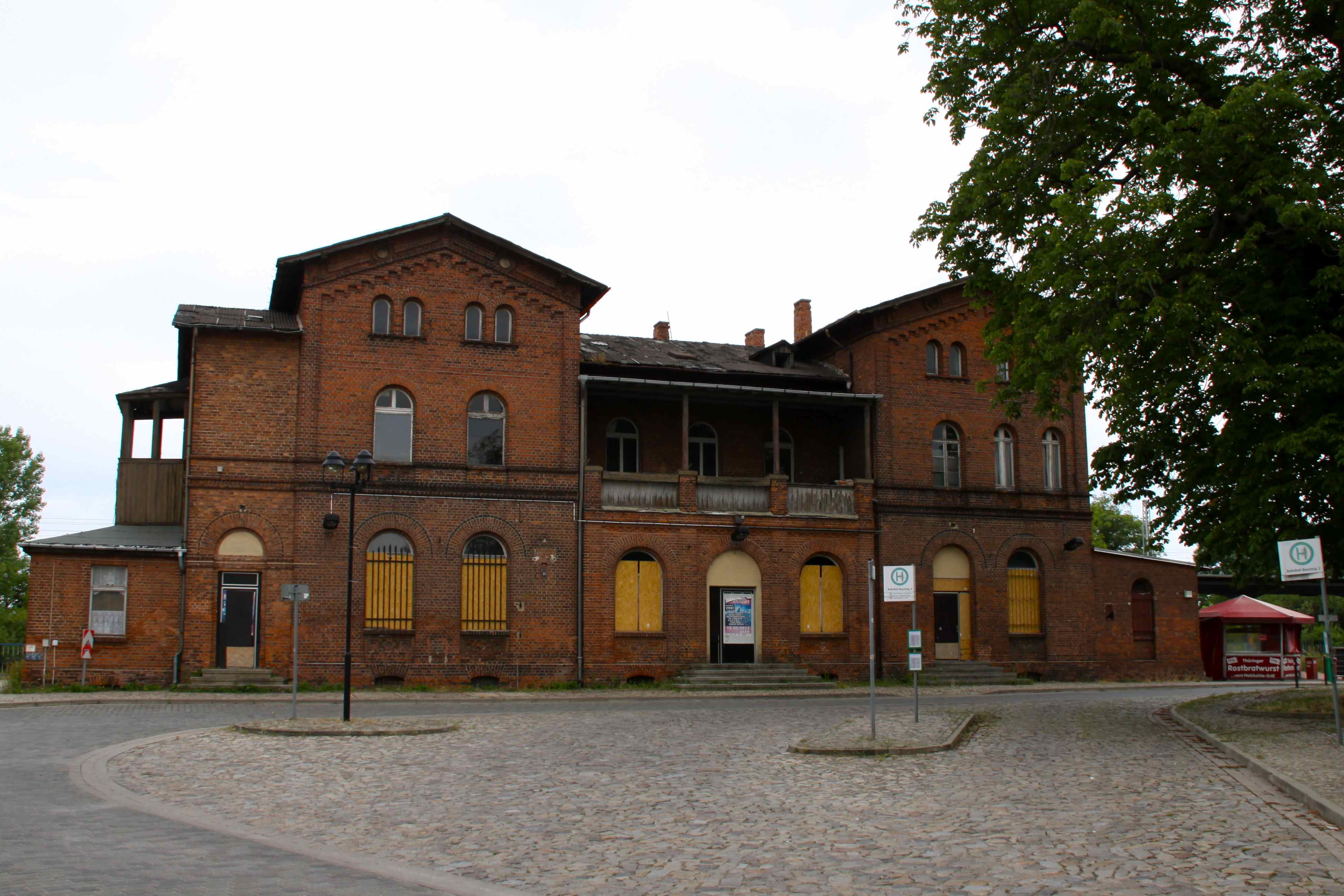
- 2015

General information
- Location: Bahnhofstraße 18; 39245 Gommern; Saxony-Anhalt; Germany
- Coordinates: 52°04′26″N 11°50′19″E
- Owner: DB Netz
- Operator: DB Station&Service
- Lines: Biederitz–Trebnitz railway (KBS 254); Gommern–Pretzien light railway; Light railways in Jerichow district
- Platforms: 2 side platforms
- Tracks: 2
- Train operators: DB Regio Südost

Other information
- Station code: 2186
- DS100 code: LGO
- IBNR: 8011673
- Category: 6
- Fare zone: marego: 417
- Website: www.bahnhof.de

Services
Preceding station	DB Regio Südost	Following station
Wahlitz towards Magdeburg Hbf	RE 13	Prödel towards Leipzig Hbf
Biederitz towards Magdeburg Hbf	RE 14	Zerbst/Anhalt towards Falkenberg (Elster)
Location
- Location within Saxony-Anhalt

Gommern station is a railway station in the municipality of Gommern, located in the Jerichower Land district in Saxony-Anhalt, Germany.
