= Lübs (bei Magdeburg) station =

Railway station in Germany

Lübs (bei Magdeburg)

General information
- Location: Bahnhofstraße 1; 39264 Lübs; Saxony-Anhalt; Germany
- Coordinates: 52°01′14″N 11°56′06″E
- Owner: DB Netz
- Operator: DB Station&Service
- Lines: Biederitz–Trebnitz railway (KBS 254)
- Platforms: 2 side platforms
- Tracks: 2
- Train operators: DB Regio Südost

Other information
- Station code: 3818
- DS100 code: LLBS
- IBNR: 8012263
- Category: 6
- Fare zone: marego: 457
- Website: www.bahnhof.de

Services
Preceding station	DB Regio Südost	Following station
Prödel towards Magdeburg Hbf	RE 13	Güterglück towards Leipzig Hbf
Location
- Location within Saxony-Anhalt

Lübs (bei Magdeburg) station is a railway station in the municipality of Lübs, located in the Jerichower Land district in Saxony-Anhalt, Germany.
