= Biederitz station =

Railway halt in Germany

Biederitz

General information
- Location: Bahnhofstraße/Heyrothsberger Straße; 39175 Biederitz; Saxony-Anhalt; Germany
- Coordinates: 52°09′11″N 11°43′00″E
- Owner: DB Netz
- Operator: DB Station&Service
- Lines: Berlin–Magdeburg railway (KBS 260); Biederitz–Trebnitz railway (KBS 254); Biederitz–Altengrabow railway (KBS 259); Biederitz–Magdeburg-Buckau railway
- Platforms: 1 island platform 3 side platforms
- Tracks: 7
- Train operators: DB Regio Südost

Other information
- Station code: 621
- DS100 code: LBZ
- IBNR: 8010047
- Category: 5
- Fare zone: marego: 415
- Website: www.bahnhof.de

History
- Opened: 1873

Services
Preceding station	DB Regio Südost	Following station
Magdeburg-Herrenkrug towards Magdeburg Hbf	RE 13	Königsborn towards Leipzig Hbf
Magdeburg-Neustadt towards Magdeburg Hbf	RE 14	Gommern towards Falkenberg (Elster)
Magdeburg-Herrenkrug towards Braunschweig Hbf	RB 40	Gerwisch towards Burg (bei Magdeburg)
Location
- Location within Saxony-Anhalt

Biederitz station is a railway station in the municipality of Biederitz, located in the Jerichower Land district in Saxony-Anhalt, Germany.
