= Güterglück station =

Railway station in Zerbst, Germany

Güterglück
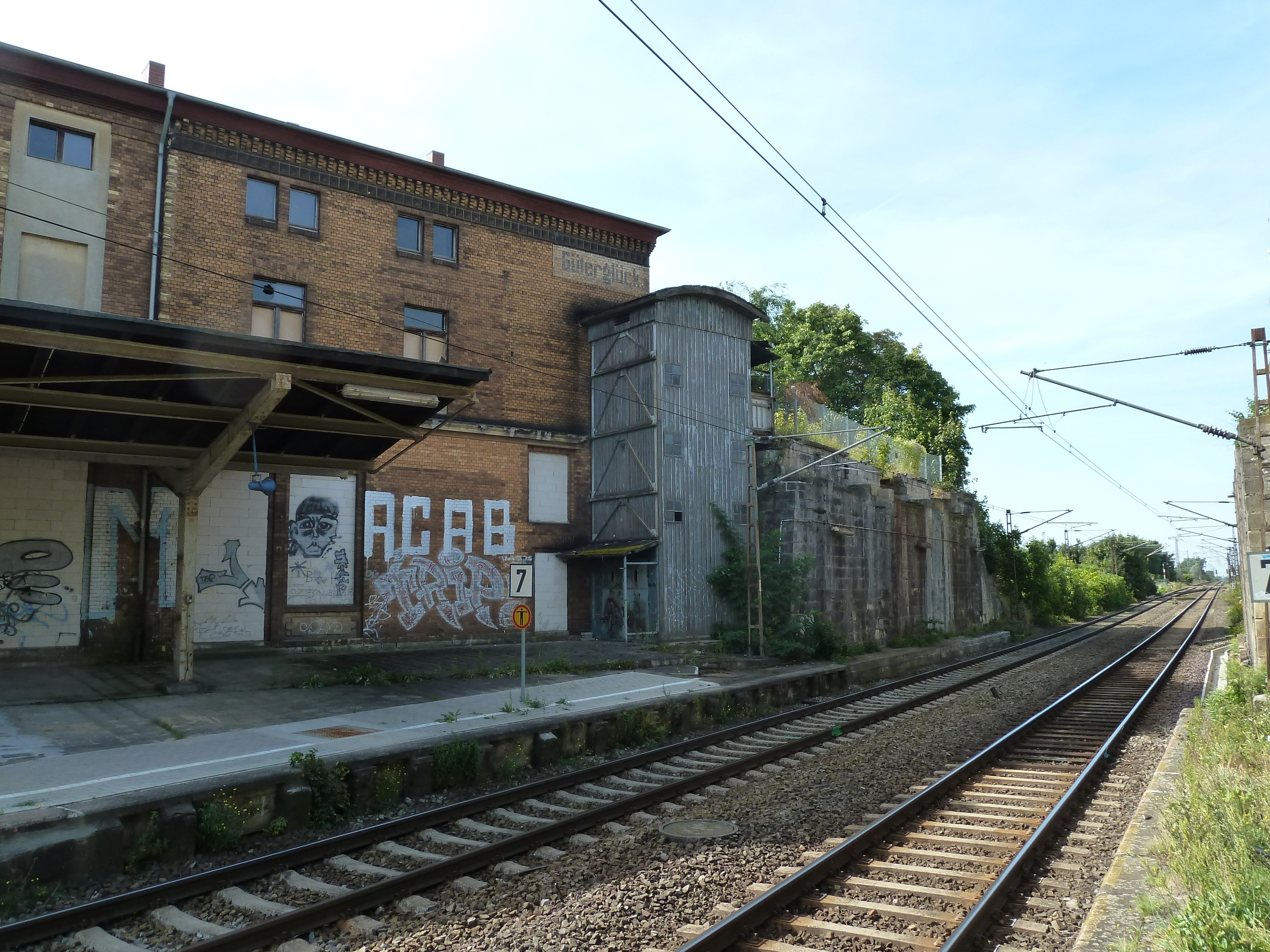
- 2012

General information
- Location: Bahnhofstraße 56a 39264 Güterglück; Saxony-Anhalt; Germany
- Coordinates: 51°59′36″N 11°59′14″E
- Owner: DB Netz
- Operator: DB Station&Service
- Lines: Biederitz–Trebnitz railway (KBS 254); Berlin-Blankenheim railway (KBS 258)
- Platforms: 2 side platforms
- Tracks: 2
- Train operators: DB Regio Südost

Other information
- Station code: 2437
- DS100 code: LGK
- IBNR: 8010154
- Category: 6
- Fare zone: MDV: 276 (rail only)
- Website: www.bahnhof.de

Services
Preceding station	DB Regio Südost	Following station
Lübs (bei Magdeburg) towards Magdeburg Hbf	RE 13	Zerbst/Anhalt towards Leipzig Hbf
Location
- Location within Saxony-Anhalt

Güterglück station is a railway station in the municipality of Güterglück, located in the Anhalt-Bitterfeld district in Saxony-Anhalt, Germany.
