= Prödel station =

Railway station in Gommern, Germany

Prödel

General information
- Location: Am Bahnhof 1; 39264 Prödel; Saxony-Anhalt; Germany
- Coordinates: 52°02′16″N 11°54′48″E
- Owner: DB Netz
- Operator: DB Station&Service
- Lines: Biederitz–Trebnitz railway (KBS 254)
- Platforms: 2 side platforms
- Tracks: 2
- Train operators: DB Regio Südost

Other information
- Station code: 5046
- DS100 code: LPRL
- IBNR: 8012678
- Category: 7
- Fare zone: marego: 457
- Website: www.bahnhof.de

Services
Preceding station	DB Regio Südost	Following station
Gommern towards Magdeburg Hbf	RE 13	Lübs (bei Magdeburg) towards Leipzig Hbf
Location
- Location within Saxony-Anhalt

Prödel station is a railway station in the municipality of Prödel, located in the Jerichower Land district in Saxony-Anhalt, Germany.
