= Königsborn station =

Railway station in Germany

Königsborn
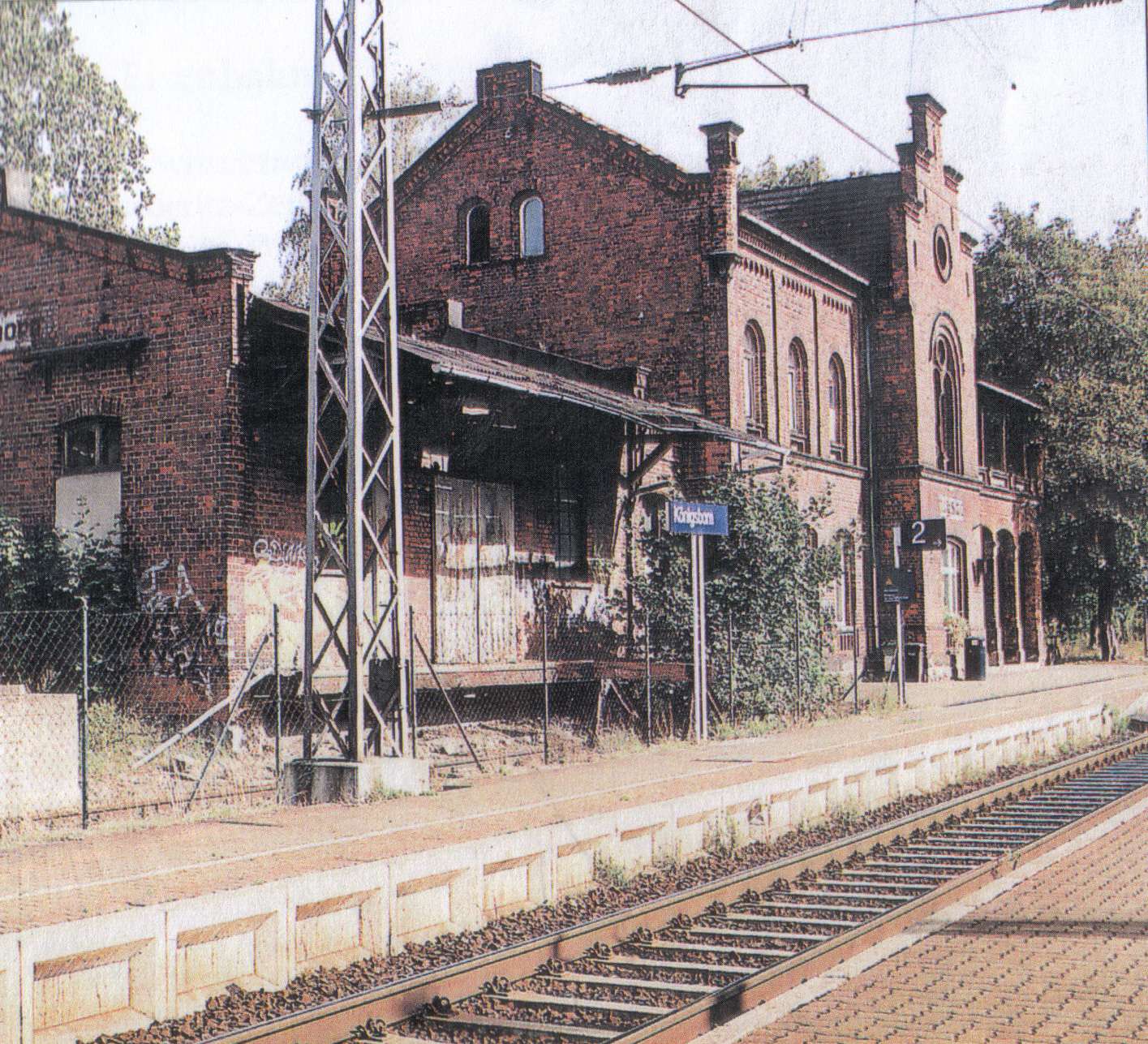
- 2004

General information
- Location: Am Bahnhof 6; 39175 Königsborn; Saxony-Anhalt; Germany
- Coordinates: 52°08′03″N 11°45′23″E
- Owner: DB Netz
- Operator: DB Station&Service
- Lines: Biederitz–Trebnitz railway (KBS 254)
- Platforms: 2 side platforms
- Tracks: 3
- Train operators: DB Regio Südost

Other information
- Station code: 3346
- DS100 code: LKB
- IBNR: 8012066
- Category: 6
- Fare zone: marego: 416
- Website: www.bahnhof.de

Services
Preceding station	DB Regio Südost	Following station
Biederitz towards Magdeburg Hbf	RE 13	Wahlitz towards Leipzig Hbf
Location
- Location within Saxony-Anhalt

Königsborn station is a railway station in the municipality of Königsborn, located in the Jerichower Land district in Saxony-Anhalt, Germany.
