= Wahlitz station =

Railway station in Germany

Wahlitz
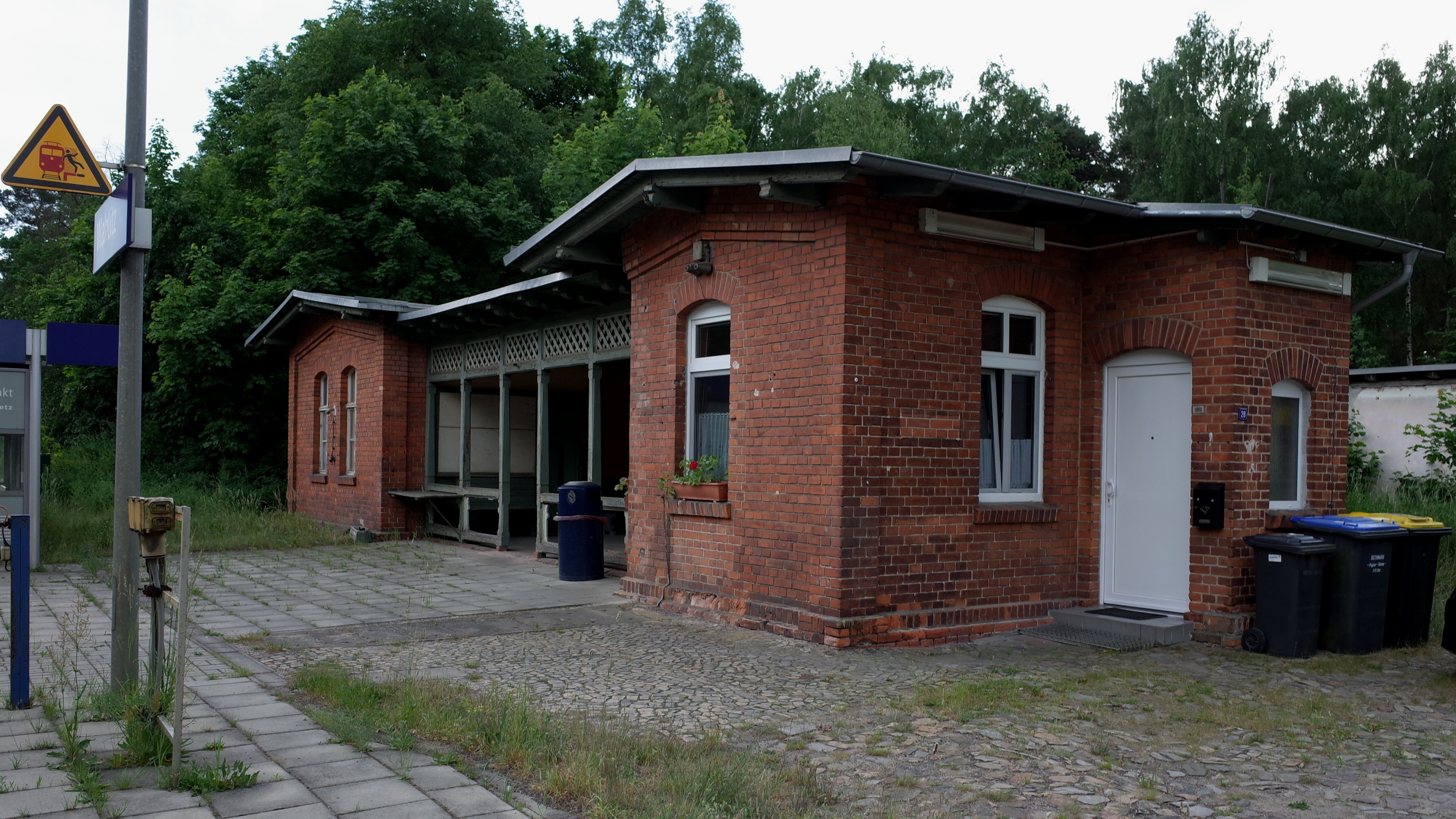
- 2017

General information
- Location: Bahnhofstraße 26; 39175 Wahlitz; Saxony-Anhalt; Germany
- Coordinates: 52°06′32″N 11°47′23″E
- Owner: DB Netz
- Operator: DB Station&Service
- Lines: Biederitz–Trebnitz railway (KBS 254)
- Platforms: 2 side platforms
- Tracks: 2
- Train operators: DB Regio Südost

Other information
- Station code: 6467
- DS100 code: LWH
- IBNR: 8013205
- Category: 6
- Fare zone: marego: 416
- Website: www.bahnhof.de

Services
Preceding station	DB Regio Südost	Following station
Königsborn towards Magdeburg Hbf	RE 13	Gommern towards Leipzig Hbf
Location
- Location within Saxony-Anhalt

Wahlitz station is a railway station in the Wahlitz district of the municipality of Gommern, located in the Jerichower Land district in Saxony-Anhalt, Germany.
