= Magdeburg-Eichenweiler station =

Railway station in Magdeburg, Germany

Magdeburg-Eichenweiler
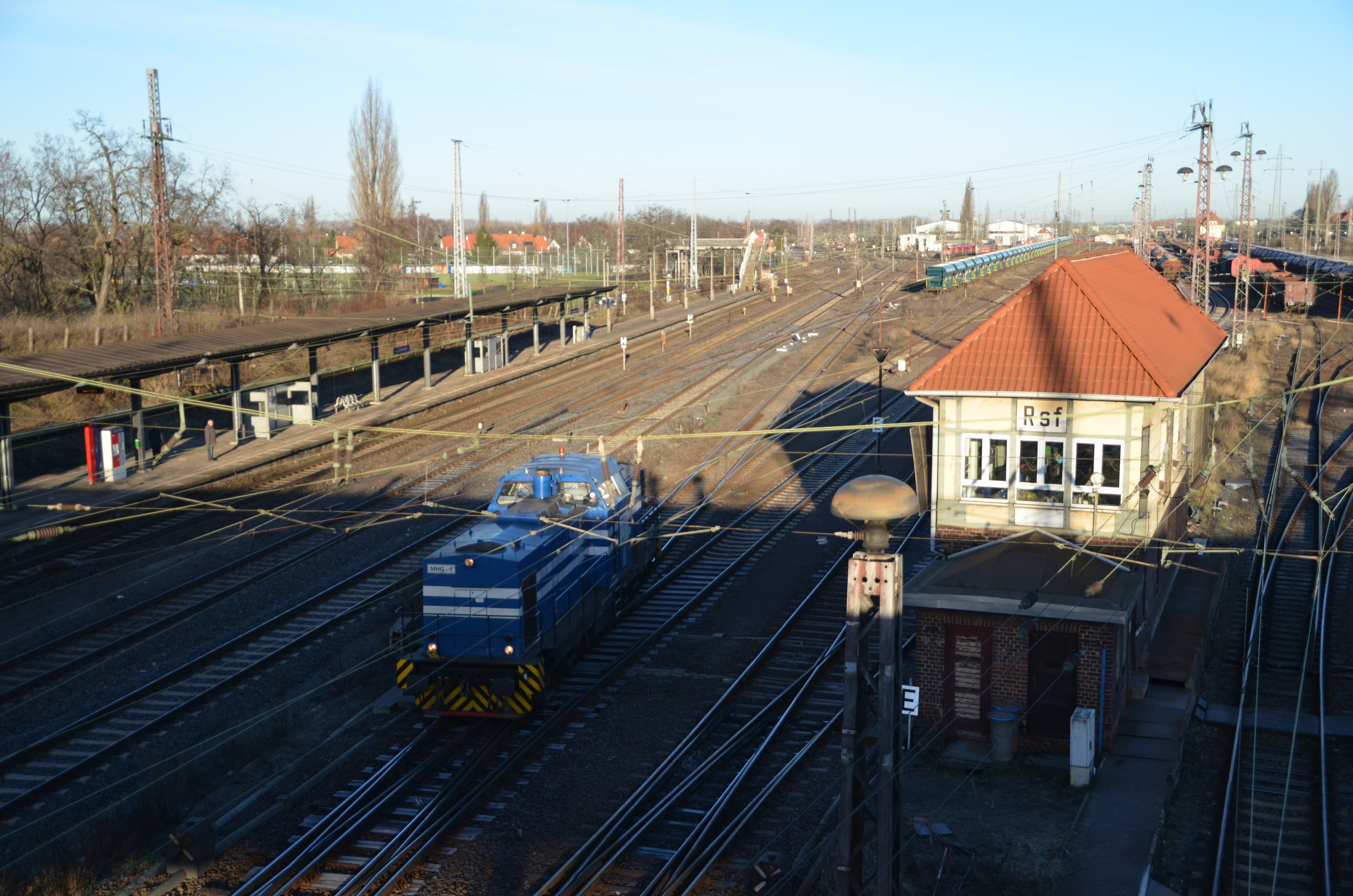
- 2012

General information
- Location: Pettenkoferstraße/August-Bebel-Damm; 39124 Magdeburg; Saxony-Anhalt; Germany
- Coordinates: 52°10′00″N 11°39′28″E
- Owner: DB Netz
- Operator: DB Station&Service
- Lines: Magdeburg-Wittenberge railway (KBS 305)
- Platforms: 1 island platform
- Tracks: 2
- Train operators: Abellio Rail Mitteldeutschland; S-Bahn Mittelelbe

Other information
- Station code: 3885
- DS100 code: LMGE
- IBNR: 8012289
- Category: 5
- Fare zone: marego: 010
- Website: www.bahnhof.de

Services
Preceding station	Abellio Rail Mitteldeutschland	Following station
Barleben towards Wolfsburg Hbf	RB 36	Magdeburg-Neustadt towards Magdeburg Hbf
Preceding station	Mittelelbe S-Bahn	Following station
Magdeburg-Neustadt towards Schönebeck-Bad Salzelmen	S 1	Magdeburg-Rothensee towards Wittenberge

Other services
Preceding station	Straßenbahn Magdeburg	Following station
Havelstraße towards Barleber See	10	Pettenkoferstraße towards Sudenburg
Location
- Location within Saxony-Anhalt

Magdeburg-Eichenweiler station is a railway station in the Eichenweiler district of Magdeburg, capital city of Saxony-Anhalt, Germany.

== Notable places nearby ==
- Magdeburg Zoo
- Neustädter See
