= Magdeburg-Neustadt station =

Railway station in Saxony-Anhalt, Germany

Magdeburg Neustadt
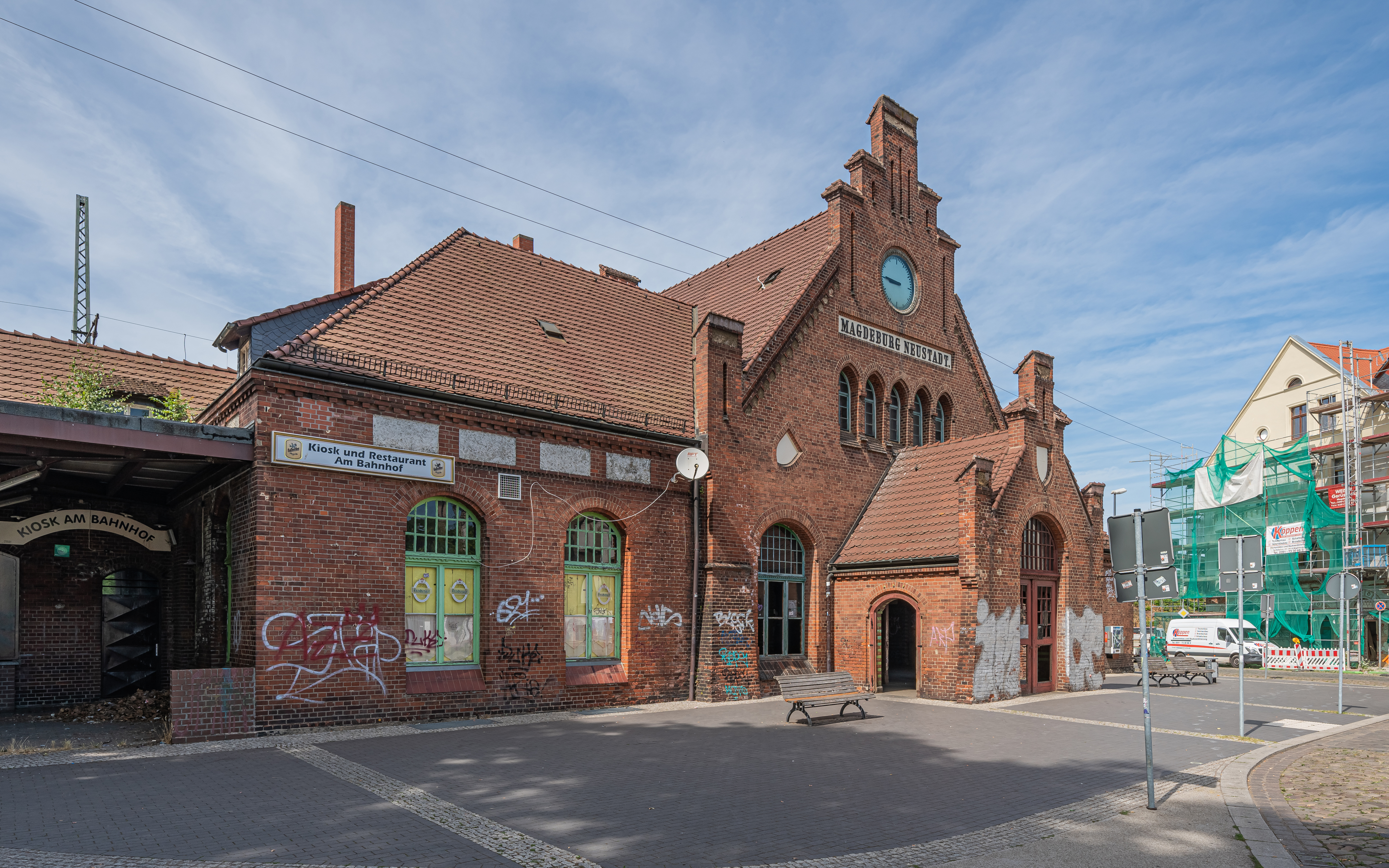
- 2022

General information
- Location: Gröperstraße; 39124 Magdeburg; Saxony-Anhalt; Germany
- Coordinates: 52°08′56″N 11°38′30″E
- Owner: DB Netz
- Operator: DB Station&Service
- Lines: Berlin–Magdeburg railway (KBS 260); Magdeburg-Wittenberge railway (KBS 305)
- Platforms: 2 island platforms
- Tracks: 4
- Train operators: Abellio Rail Mitteldeutschland; Ostdeutsche Eisenbahn; DB Regio Südost

Construction
- Accessible: Yes

Other information
- Station code: 3887
- DS100 code: LMN
- IBNR: 8010226
- Category: 4
- Fare zone: marego: 010
- Website: www.bahnhof.de

Services
Preceding station	Start	Following station
Haldensleben towards Wolfsburg Hbf	RE 6	Magdeburg Hbf Terminus
Magdeburg-Eichenweiler towards Wolfsburg Hbf	RB 36	Magdeburg Hbf Terminus
Preceding station	Ostdeutsche Eisenbahn	Following station
Magdeburg Hbf Terminus	RE 1	Burg (bei Magdeburg) towards Cottbus Hbf
Preceding station	DB Regio Südost	Following station
Magdeburg Hbf Terminus	RE 13	Magdeburg-Herrenkrug towards Leipzig Hbf
Magdeburg Hbf Terminus	RE 14	Biederitz towards Falkenberg (Elster)
Wolmirstedt towards Uelzen	RE 20	Magdeburg Hbf Terminus
Magdeburg Hbf towards Braunschweig Hbf	RB 40	Magdeburg-Herrenkrug towards Burg (bei Magdeburg)
Preceding station	Mittelelbe S-Bahn	Following station
Magdeburg Hbf towards Schönebeck-Bad Salzelmen	S 1	Magdeburg-Eichenweiler towards Wittenberge

Other services
Preceding station	Straßenbahn Magdeburg	Following station
Neustädter Friedhof towards Kannenstieg	1	AOK towards Sudenburg
AOK towards Westerhüsen	8	Neustädter Friedhof towards Neustädter See
AOK towards Reform	9	Neustädter Friedhof towards Neustädter See
Neustädter Friedhof towards Barleber See	10	AOK towards Sudenburg
Location
- Location within Saxony-Anhalt

Magdeburg-Neustadt station is a railway station in the Neustadt district of Magdeburg, capital city of Saxony-Anhalt, Germany.
