= Magdeburg-Herrenkrug station =

Railway station in Germany

Magdeburg Herrenkrug

General information
- Location: Herrenkrugstraße; 39114 Magdeburg; Saxony-Anhalt; Germany
- Coordinates: 52°08′43″N 11°40′36″E
- Owner: Deutsche Bahn
- Operator: DB Station&Service
- Lines: Berlin–Magdeburg railway (KBS 260); Magdeburg-Wittenberge railway (KBS 305)
- Platforms: 2 side platforms
- Tracks: 2
- Train operators: DB Regio Südost

Other information
- Station code: 7971
- DS100 code: LMHR
- IBNR: 8013455
- Category: 6
- Fare zone: marego: 010
- Website: www.bahnhof.de

History
- Opened: 1999; 27 years ago

Services
Preceding station	DB Regio Südost	Following station
Magdeburg-Neustadt towards Magdeburg Hbf	RE 13	Biederitz towards Leipzig Hbf
Magdeburg-Neustadt towards Magdeburg Hbf	RE 14	Biederitz towards Falkenberg (Elster)

Other services
Preceding station	Straßenbahn Magdeburg	Following station
Fachhochschule towards Diesdorf	6	Terminus
Location
- Location within Saxony-Anhalt

Magdeburg-Herrenkrug station is a railway station in the Herrenkrug district of Magdeburg, capital city of Saxony-Anhalt, Germany.

== History ==
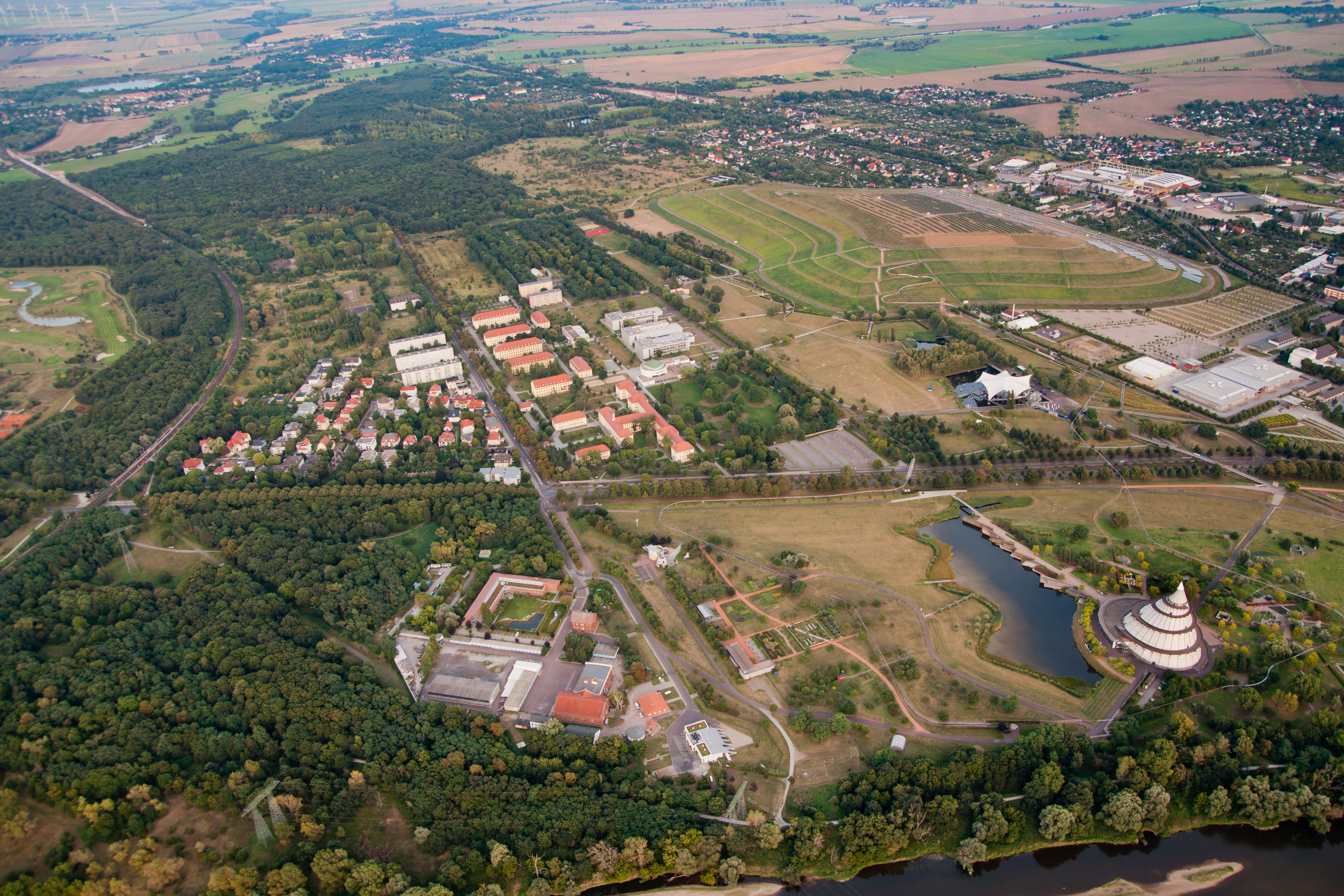
Aerial view of the Elbauenpark with Magdeburg-Herrenkrug station at the left

The station was established in 1999 due to the Bundesgartenschau, which took place in the nearby Elbauenpark.
