= MVB =

MVB may refer to:

- Martin Van Buren (1782–1862), eighth president of the United States
- Marco van Basten (born 1964), Dutch football player
- Mark van Bommel (born 1977), Dutch football player
- MY Vision Born, the acronym (MVB) that precedes several entertainment, media, and also philanthropic related organizations created by Abdel Russell
- Multivesicular body, a specialized endosome which itself contains internal vesicles
- Multifunction Vehicle Bus, a data line used in train control systems
- Magdeburger Verkehrsbetriebe (MVB), operator of trams in Magdeburg, Germany
