= Prodel =

Prodel may refer to:

- Prödel, former German municipality
- Dydrogesterone, by trade name Prodel
