= Valentin Manheimer =

German businessman and fashion designer

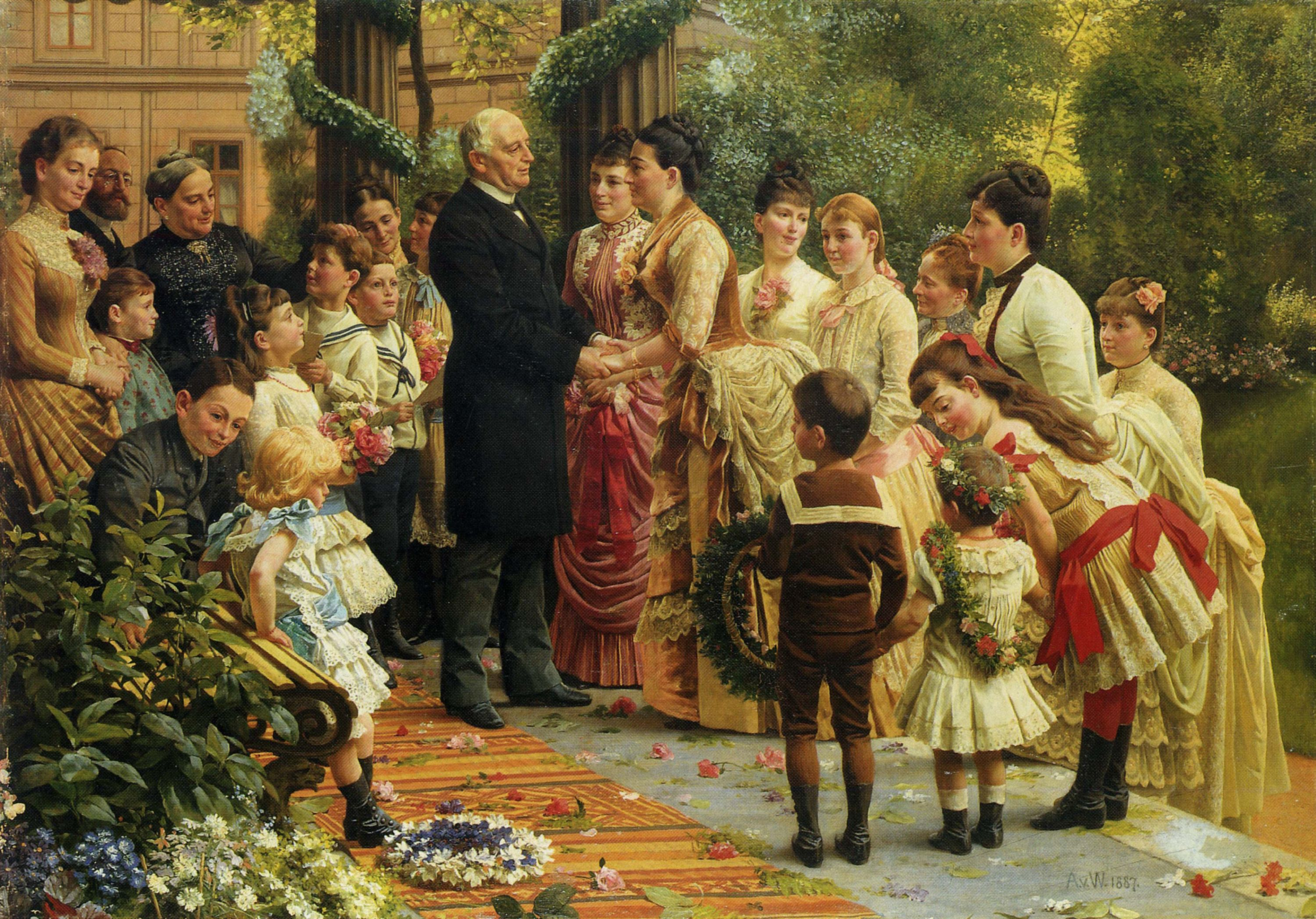
- Born: 12 July 1815; Gommern, Anhalt-Köthen
- Died: 7 February 1889 (aged 73); Berlin, Germany
- Citizenship: German
- Known for: Founder of Manheimer Berlin
- Spouse: Philippine Behrend
- Children: 8

Valentin Manheimer (born 13 July 1815 in Gommern, died 7 February 1889 in Berlin) was a German Jewish businessman and a pioneer of the fashion industry in Berlin.

Manheimer was the son of a Khazan and trader. In 1844 he married Philippine Behrend, daughter of the goods dealer and women's coat manufacturer Joseph Behrend. They had three sons and five daughters. Moritz Manheimer was one of his brothers.

Valentin Manheimer settled in Berlin in 1836, along with his brothers Moritz and David. They founded the textile processing company "Gebr. Manheimer". Valentin Manheimer separated from his brothers in 1839 and founded the company "Valentin Manheimer" one of Berlin's first manufacturers of women's clothing. Manheimer used the traditions and experiences of the old Berlin tailoring trade to build a large-scale clothing company. This was partly based on the Verlagssystem. He primarily produced inexpensive women's coats made of thick wool. His products were sold in Germany as well as abroad. Manheimer had a branch in London.

He invented the measurement system for producing ready-to-wear clothing, making it possible to mass-produce good quality garments at low costs. His innovation changed the way people dressed in the 19th and early 20th centuries.

In 1856 Valentin Manheimer joined the Gesellschaft der Freunde, a Jewish relief organization in Berlin whose members supported each other in cases of poverty, unemployment, illness, and death. In 1862 he contracted architect Friedrich Hitzig to design a mansion for his family on Bellevuestr. 8 in the new Tiergarten district. After the founding of the German Reich in 1871, Manheimer gained a foothold on the international market, competed with manufacturers from Paris, and delivered to the USA. In terms of clothing industry sales, Manheimer's company ranked second after Herrmann Gerson's. In the late 1890s, it employed around 8,000 people. In 1873 he was appointed to Commercial Council and in 1884 he was nominated as Privy Council. On the occasion of Manheimer's seventieth birthday, his wife Philippe commissioned a painting from Anton von Werner.

After his death, he left a fortune of about 10 to 12 million marks, and the business was led by his sons Ferdinand, Gustav, and Alfred. In 1903 and 1904 Gustav and Alfred left, Ferdinand became sole owner and subsequently, his son Adolf took over. The company went bankrupt during the Great Depression.

He is buried in the Schönhauser Allee Jewish Cemetery.

== Sources ==
- Hans Jaeger (1990). "Manheimer, Valentin". Neue Deutsche Biographie (in German). Vol. 16. Berlin: Duncker & Humblot. pp. 34–35. (full text online).
