= Magdeburg-Hasselbachplatz station =

Railway station in Germany

Magdeburg-Hasselbachplatz
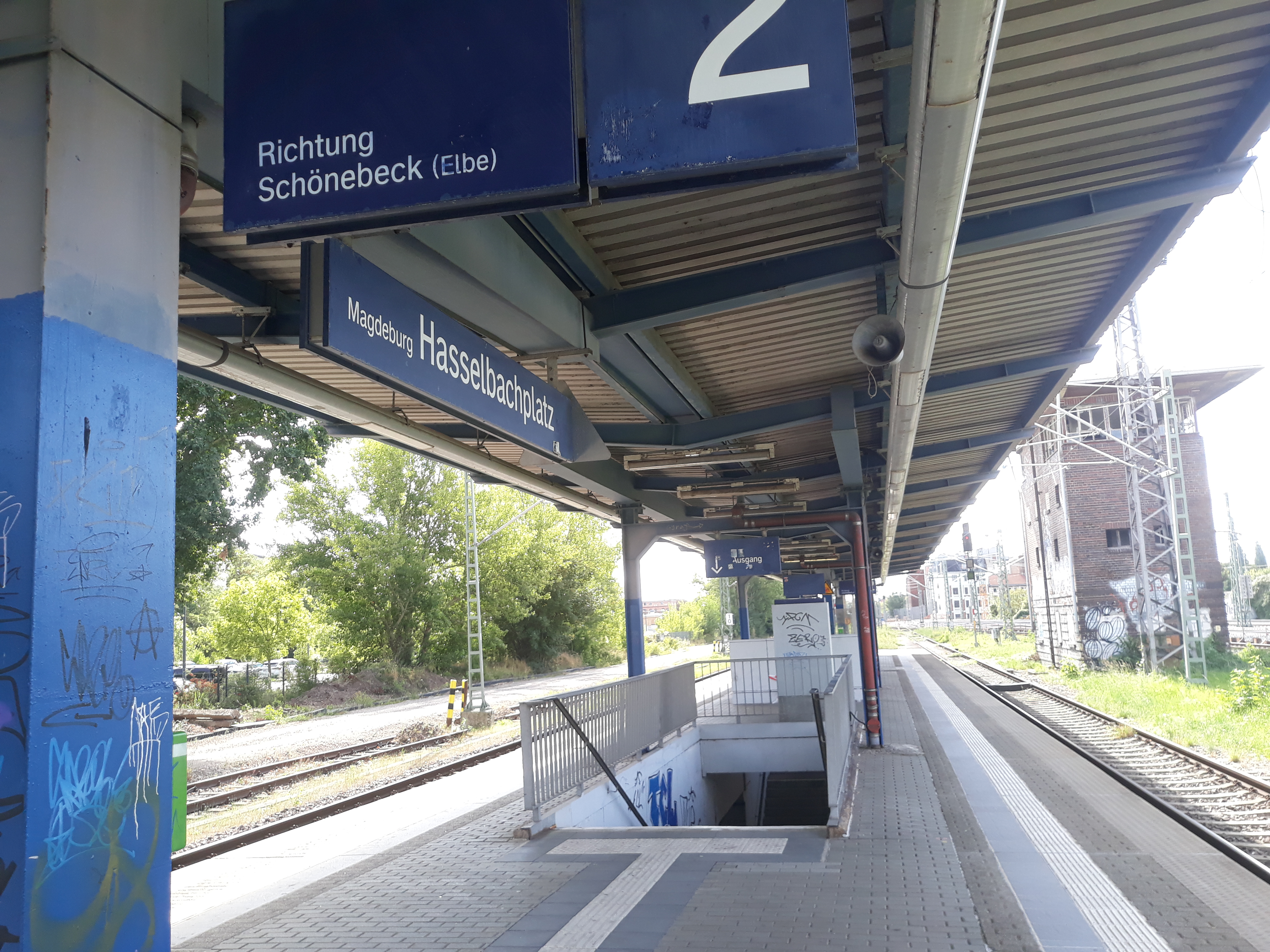

General information
- Location: Bahnhofstraße/Einsteinstraße; 39104 Magdeburg; Saxony-Anhalt; Germany
- Coordinates: 52°07′21″N 11°37′31″E
- Owner: DB Netz
- Operator: DB Station&Service
- Lines: Magdeburg-Leipzig railway (KBS 340)
- Platforms: 1 island platform
- Tracks: 2
- Train operators: S-Bahn Mittelelbe

Other information
- Station code: 3886
- DS100 code: LMGH
- IBNR: 8080660
- Category: 6
- Fare zone: marego: 010
- Website: www.bahnhof.de

History
- Opened: 1974; 52 years ago

Services
Preceding station	Mittelelbe S-Bahn	Following station
Magdeburg-Buckau towards Schönebeck-Bad Salzelmen	S 1	Magdeburg Hbf towards Wittenberge

Other services
Preceding station	Straßenbahn Magdeburg	Following station
Planckstraße towards Westerhüsen	2	Domplatz/Volksbank towards Alte Neustadt
Haeckelstraße/Museum towards Klinikum Olvenstedt	3	Leipziger Straße/Halberstädter Straße towards Leipziger Chaussee
Planckstraße towards Klinikum Olvenstedt	5	Haeckelstraße/Museum towards City Carré
Planckstraße towards Westerhüsen	8	Haeckelstraße/Museum towards Neustädter See
Leipziger Straße/Halberstädter Straße towards Reform	9	Haeckelstraße/Museum towards Neustädter See
Domplatz/Volksbank towards Barleber See	10	Leipziger Straße/Halberstädter Straße towards Sudenburg
Location
- Location within Saxony-Anhalt

Magdeburg-Hasselbachplatz station is a railway station in Magdeburg, capital city of Saxony-Anhalt, Germany, located near the Hasselbachplatz.

== Operation ==
The station is closed from 4 March 2018 until 12 May 2019 due to effects of the construction site at Magdeburg Hauptbahnhof.

== Notable places nearby ==
- Hasselbachplatz
