= Zerbst/Anhalt station =

Railway station in Germany

Zerbst/Anhalt
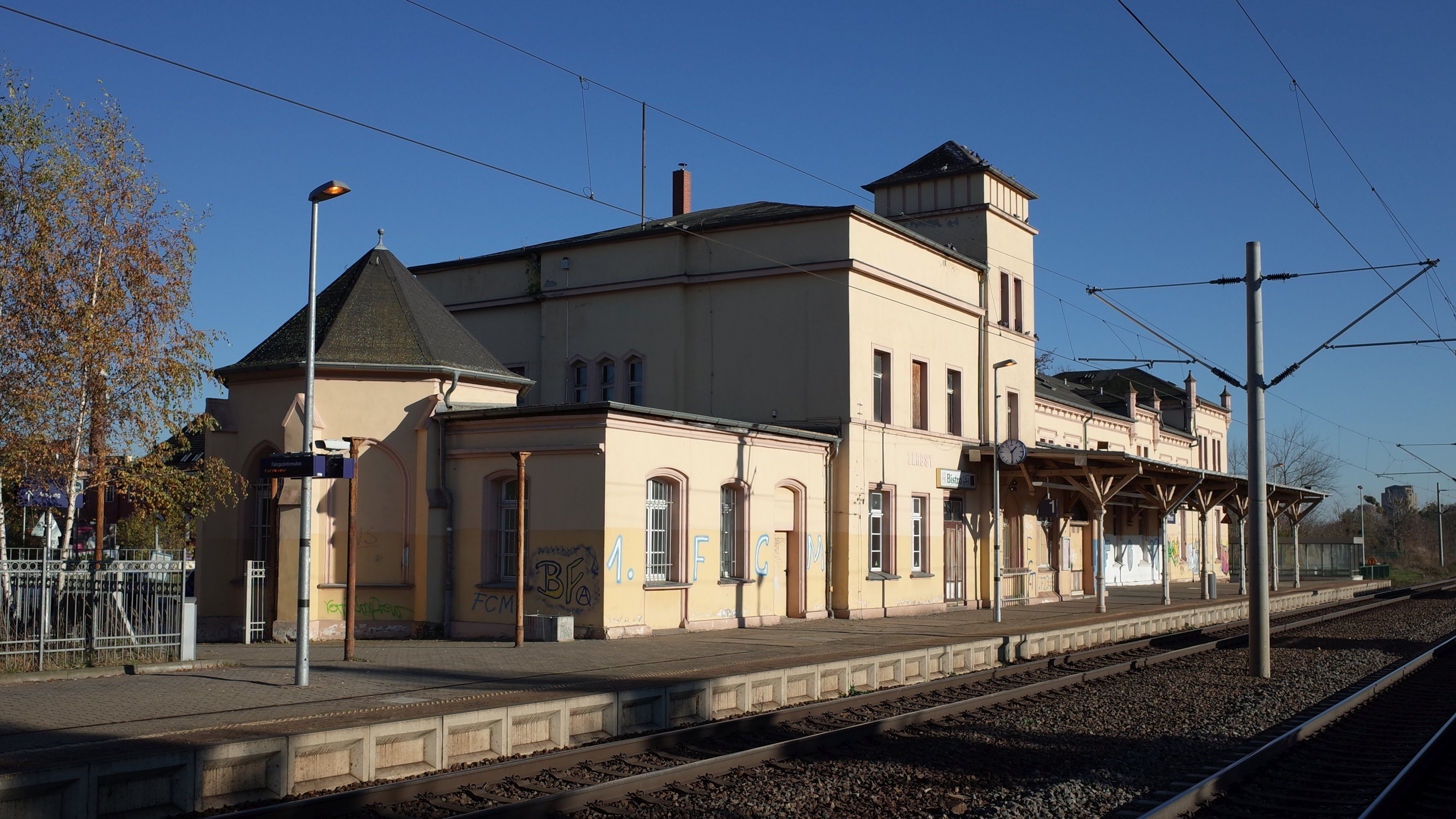
- 2016

General information
- Location: Am Bahnhof 3; 39261 Zerbst/Anhalt; Saxony-Anhalt; Germany
- Coordinates: 51°57′14″N 12°05′20″E
- Owner: DB Netz
- Operator: DB Station&Service
- Lines: Trebnitz–Leipzig railway (KBS 254)
- Platforms: 2 side platforms
- Tracks: 2
- Train operators: DB Regio Südost

Other information
- Station code: 7002
- DS100 code: LZE
- IBNR: 8013389
- Category: 6
- Fare zone: MDV: 275 (rail only)
- Website: www.bahnhof.de

Services
Preceding station	DB Regio Südost	Following station
Güterglück towards Magdeburg Hbf	RE 13	Rodleben towards Leipzig Hbf
Gommern towards Magdeburg Hbf	RE 14	Rodleben towards Falkenberg (Elster)
Location
- Location within Saxony-Anhalt

Zerbst/Anhalt station is a railway station in the municipality of Zerbst/Anhalt, located in the Anhalt-Bitterfeld district in Saxony-Anhalt, Germany.
