= Rodleben station =

Railway station in Germany

Rodleben
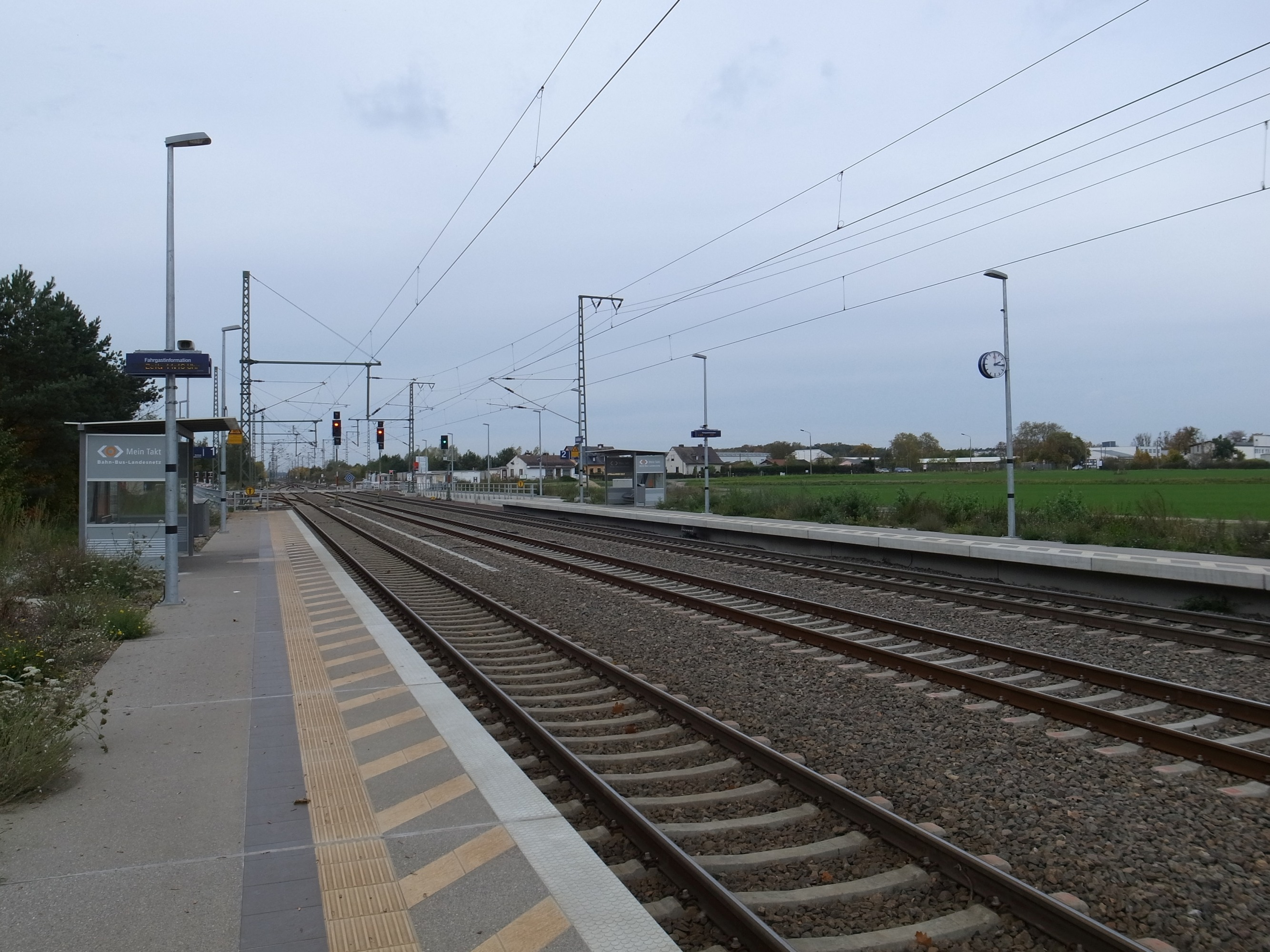
- 2013

General information
- Location: Zerbster Straße 3; 06861 Dessau-Roßlau; Saxony-Anhalt; Germany
- Coordinates: 51°53′51″N 12°13′03″E
- System: Hp
- Owner: DB Netz
- Operator: DB Station&Service
- Lines: Trebnitz–Leipzig railway (KBS 254); Węgliniec–Roßlau railway (KBS 216); Wiesenburg–Roßlau railway (KBS 207)
- Platforms: 2 side platforms
- Tracks: 3
- Train operators: DB Regio Südost

Other information
- Station code: 5313
- DS100 code: LROD
- IBNR: 8012777
- Category: 6
- Fare zone: MDV: 270 (rail only)
- Website: www.bahnhof.de

Services
| Preceding station | DB Regio Südost | Following station |
|---|---|---|
| Zerbst/Anhalt towards Magdeburg Hbf | RE 13 | Roßlau (Elbe) towards Leipzig Hbf |
| Zerbst/Anhalt towards Magdeburg Hbf | RE 14 | Roßlau (Elbe) towards Falkenberg (Elster) |
Location
- Location within Saxony-Anhalt Location within Germany Location within Europe

Rodleben station is a railway station in the Rodleben district of the municipality of Dessau-Roßlau, Saxony-Anhalt, Germany.
