= Manheimer Berlin =

German fashion house

- Trade name: Manheimer Berlin
- Industry: Fashion
- Founder: Valentin Manheimer
- Headquarters: Berlin, Germany

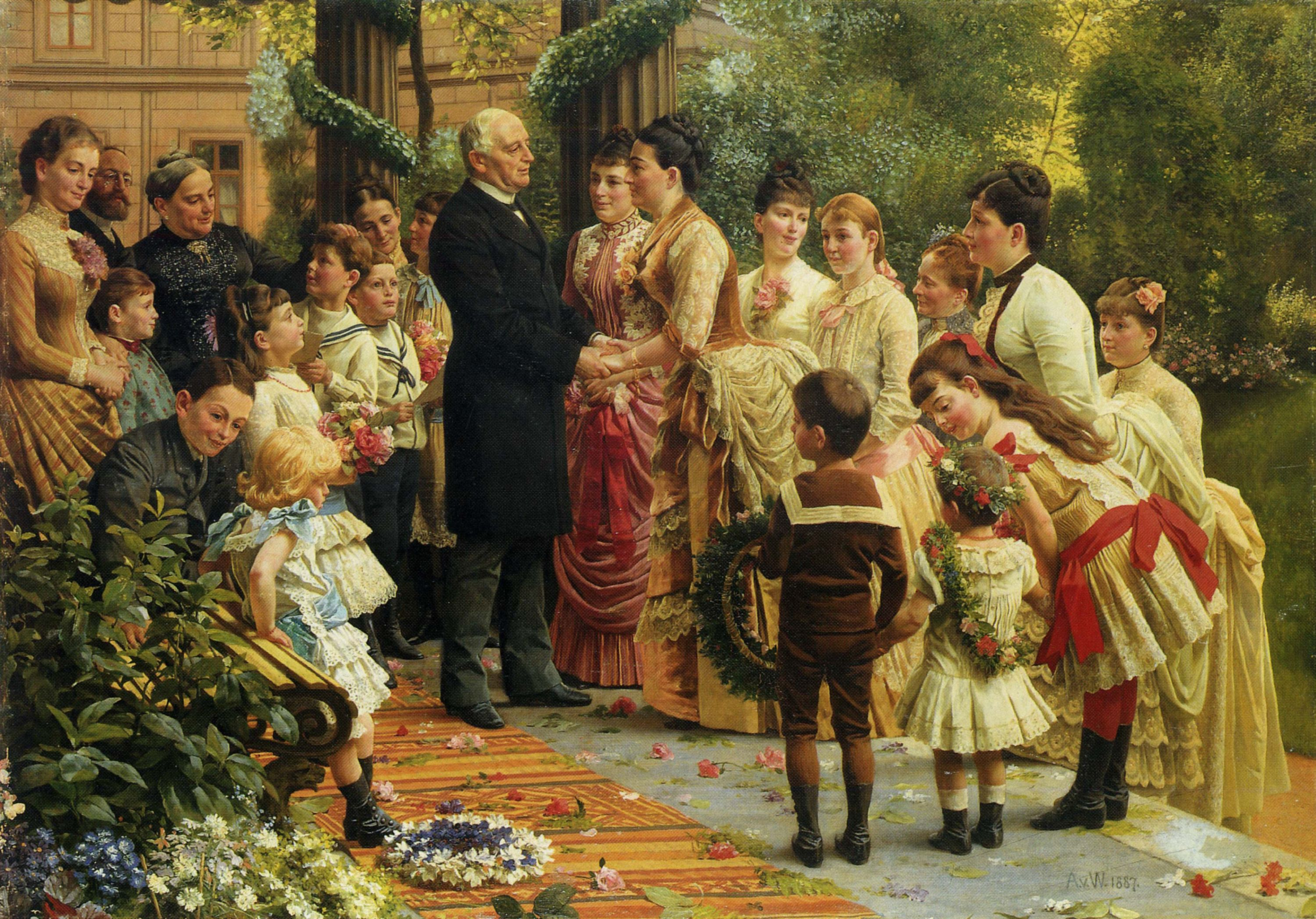
The 70th Birthday of the Commerce Council Valentin Manheimer , painting by Anton von Werner, 1887

Manheimer Berlin is a German fashion house originally founded in 1839. Together with other brands it was at its height in 1920s Germany until its demise in 1929. The company was re-opened in Berlin in December 2018 with the great-great-grandson of Valentin Manheimer, Andreas Valentin in attendance.

== History ==
Berlin's clothing industry goes back to the 19th century. In 1839, German-Jewish entrepreneur Valentin Manheimer, started one of the city's first fashion businesses. At the time Valentin Manheimer, Herrmann Gerson and other Jewish entrepreneurs were the first businesses to offer ladies’ clothing in the Prussian capital. Using the city's network of traditional tailors and stay-at-home seamstresses, he began producing garments in standard sizes, and he became famous for his Berliner Coat (Berliner Mantel).

== Revival ==
After Hitler's rise to power (known as Machtergreifung) in 1933, the Jewish clothing businesses in Berlin, most of them located on and around Hausvogteiplatz, were shut down by Nazi authorities. Valentin Manheimer's great-great-grandson Andreas Valentin is a member of a revived version of Manheimer Berlin founded in the 21st century.

The expired trademark had been acquired by Jandorf Holding.
