= Pietzpuhl =

- Ortsteil of Möser
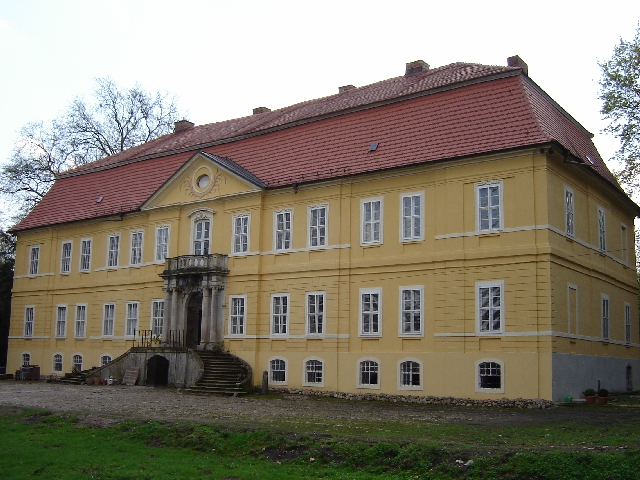
- Palace in Pietzpuhl

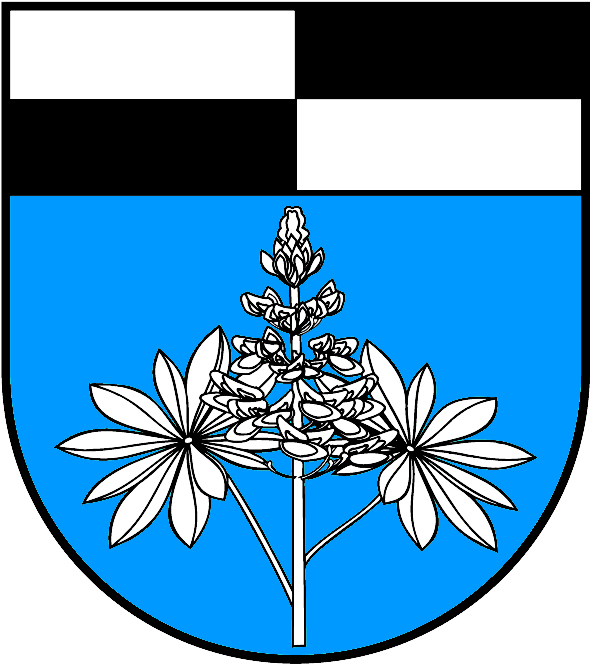
- Coat of arms
- Interactive map of Pietzpuhl
- Location within Germany Location within Saxony-Anhalt
- Coordinates: 52°13′N 11°51′E
- Country: Germany
- State: Saxony-Anhalt
- District: Jerichower Land
- Municipality: Möser

Area
  - Total: 22.09 km^{2} (8.53 sq mi)
- Elevation: 65 m (213 ft)

Population (2006-12-31)
  - Total: 244
  - Density: 11.0/km^{2} (28.6/sq mi)
- Time zone: UTC+01:00 (CET)
  - Summer (DST): UTC+02:00 (CEST)
- Postal codes: 39291
- Dialling codes: 039222
- Website: www.gemeinde-pietzpuhl.de

Pietzpuhl (German pronunciation: [ˈpiːtsˌpuːl]) is a village and a former municipality in the Jerichower Land district, in Saxony-Anhalt, Germany.

Since 1 January 2010, it is part of the municipality Möser.
