= Schermen =

- Ortsteil of Möser
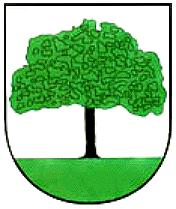
- Coat of arms
- Interactive map of Schermen
- Location within Germany Location within Saxony-Anhalt
- Coordinates: 52°14′N 11°49′E
- Country: Germany
- State: Saxony-Anhalt
- District: Jerichower Land
- Municipality: Möser

Area
  - Total: 11.35 km^{2} (4.38 sq mi)
- Elevation: 62 m (203 ft)

Population (2006-12-31)
  - Total: 1,563
  - Density: 137.7/km^{2} (356.7/sq mi)
- Time zone: UTC+01:00 (CET)
  - Summer (DST): UTC+02:00 (CEST)
- Postal codes: 39291
- Dialling codes: 03921
- Website: www.gemeinde-schermen.de

Schermen (German pronunciation: [ˈʃɛʁmən]) is a village and a former municipality in the Jerichower Land district, in Saxony-Anhalt, Germany.

Since 1 January 2010, it is part of the municipality Möser.
