= Hohenwarthe =

- Ortsteil of Möser
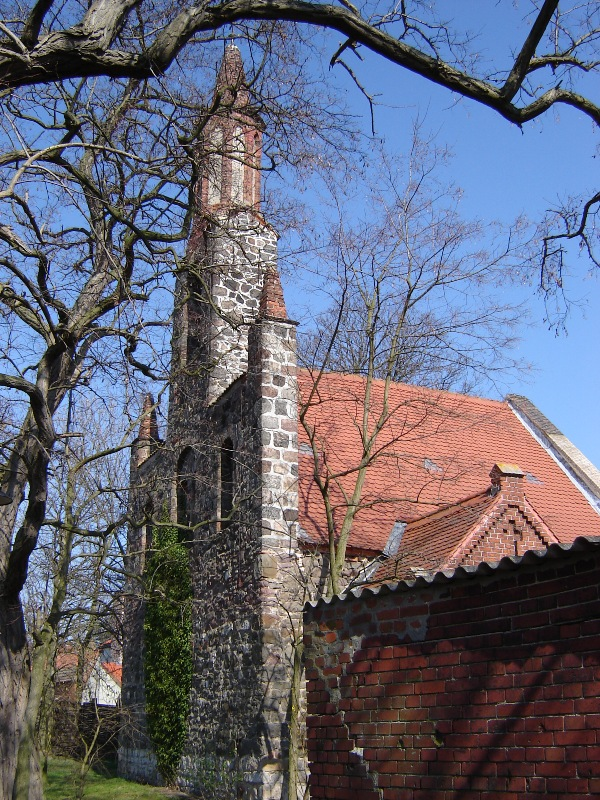
- Church

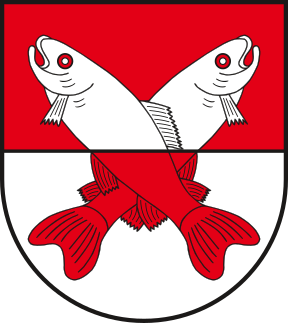
- Coat of arms
- Interactive map of Hohenwarthe
- Location within Germany Location within Saxony-Anhalt
- Coordinates: 52°13′N 11°43′E
- Country: Germany
- State: Saxony-Anhalt
- District: Jerichower Land
- Municipality: Möser

Area
  - Total: 10.25 km^{2} (3.96 sq mi)
- Elevation: 55 m (180 ft)

Population (2006-12-31)
  - Total: 1,463
  - Density: 142.7/km^{2} (369.7/sq mi)
- Time zone: UTC+01:00 (CET)
  - Summer (DST): UTC+02:00 (CEST)
- Postal codes: 39291
- Dialling codes: 039222
- Vehicle registration: JL

Hohenwarthe (German pronunciation: [ˈhoːənˌvaʁtə]) is a village and a former municipality in the Jerichower Land district, in Saxony-Anhalt, Germany.

Since 1 January 2010, it is part of the municipality Möser.
