= Königsborn =

- Ortsteil of Biederitz
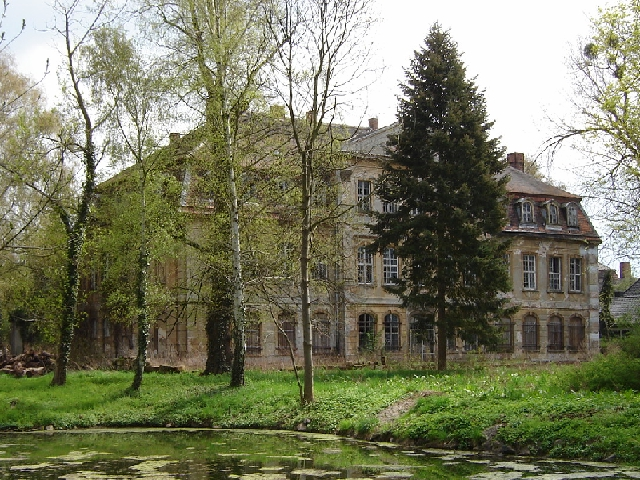
- Ruins of the Neu Königsborner Schloss

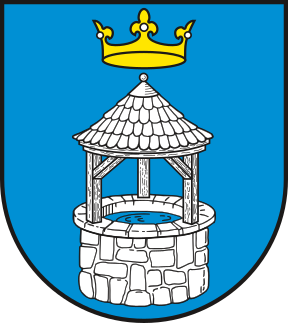
- Coat of arms
- Interactive map of Königsborn
- Location within Germany Location within Saxony-Anhalt
- Coordinates: 52°8′N 11°46′E
- Country: Germany
- State: Saxony-Anhalt
- District: Jerichower Land
- Municipality: Biederitz
- Subdivisions: Alt- and Neu Königsborn

Area
  - Total: 5.31 km^{2} (2.05 sq mi)
- Elevation: 49 m (161 ft)

Population (2006-12-31)
  - Total: 602
  - Density: 113/km^{2} (294/sq mi)
- Time zone: UTC+01:00 (CET)
  - Summer (DST): UTC+02:00 (CEST)
- Postal codes: 39175
- Dialling codes: 039292

Königsborn (German pronunciation: [ˈkøːnɪçsˌbɔʁn]) is a village and a former municipality in the Jerichower Land district, in Saxony-Anhalt, Germany.

Since 1 January 2010, it is part of the municipality Biederitz.

It is a spa near Magdeburg, Germany, immediately to the North of the town of Gerwisch, of which it practically forms a suburb.
