= Lostau =

- Ortsteil of Möser
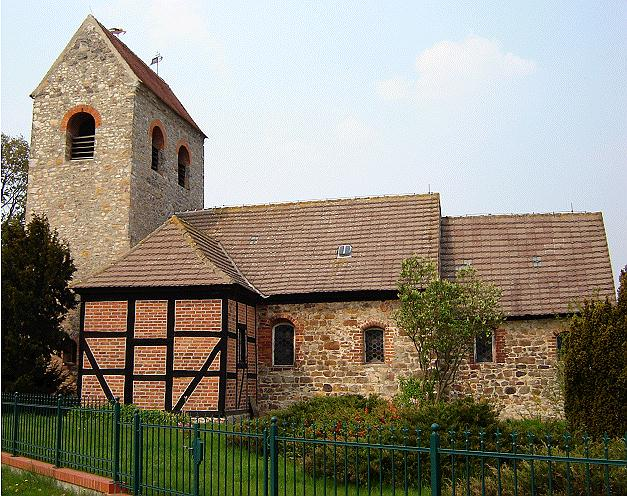
- Church

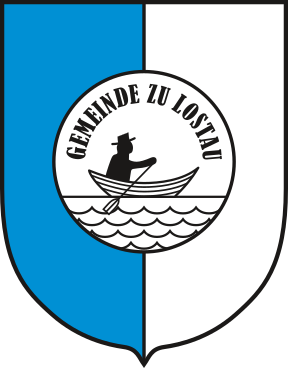
- Coat of arms
- Interactive map of Lostau
- Location within Germany Location within Saxony-Anhalt
- Coordinates: 52°13′N 11°45′E
- Country: Germany
- State: Saxony-Anhalt
- District: Jerichower Land
- Municipality: Möser

Area
  - Total: 14.42 km^{2} (5.57 sq mi)
- Elevation: 74 m (243 ft)

Population (2006-12-31)
  - Total: 1,911
  - Density: 132.5/km^{2} (343.2/sq mi)
- Time zone: UTC+01:00 (CET)
  - Summer (DST): UTC+02:00 (CEST)
- Postal codes: 39291
- Dialling codes: 039222
- Website: www.gemeinde-lostau.de

Lostau is a village and a former municipality in the Jerichower Land district, in Saxony-Anhalt, Germany.

Since 1 January 2010, it is part of the municipality Möser.
