= Lübs, Saxony-Anhalt =

Lübs
- Stadtteil of Gommern
- Saint Philip church in Lübs

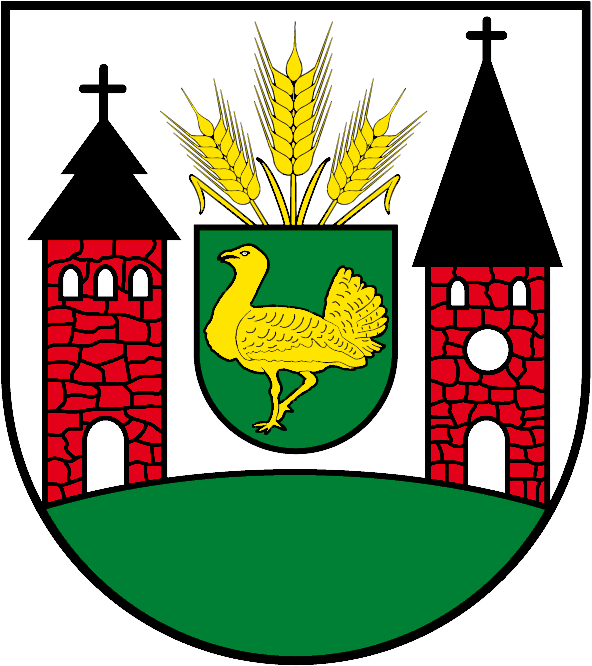
- Coat of arms
- Interactive map of Lübs
- Location within Germany Location within Saxony-Anhalt
- Coordinates: 52°1′N 11°55′E
- Country: Germany
- State: Saxony-Anhalt
- District: Jerichower Land
- Town: Gommern

Area
  - Total: 14.76 km^{2} (5.70 sq mi)
- Elevation: 70 m (230 ft)

Population (2006-12-31)
  - Total: 404
  - Density: 27.4/km^{2} (70.9/sq mi)
- Time zone: UTC+01:00 (CET)
  - Summer (DST): UTC+02:00 (CEST)
- Postal codes: 39264
- Dialling codes: 039242
- Vehicle registration: JL
- Website: www.gommern.de

Lübs (German pronunciation: [lʏps]) is a village and a former municipality in the Jerichower Land district, in Saxony-Anhalt, in east-central Germany. Since 1 January 2009, it is part of the town Gommern.
