= Magdeburg-Sudenburg station =

Railway station in Magdeburg, Germany

Magdeburg-Sudenburg

General information
- Location: Am Sudenburger Bahnhof 3; 39110 Magdeburg; Saxony-Anhalt; Germany
- Coordinates: 52.1203°N 11.5966°E
- Owner: DB Netz
- Operator: DB Station&Service
- Lines: Brunswick–Magdeburg railway (KBS 310)
- Platforms: 1 island platform
- Tracks: 4
- Train operators: DB Regio Südost

Other information
- Station code: 3890
- DS100 code: LMS
- IBNR: 8012292
- Category: 6
- Fare zone: marego: 010
- Website: www.bahnhof.de

History
- Opened: 1872; 154 years ago

Services
Preceding station	DB Regio Südost	Following station
Niederndodeleben towards Braunschweig Hbf	RB 40	Magdeburg Hbf towards Burg (bei Magdeburg)

Other services
Preceding station	Straßenbahn Magdeburg	Following station
Südring towards Kannenstieg	1	Terminus
Hasselbachplatz towards Barleber See	10	Terminus
Südring towards Buckau	13	Terminus
Location
- Location within Saxony-Anhalt

Magdeburg-Sudenburg station is the most westerly railway station in Magdeburg, capital city of Saxony-Anhalt, Germany, located in the Sudenburg district.

It was opened for passenger and freight traffic in 1872. In 1932, a connecting curve was created between Sudenburg and Buckau stations. An adjacent container station was put into operation in 1967. After the fall of the Berlin Wall in 1990, this was no longer needed. Since 22 June 2003, the station has been controlled by the electronic signal box of the main station. In June/July 2014, extensive track renewal work was carried out.
