= Möser =

- Municipality
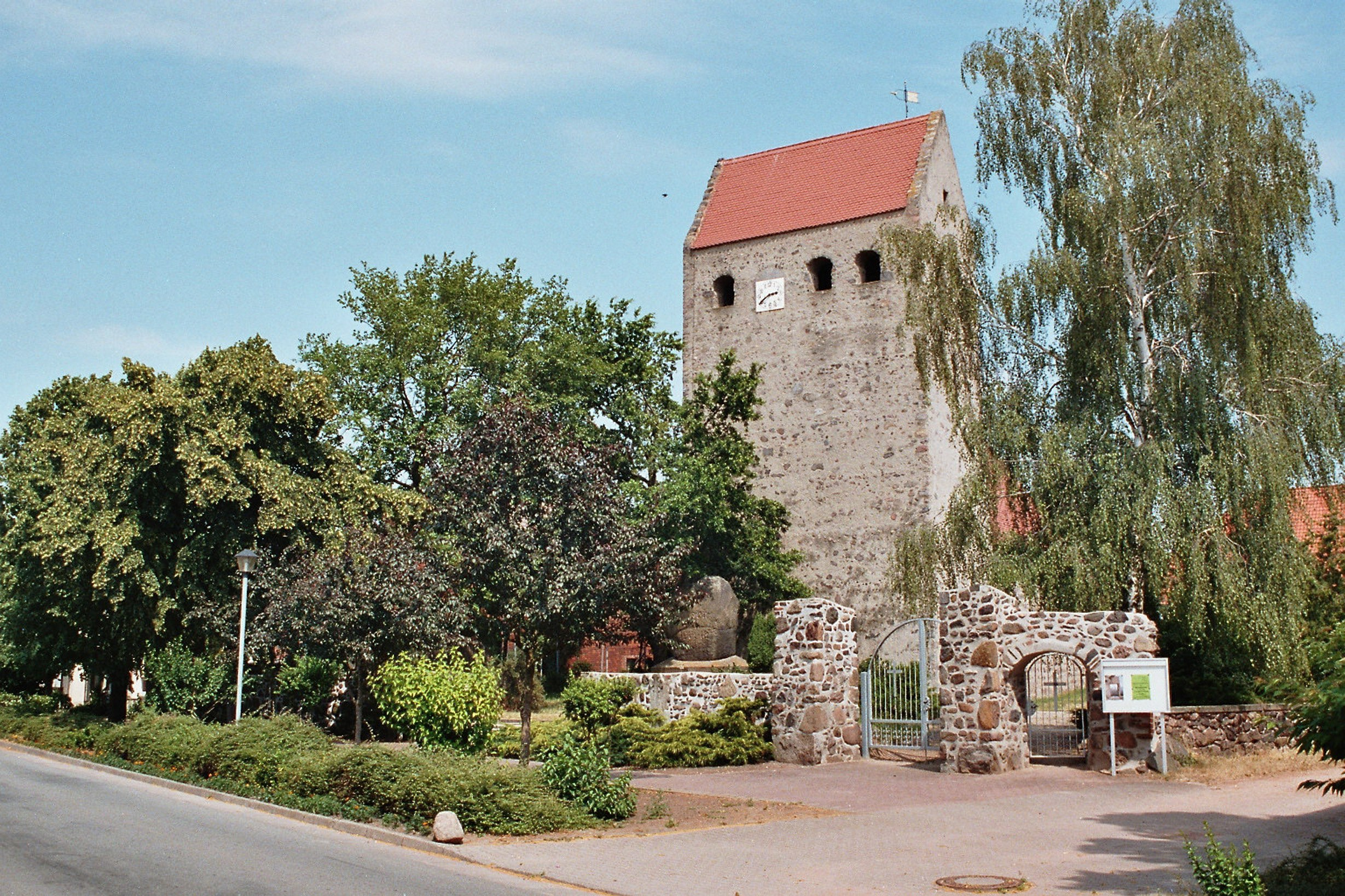
- Church in the municipal part of Körbelitz

- Coat of arms

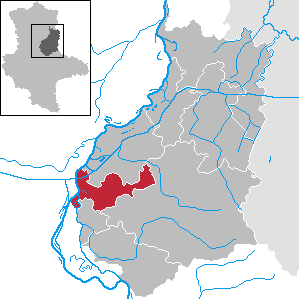
- Location of Möser within Jerichower Land district
- Interactive map of Möser
- Location within Germany Location within Saxony-Anhalt
- Coordinates: 52°13′N 11°48′E
- Country: Germany
- State: Saxony-Anhalt
- District: Jerichower Land

Government
  - Mayor (2023–30): Marko Simon (SPD)

Area
  - Total: 80.24 km^{2} (30.98 sq mi)
- Elevation: 62 m (203 ft)

Population (2025-12-31)
  - Total: 8,381
  - Density: 104.4/km^{2} (270.5/sq mi)
- Time zone: UTC+01:00 (CET)
  - Summer (DST): UTC+02:00 (CEST)
- Postal codes: 39291
- Dialling codes: 039222
- Vehicle registration: JL
- Website: www.gemeinde-moeser.de

Möser (German pronunciation: [ˈmøːzɐ]) is a municipality in the Jerichower Land district, in Saxony-Anhalt, Germany.

On 1 January 2010, the municipality (Einheitsgemeinde) of Möser was formed by the merger of six former municipalities. These six former municipalities became Ortschaften or municipal divisions of the new municipality Möser:

- Hohenwarthe
- Körbelitz
- Lostau
- Möser
- Pietzpuhl
- Schermen
