= Gübs =

- Ortsteil of Biederitz
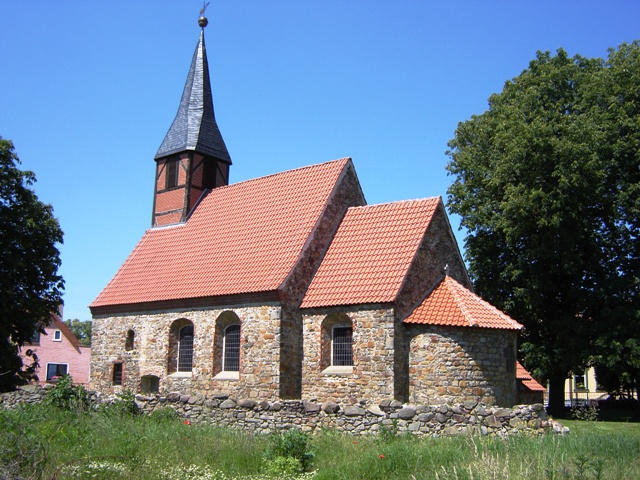
- Saint Andrew Church

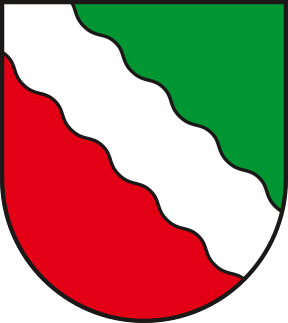
- Coat of arms
- Interactive map of Gübs
- Location within Germany Location within Saxony-Anhalt
- Coordinates: 52°6′N 11°44′E
- Country: Germany
- State: Saxony-Anhalt
- District: Jerichower Land
- Municipality: Biederitz

Area
  - Total: 6.57 km^{2} (2.54 sq mi)
- Elevation: 44 m (144 ft)

Population (2006-12-31)
  - Total: 353
  - Density: 53.7/km^{2} (139/sq mi)
- Time zone: UTC+01:00 (CET)
  - Summer (DST): UTC+02:00 (CEST)
- Postal codes: 39175
- Dialling codes: 039292

Gübs (German pronunciation: [ɡʏps]) is a village and a former municipality in the Jerichower Land district, in Saxony-Anhalt, Germany.

Since 1 January 2010, it has been part of the municipality Biederitz.
