= Woltersdorf, Saxony-Anhalt =

Woltersdorf
- Ortsteil of Biederitz
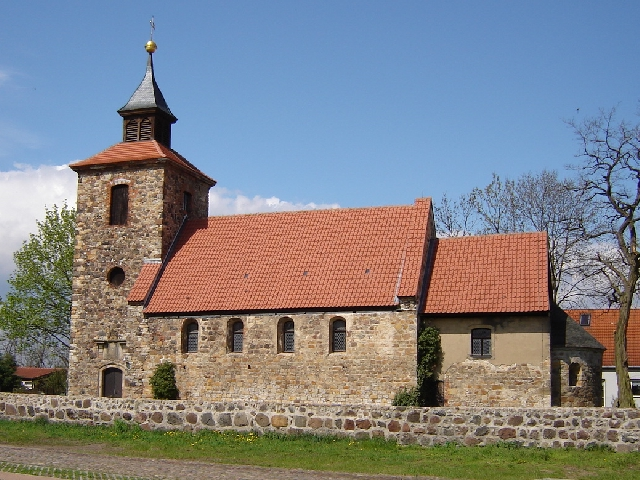
- Protestant Church

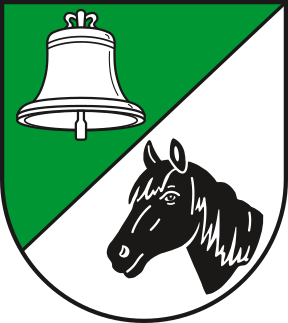
- Coat of arms
- Interactive map of Woltersdorf
- Location within Germany Location within Saxony-Anhalt
- Coordinates: 52°9′N 11°46′E
- Country: Germany
- State: Saxony-Anhalt
- District: Jerichower Land
- Municipality: Biederitz

Area
  - Total: 8.89 km^{2} (3.43 sq mi)
- Elevation: 50 m (160 ft)

Population (2006-12-31)
  - Total: 403
  - Density: 45.3/km^{2} (117/sq mi)
- Time zone: UTC+01:00 (CET)
  - Summer (DST): UTC+02:00 (CEST)
- Postal codes: 39175
- Dialling codes: 039292

Woltersdorf (German pronunciation: [ˈvɔltɐsdɔʁf]) is a village and a former municipality in the Jerichower Land district, in Saxony-Anhalt, Germany.

Since 1 January 2010, it is part of the municipality Biederitz.
