= Körbelitz =

- Ortsteil of Möser
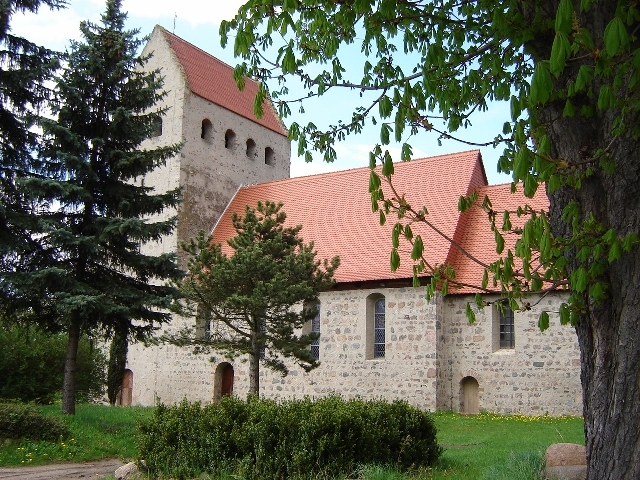
- Protestant Church

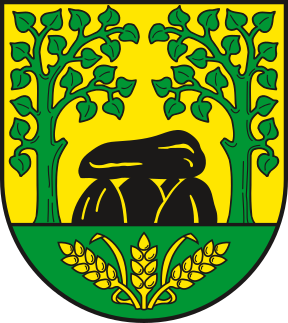
- Coat of arms
- Interactive map of Körbelitz
- Location within Germany Location within Saxony-Anhalt
- Coordinates: 52°11′N 11°47′E
- Country: Germany
- State: Saxony-Anhalt
- District: Jerichower Land
- Municipality: Möser

Area
  - Total: 17.00 km^{2} (6.56 sq mi)
- Elevation: 57 m (187 ft)

Population (2006-12-31)
  - Total: 481
  - Density: 28.3/km^{2} (73.3/sq mi)
- Time zone: UTC+01:00 (CET)
  - Summer (DST): UTC+02:00 (CEST)
- Postal codes: 39175
- Dialling codes: 039222
- Website: www.gemeinde-koerbelitz.de

Körbelitz is a village and a former municipality in the Jerichower Land district, in Saxony-Anhalt, Germany.

Since 1 January 2010, it is part of the municipality Möser.
