= Güterglück =

- Stadtteil of Zerbst
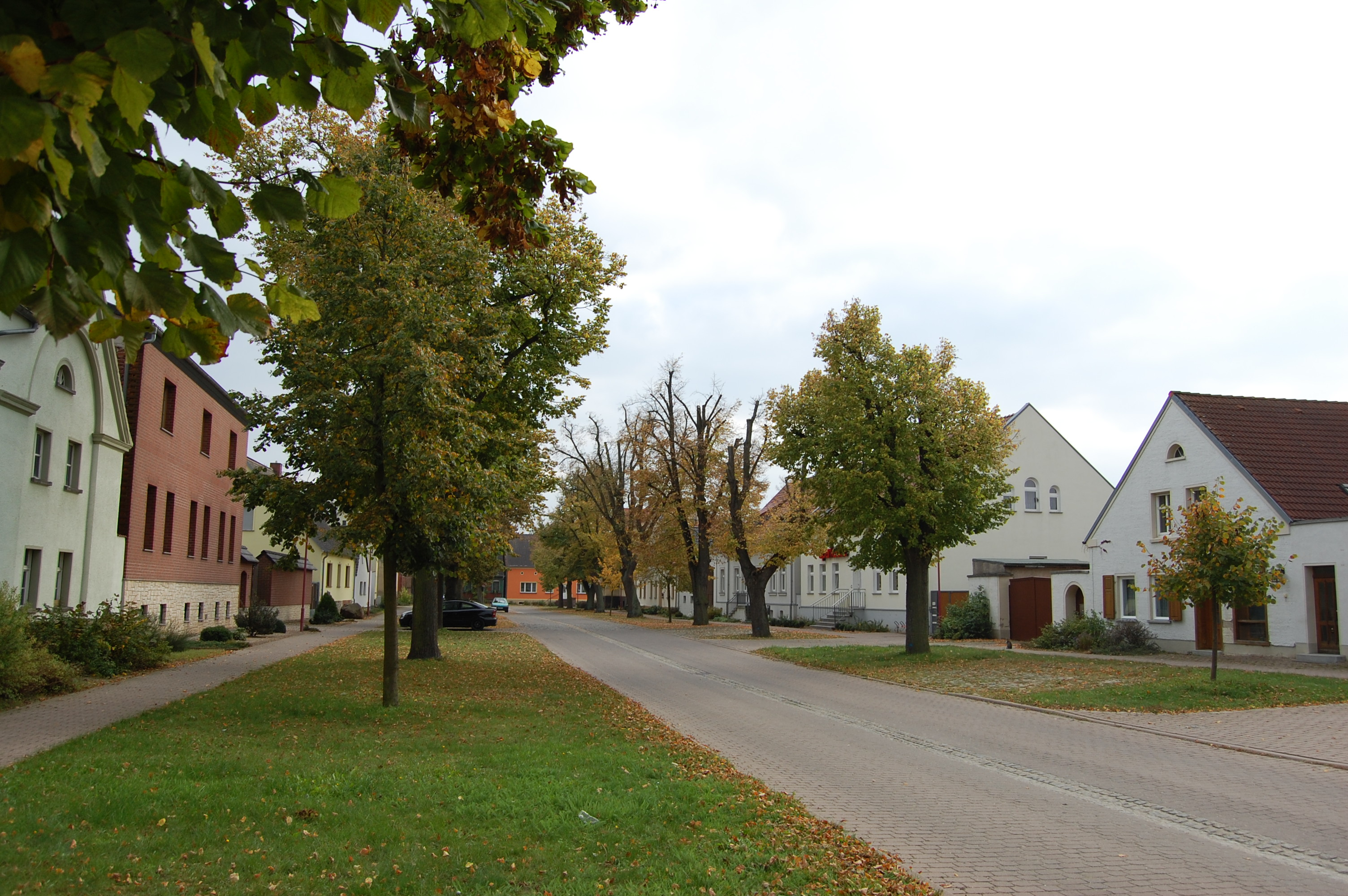
- Road in Güterglück, October 2010

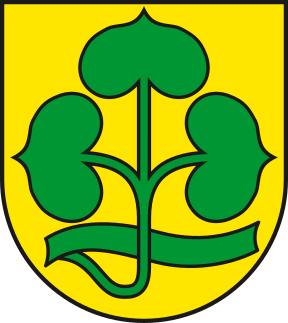
- Coat of arms
- Interactive map of Güterglück
- Location within Germany Location within Saxony-Anhalt
- Coordinates: 51°59′38″N 11°59′31″E
- Country: Germany
- State: Saxony-Anhalt
- District: Anhalt-Bitterfeld
- Town: Zerbst

Area
  - Total: 10.66 km^{2} (4.12 sq mi)
- Elevation: 67 m (220 ft)

Population (2006-12-31)
  - Total: 735
  - Density: 68.9/km^{2} (179/sq mi)
- Time zone: UTC+01:00 (CET)
  - Summer (DST): UTC+02:00 (CEST)
- Postal codes: 39264
- Dialling codes: 039247
- Vehicle registration: ABI

Güterglück (German pronunciation: [ˈɡyːtɐɡlʏk]) is a village and a former municipality in the district of Anhalt-Bitterfeld, in Saxony-Anhalt, Germany.

Since 1 January 2010, it is part of the town Zerbst.
