= Prödel =

- Stadtteil of Gommern
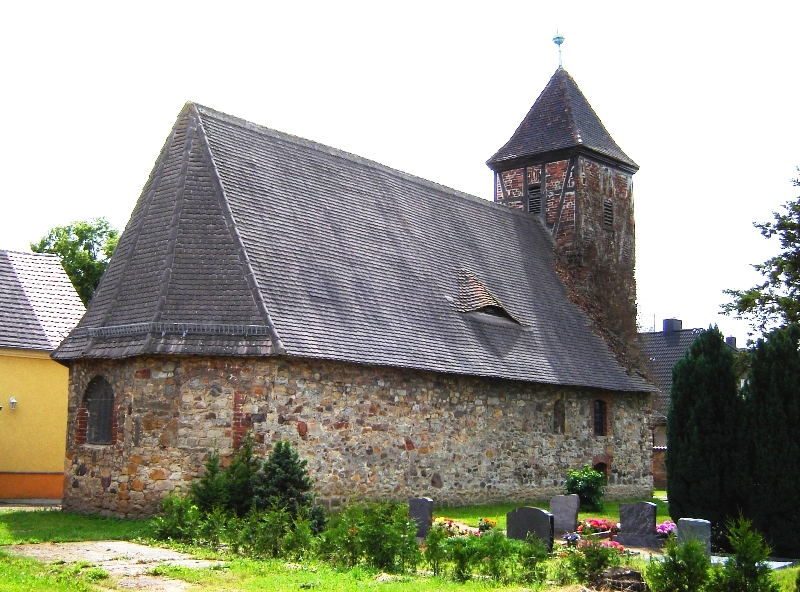
- Church in Prödel

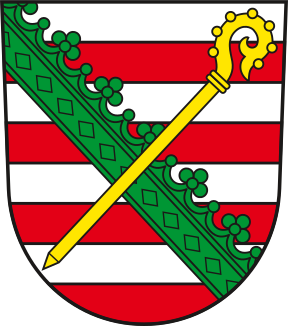
- Coat of arms
- Interactive map of Prödel
- Location within Germany Location within Saxony-Anhalt
- Coordinates: 52°2′N 11°55′E
- Country: Germany
- State: Saxony-Anhalt
- District: Jerichower Land
- Town: Gommern

Area
  - Total: 5.31 km^{2} (2.05 sq mi)
- Elevation: 73 m (240 ft)

Population (2017-12-31)
  - Total: 221
  - Density: 41.6/km^{2} (108/sq mi)
- Time zone: UTC+01:00 (CET)
  - Summer (DST): UTC+02:00 (CEST)
- Postal codes: 39264
- Dialling codes: 039242
- Vehicle registration: JL
- Website: www.gommern.de

Prödel (German pronunciation: [ˈpʁøːdl̩]) is a former municipality in the Jerichower Land district, in Saxony-Anhalt, in east-central Germany. Since 1 January 2008, it is part of the town Gommern.
