= Gerwisch =

- Ortsteil of Biederitz
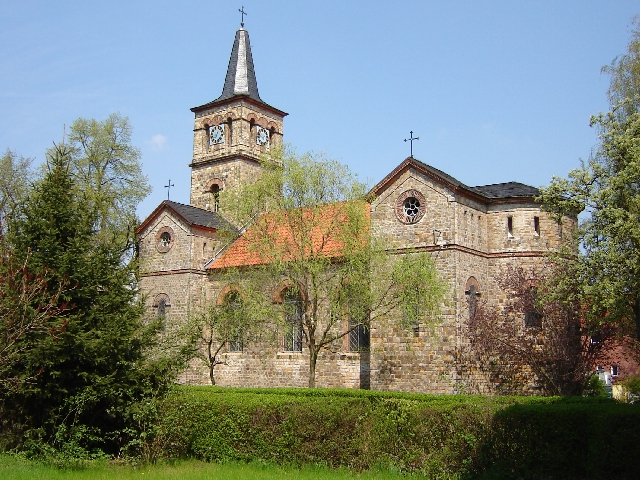
- Church

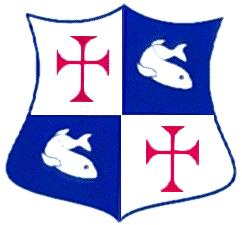
- Coat of arms
- Interactive map of Gerwisch
- Location within Germany Location within Saxony-Anhalt
- Coordinates: 52°10′N 11°45′E
- Country: Germany
- State: Saxony-Anhalt
- District: Jerichower Land
- Municipality: Biederitz

Area
  - Total: 7.61 km^{2} (2.94 sq mi)
- Elevation: 46 m (151 ft)

Population (2006-12-31)
  - Total: 2,651
  - Density: 348/km^{2} (902/sq mi)
- Time zone: UTC+01:00 (CET)
  - Summer (DST): UTC+02:00 (CEST)
- Postal codes: 39175
- Dialling codes: 039292
- Vehicle registration: JL
- Website: www.Gemeinde-Gerwisch.de

Gerwisch (German pronunciation: [ˈɡɛʁvɪʃ]) is a village and a former municipality in the Jerichower Land district, in Saxony-Anhalt, Germany.

Since 1 January 2010, it is part of the municipality Biederitz.
