= Biederitz =

- Municipality
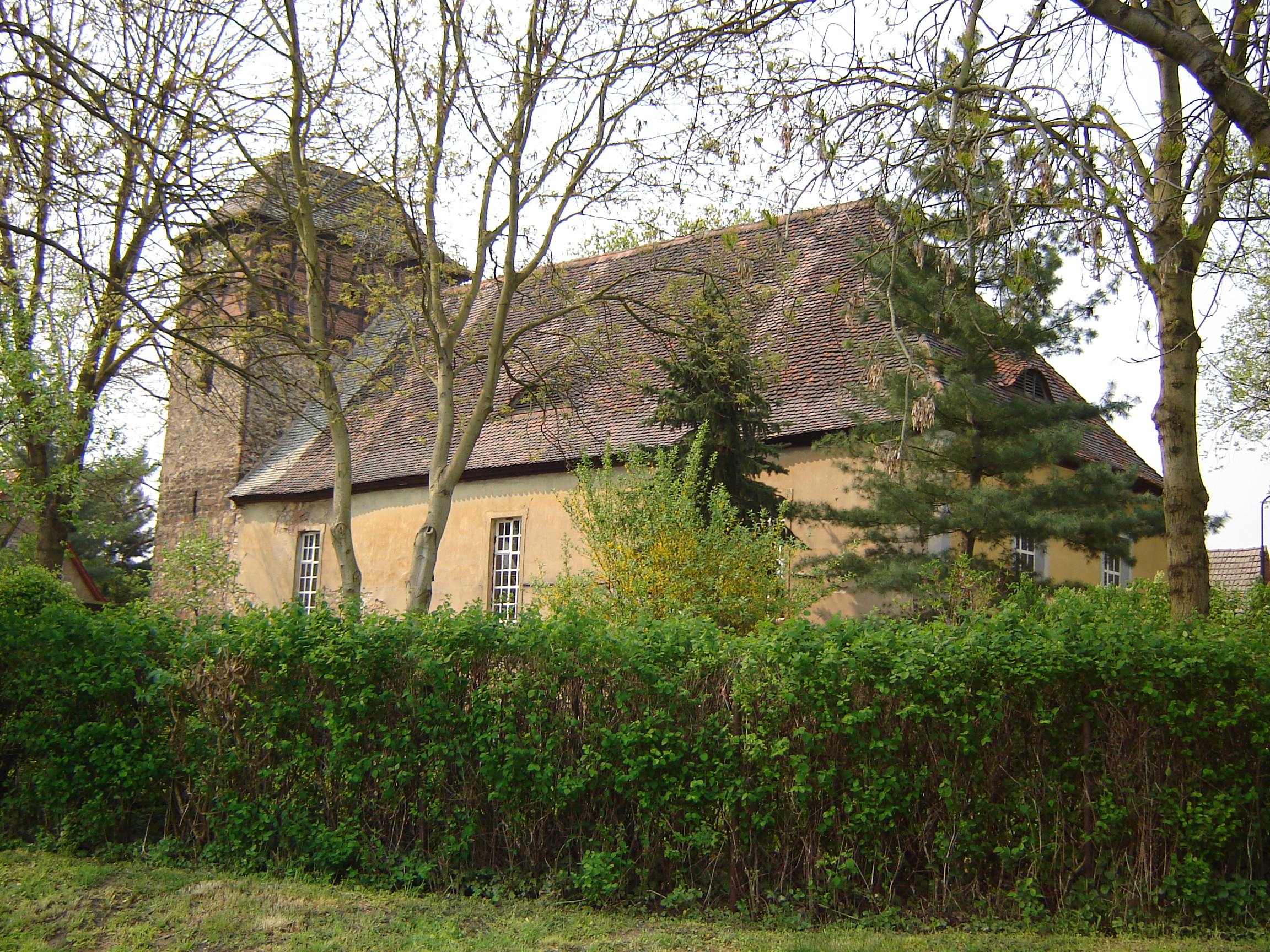
- Protestant church

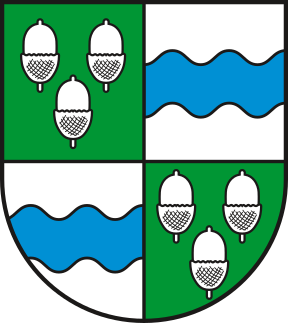
- Coat of arms

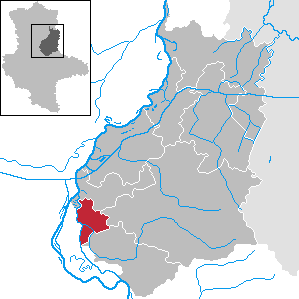
- Location of Biederitz within Jerichower Land district
- Interactive map of Biederitz
- Location within Germany Location within Saxony-Anhalt
- Coordinates: 52°9′39″N 11°43′4″E
- Country: Germany
- State: Saxony-Anhalt
- District: Jerichower Land

Government
  - Mayor (2023–30): Kay Gericke (SPD)

Area
  - Total: 39.33 km^{2} (15.19 sq mi)
- Elevation: 45 m (148 ft)

Population (2025-12-31)
  - Total: 8,458
  - Density: 215.1/km^{2} (557.0/sq mi)
- Time zone: UTC+01:00 (CET)
  - Summer (DST): UTC+02:00 (CEST)
- Postal codes: 39175
- Dialling codes: 039292
- Vehicle registration: JL
- Website: www.gemeinde-biederitz.eu

Biederitz (German pronunciation: [ˈbiːdəʁɪts]) is a municipality in the Jerichower Land district, in Saxony-Anhalt, Germany. It consists of the following Ortschaften or municipal divisions:

- Biederitz
- Gerwisch
- Gübs
- Heyrothsberge
- Königsborn
- Woltersdorf

Gerwisch, Gübs, Königsborn and Woltersdorf were merged into the municipality Biederitz in January 2010.
