= Biederitz–Trebnitz railway =

Railway line in Germany

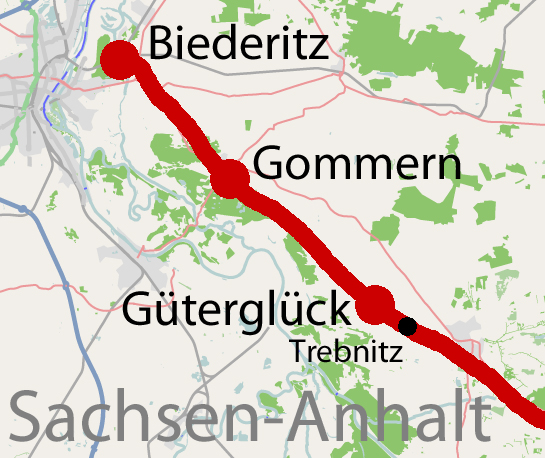

Overview
- Line number: 6410
- Locale: Saxony-Anhalt, Germany

Service
- Route number: 254

Technical
- Line length: 30.3 km (18.8 mi)
- Track gauge: 1,435 mm (4 ft 8 1/2 in) standard gauge
- Electrification: 15 kV/16.7 Hz AC overhead catenary

The Biederitz–Trebnitz railway is a double-tracked, standard gauge, electrified railway line in the German state of Saxony-Anhalt timetabled as (KBS) 254 and 256. The line begins in Biederitz near Magdeburg and runs via Güterglück towards Dessau. According to Deutsche Bahn, the line ends at Trebnitz on the former border between the Duchy of Anhalt and Prussia.

== History ==
In order to link the town of Zerbst to the rapidly growing railway network, the parliament of the Duchy of Anhalt decided to build a 13 kilometre long railway from Roßlau an der Elbe to Zerbst. This was opened on 1 November 1863. The operator was the Berlin-Anhalt Railway Company who purchased the line on 1 October 1871 for a million marks and extended it on 1 July 1874 to Magdeburg. Until 1871 the section from Zerbst to Roßlau was called the Anhalt Leopold Railway (German: Anhaltische Leopoldsbahn). In 1882 the Prussian state railways took over the route.

The Biederitz–Trebnitz was opened eleven years later together with the Roßlau–Trebnitz section of the Trebnitz–Leipzig railway. Both sections are operated today as one route with timetable number 254.

The two-track line was electrified in 1923 as part of the Leipzig–Dessau–Magdeburg route. In 1946, the electrification was restored throughout the central German rail network, but the infrastructure was abruptly dismantled and delivered together with the locomotives to the USSR as war reparations. At the same time the second track was dismantled.

In the 1970s, the second track was restored. On 15 April 1975, electrical operations were resumed between Magdeburg Neustadt and Zerbst.

== Route ==
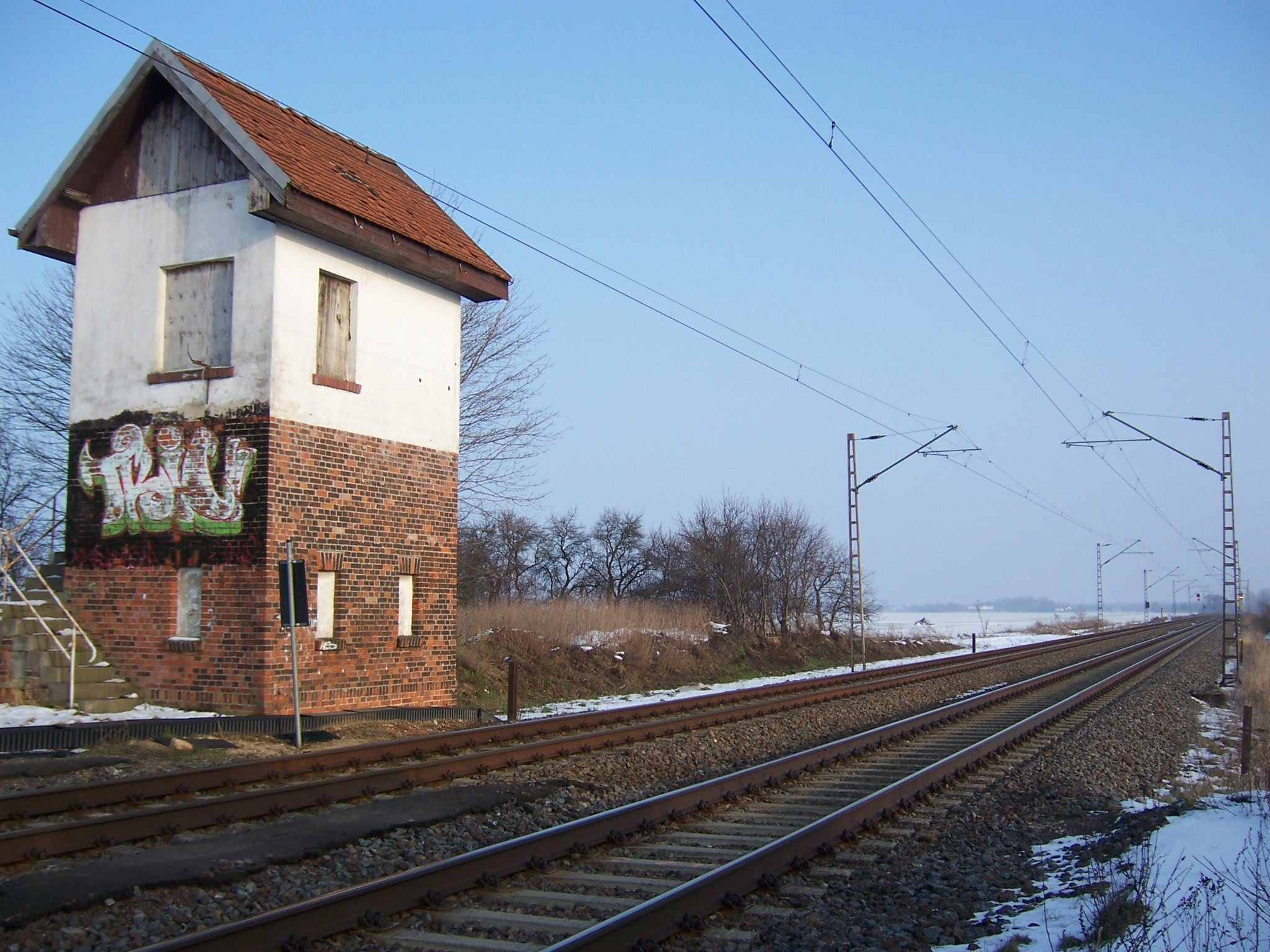
End of line at Trebnitz block post

The line passes the junction of the branch line to Altengrabow and then runs for its entire length to the southeast. After crossing federal highway 1, it runs largely parallel with federal highway 184, which it passes under at Gommern. It has already crossed a level crossing over federal highway 246 in Königsborn. At the former “tower station” (Turmbahnhof, that is two-level interchange station) of Güterglück, it crosses a disused section of the Berlin-Blankenheim railway (Kanonenbahn). After about three kilometres, the line ends at the former Trebnitz block post, north of the village of the same name and continues with a change of line number as the Trebnitz–Leipzig railway.

== Operations ==
From 1993 to 1995, the section from Biederitz to the connecting curve to the Berlin-Blankenheim railway at Güterglück was part of a long-distance route served by Intercity-Express and Intercity trains from western Germany to Berlin during the upgrading of the Berlin–Magdeburg Railway, when the Güterglück–Belzig–Berlin-Wannsee was used as a detour at speeds up to 160 km/h. From 1994 there was also a pair of InterRegio trains with almost annual changes in route between Saxony and eastern Thuringia and north-west Germany. This long-distance train stopped between Magdeburg and Dessau only in Zerbst.

Currently passenger services on this line are operated by DB Regio. It is served every two hours by Regional-Express service RE 13 (Magdeburg–Dessau–Leipzig) and by Regionalbahn service RB 42 (Magdeburg–Dessau). In the peak hour there are additional services operating as RE 15 (Magdeburg–Lutherstadt Wittenberg).
