= Gommern =

- Town
- Town hall

- Coat of arms

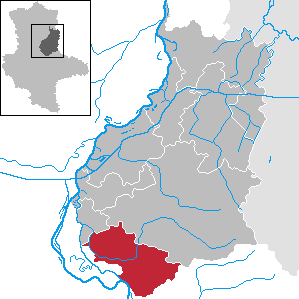
- Location of Gommern within Jerichower Land district
- Interactive map of Gommern
- Location within Germany Location within Saxony-Anhalt
- Coordinates: 52°4′N 11°50′E
- Country: Germany
- State: Saxony-Anhalt
- District: Jerichower Land

Government
  - Mayor (2019–26): Jens Hünerbein (Ind.)

Area
  - Total: 159.98 km^{2} (61.77 sq mi)
- Elevation: 54 m (177 ft)

Population (2025-12-31)
  - Total: 10,049
  - Density: 62.814/km^{2} (162.69/sq mi)
- Time zone: UTC+01:00 (CET)
  - Summer (DST): UTC+02:00 (CEST)
- Postal codes: 39245
- Dialling codes: 039200
- Vehicle registration: JL
- Website: www.gommern.de

Gommern (German pronunciation: [ˈɡɔmɐn]) is a town in the Jerichower Land district, in Saxony-Anhalt, in east-central Germany. It is situated approximately 15 km (9 mi) southeast of Magdeburg.

== History ==
In 1017, during the German–Polish War, the present-day district of Leitzkau was the site where German, Czech and Veleti forces combined for a joint invasion of Poland.

Under Nazi Germany, Gommern was the location of a Nazi prison, and the present day district of Karith-Pöthen was the location of a forced labour subcamp of the Nazi prison in Magdeburg. Following World War II, it formed part of East Germany until 1990.

On January 1, 2005, the municipalities Dannigkow, Dornburg, Karith, Ladeburg, Leitzkau, Menz, Nedlitz, Vehlitz and Wahlitz have been incorporated into Gommern. On January 1, 2008, Prödel was incorporated, and on January 1, 2009, Lübs was incorporated.

== Local council ==
Elections in October 2005:

Party	Vote share
SPD	33.7%
FDP	24.0%
CDU	23.5%
FWGL	9.4%
The Left	9.3%

Elections in May 2014:

Party	Vote share	No. seats
CDU	30.7%	9
FWGL	24.8%	7
SPD	18.5%	5
The Left	11.1%	3
FDP	6.7%	2

== Dornburg ==
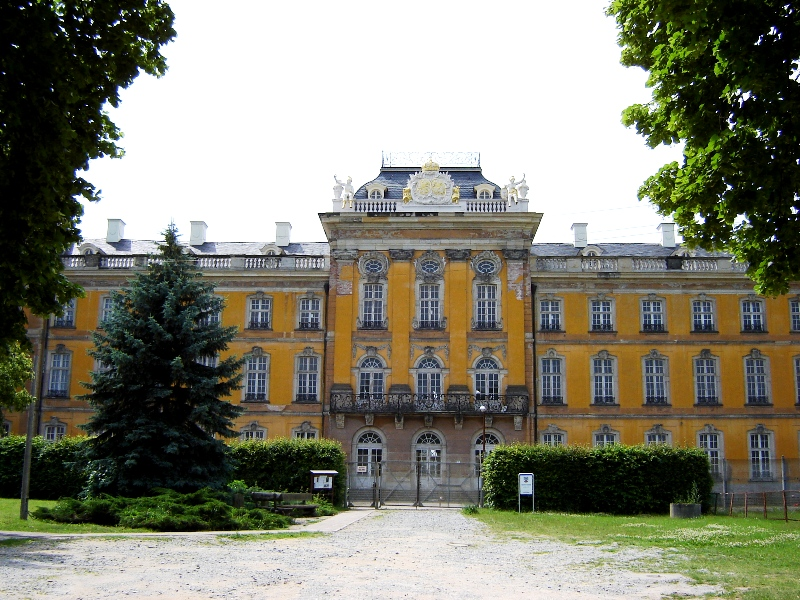
Dornburg Palace

Charles, Prince of Anhalt-Zerbst, had a new castle built at Dornburg near Gommern from 1674, which he gave to his brother, John Louis I, Prince of Anhalt-Dornburg. It was inherited by the latter's second son, future Christian August, Prince of Anhalt-Zerbst. In 1747 he died and the castle burnt down in 1750. His widow, Johanna Elisabeth of Holstein-Gottorp, governed the principality of Anhalt-Zerbst for her son Frederick Augustus until 1752. She had the new castle at Dornburg built as her thirds from 1750, a lavish baroque palace prepared to host her brother, Adolf Frederick, King of Sweden, or her daughter Sophie Auguste Fredericka, who in 1743 had married the Russian crown prince Peter III, to become empress in 1762, better known as Catherine the Great. However, neither of them ever visited, and the dowager princess and her son were forced into exile when Prussian forces invaded Anhalt-Zerbst during the Seven Years' War in 1758. Frederick the Great, who had actually proposed the Russian marriage, accused the princess and her son to support Russia, then his war enemy. Johanna Elisabeth died in Paris in 1760 and her son, Frederick Augustus, never returned to Zerbst and continued to live in Basel and Luxemburg. Upon his death in 1793, the Principality of Anhalt-Zerbst came to an end.

Nowadays the palace is in critical condition due to a lack of renovation. In 2018, it was sold to an investor from Berlin, who plans to use it as an academy.

== Notable people ==
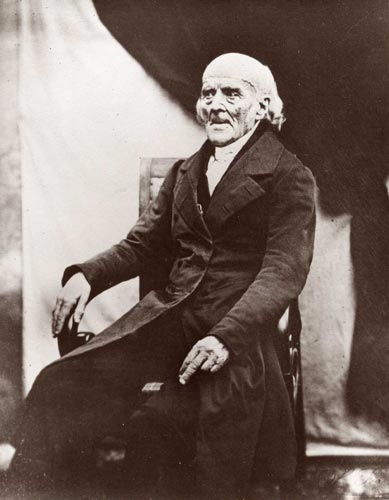
Samuel Hahnemann, 1841

- Samuel Hahnemann (1755-1843), physician and founder of homeopathy, from 1782 to 1785 physics in the office Gommern
- Otto Theodor Alfred Hensel (1889-1966), honorary citizen, mayor of Gommern 1945-1955

== Gallery ==
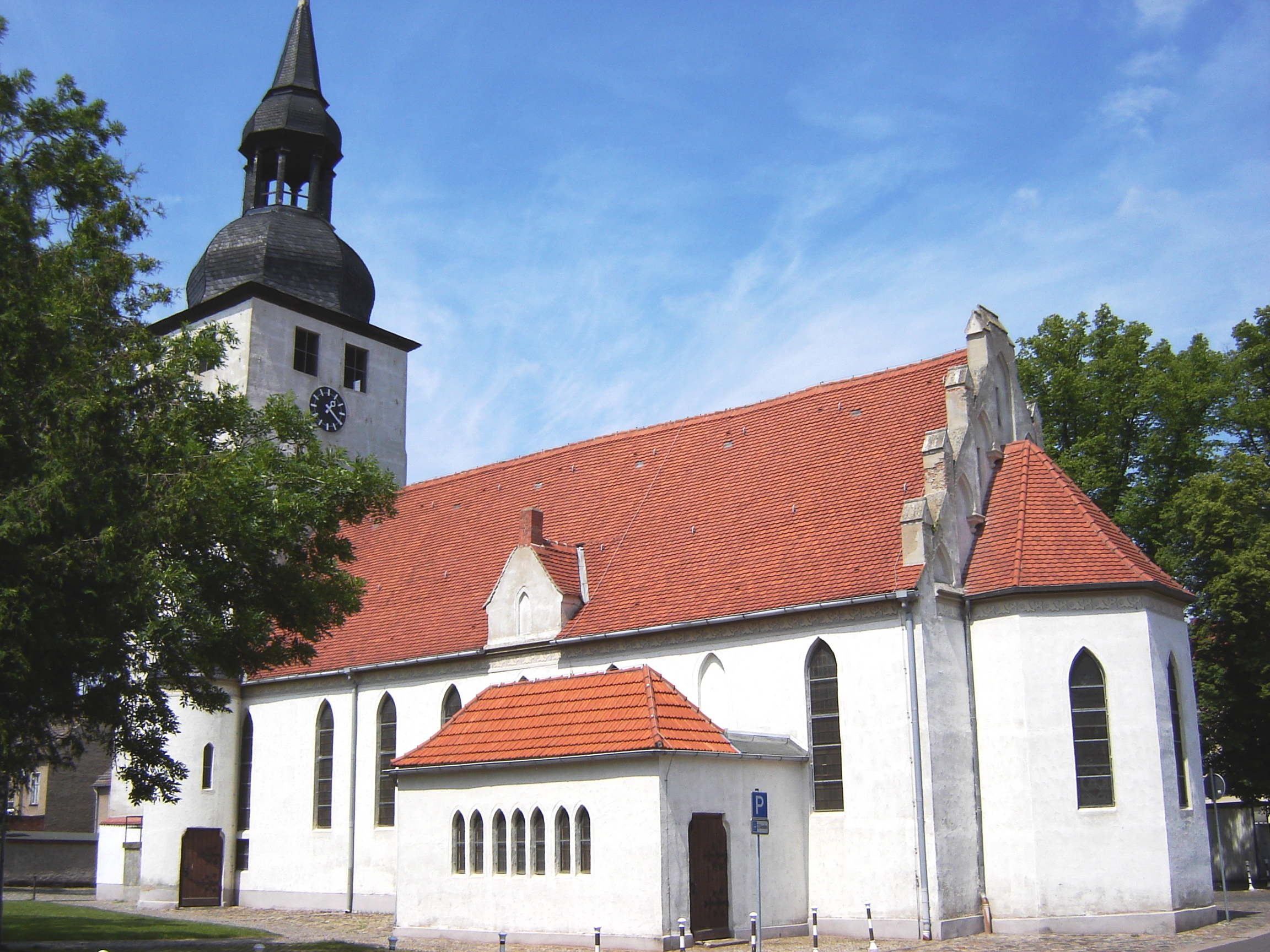
Lutheran Church of the Holy Trinity

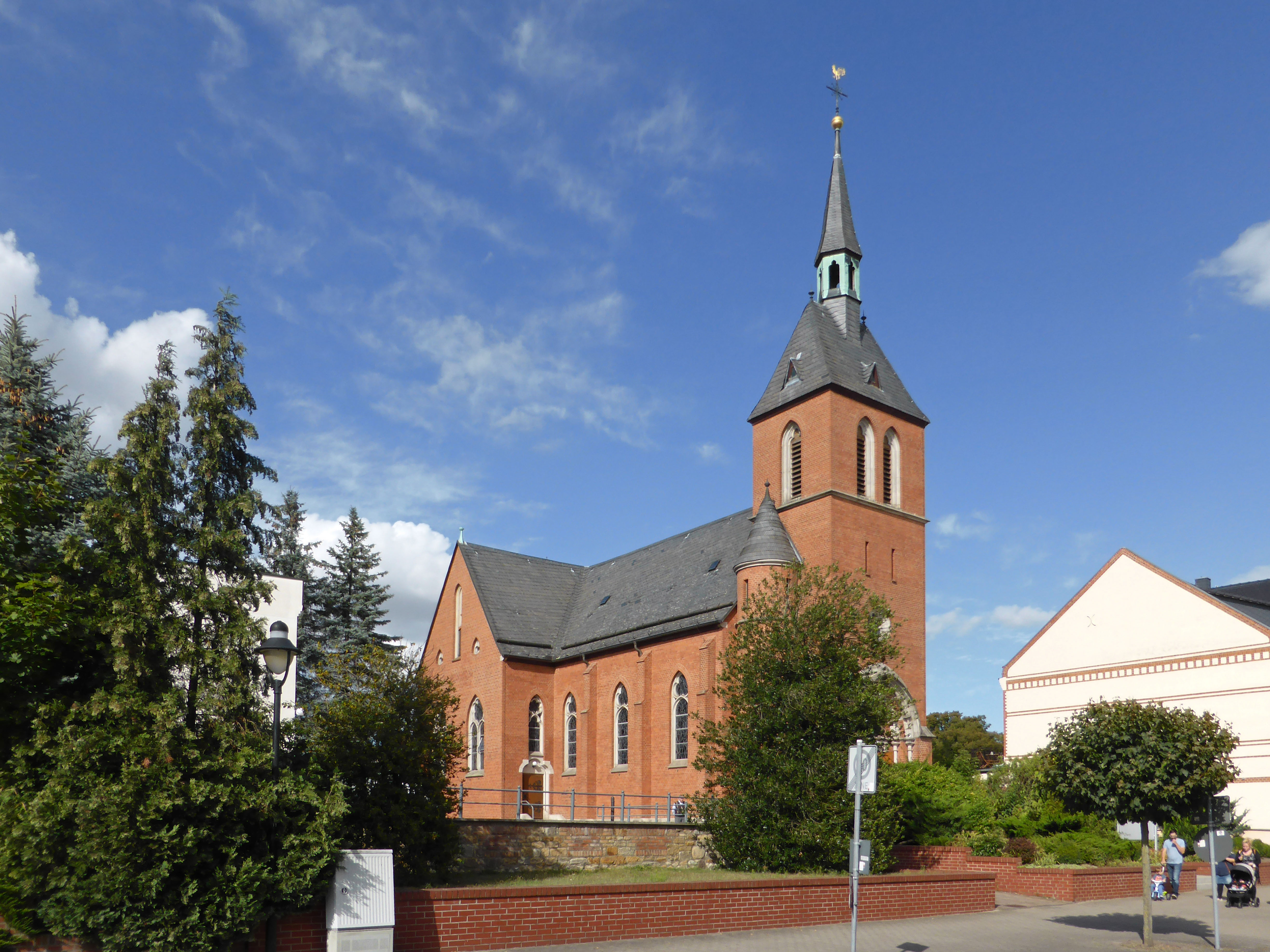
Catholic Church of the Sacred Heart of Jesus

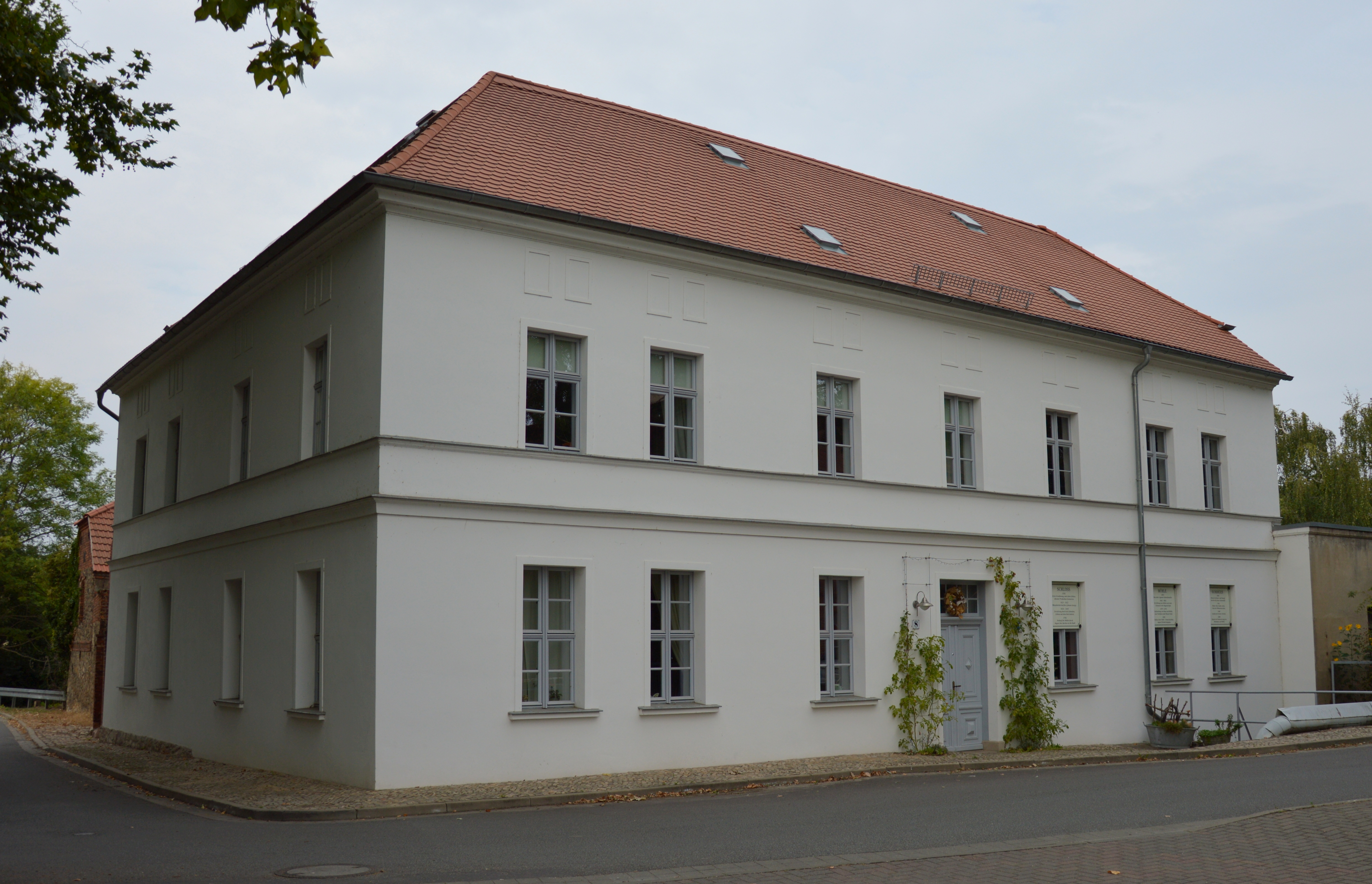
Castle mill

Leitzkau Castle
