= Trams in Magdeburg =

Coordinates: 52°07′56″N 11°38′13″E

Magdeburg tramway network
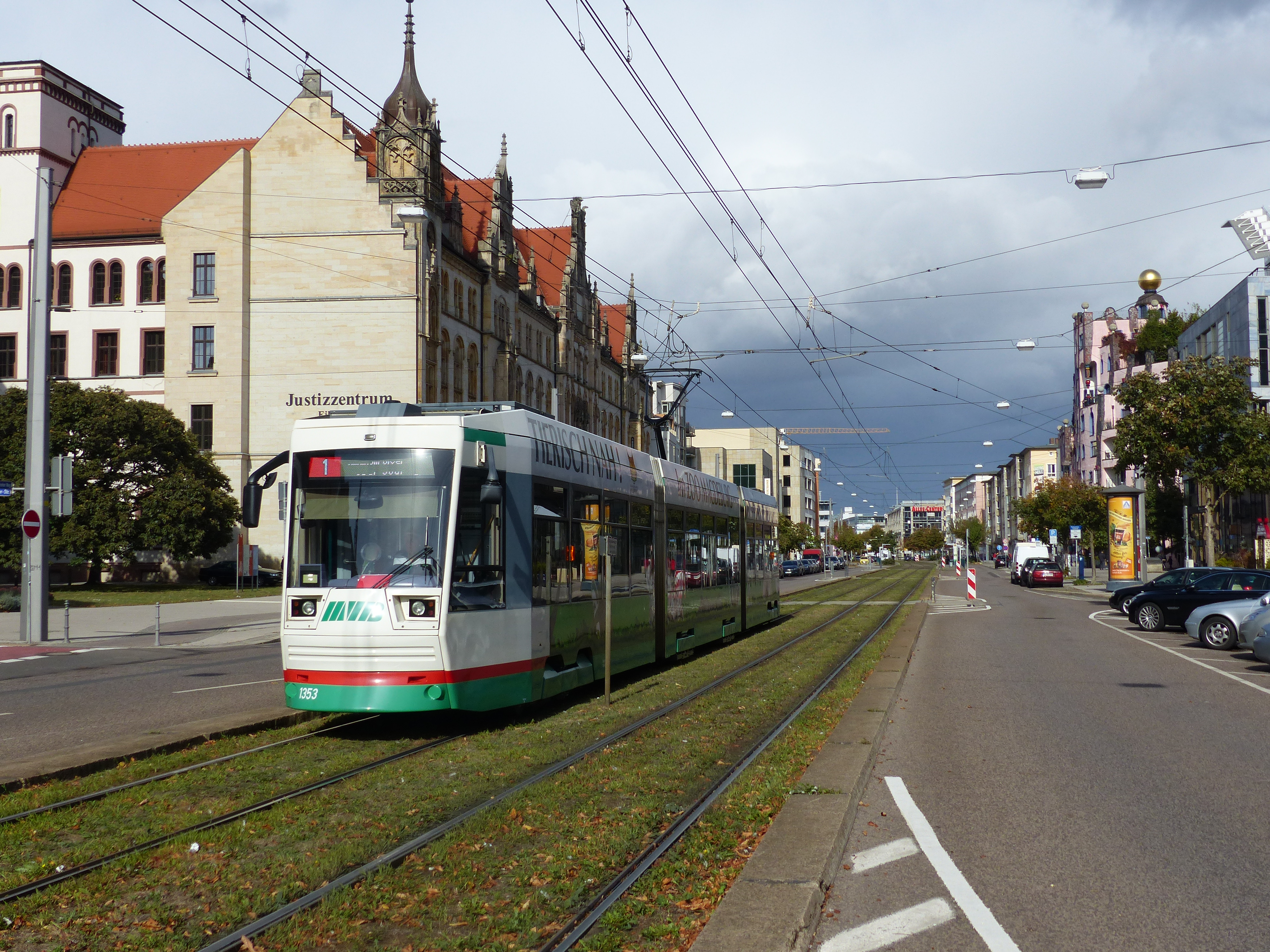
- Magdeburg tram in October 2018

Operation
- Locale: Magdeburg, Saxony-Anhalt, Germany

Statistics
Horsecar era: 1877–ca. 1899
- Status: Converted to electricity
- Track gauge: 1,435 mm (4 ft 8 1/2 in)
- Propulsion system: Horses
Electric tram era: since 1899
- Status: Operational
- Lines: 10 + 2 (at night)
- Operator: Magdeburger Verkehrsbetriebe (MVB)
- Track gauge: 1,435 mm (4 ft 8 1/2 in)
- Propulsion system: Electricity
- Electrification: 600 V DC
- Depot: 2
- Stock: NGT8D, KT4Dmod, T6A2/B6A2
- Route length: 64.0 km (39.8 mi)
- Magdeburg tramway network in 2021
- Website: Magdeburger Verkehrsbetriebe (in German)

The Magdeburg tramway network (German: Straßenbahnnetz Magdeburg) is a network of tramways forming part of the public transport system in Magdeburg, the capital city of the federal state of Saxony-Anhalt, Germany.

Opened in 1877, the network has been operated since 1999 by Magdeburger Verkehrsbetriebe (MVB), and is integrated in the Magdeburger Regionalverkehrsverbund (marego).

== Rolling stock ==
The fleet of the Magdeburg tram network consists of 83 LHB low-floor trams, 8 Tatra KT4Dmod trams, 4 Tatra T6A2M trams and 13 B6A2M trailers. An order for 35 new Flexity trams was announced in 2021. The new trams, designated NGT 10 D will be 38 m long with space for 241 passengers and the first vehicle was delivered to Magdeburg in September 2024.

For assistance in case of a derailment, for rerailing and for hauling defective trams, the MVB uses a modified Unimog road–rail vehicle with a lengthened wheelbase of 4,500mm and a power output of 240 PS.

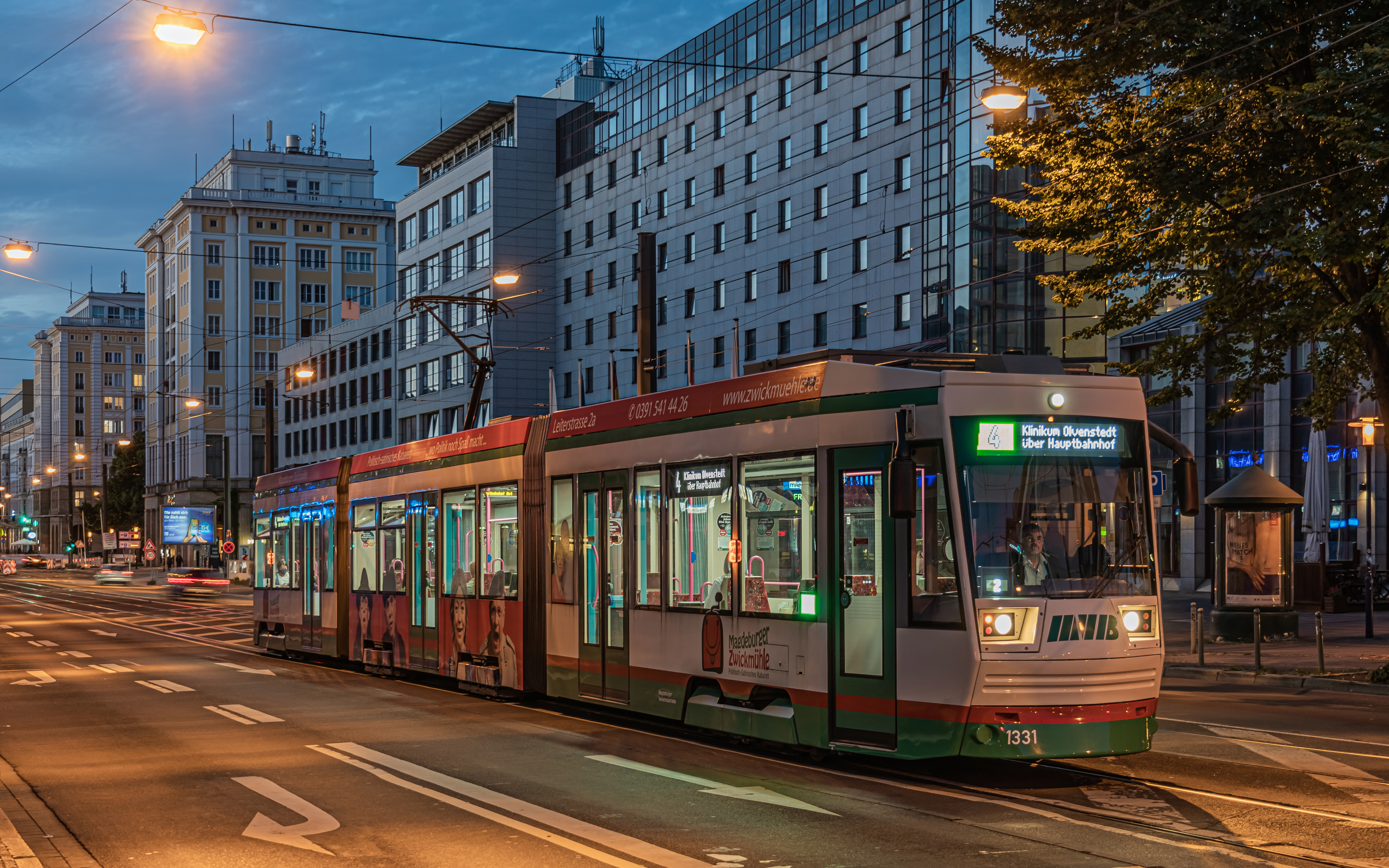
Low-floor tram

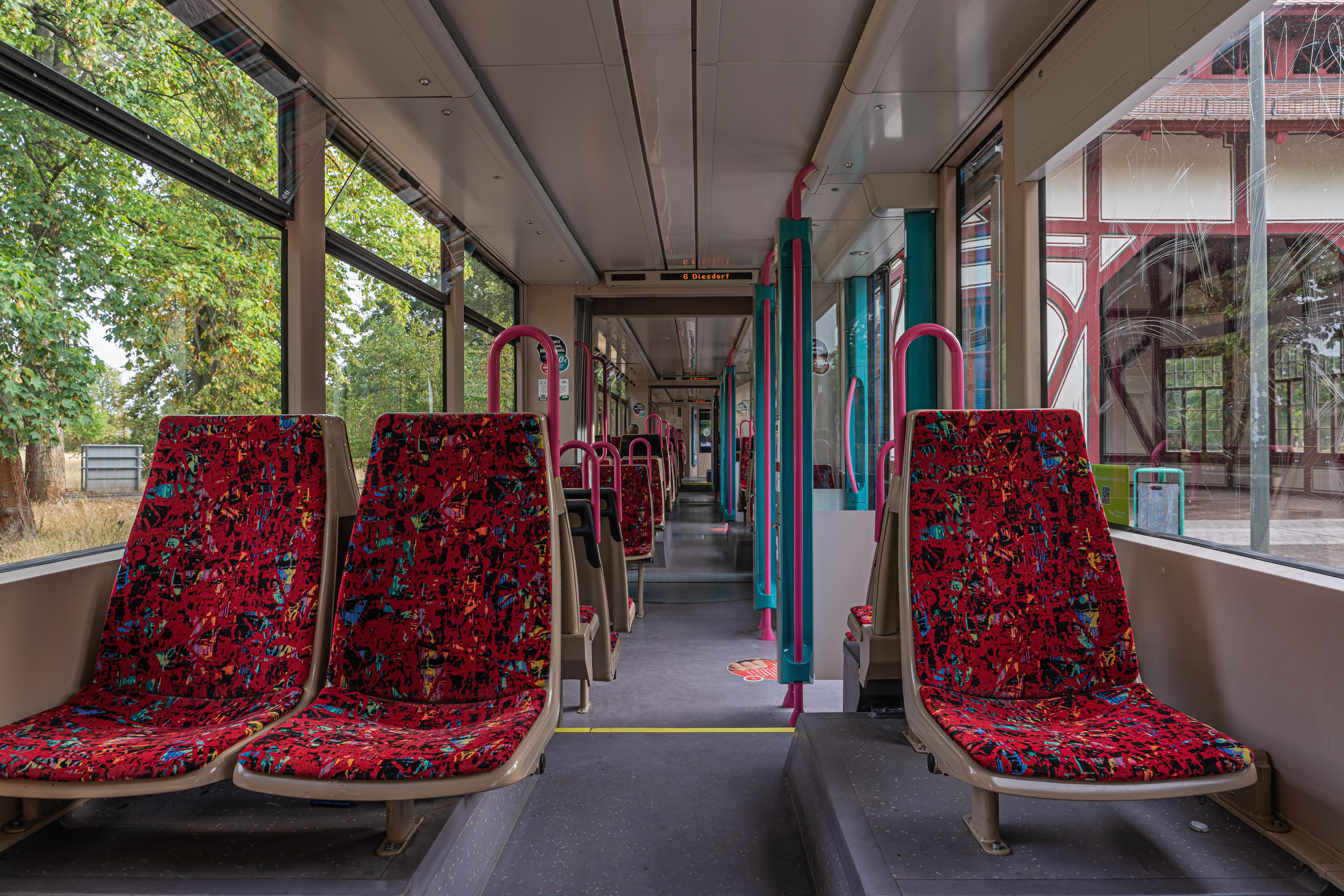
Low-floor tram interior

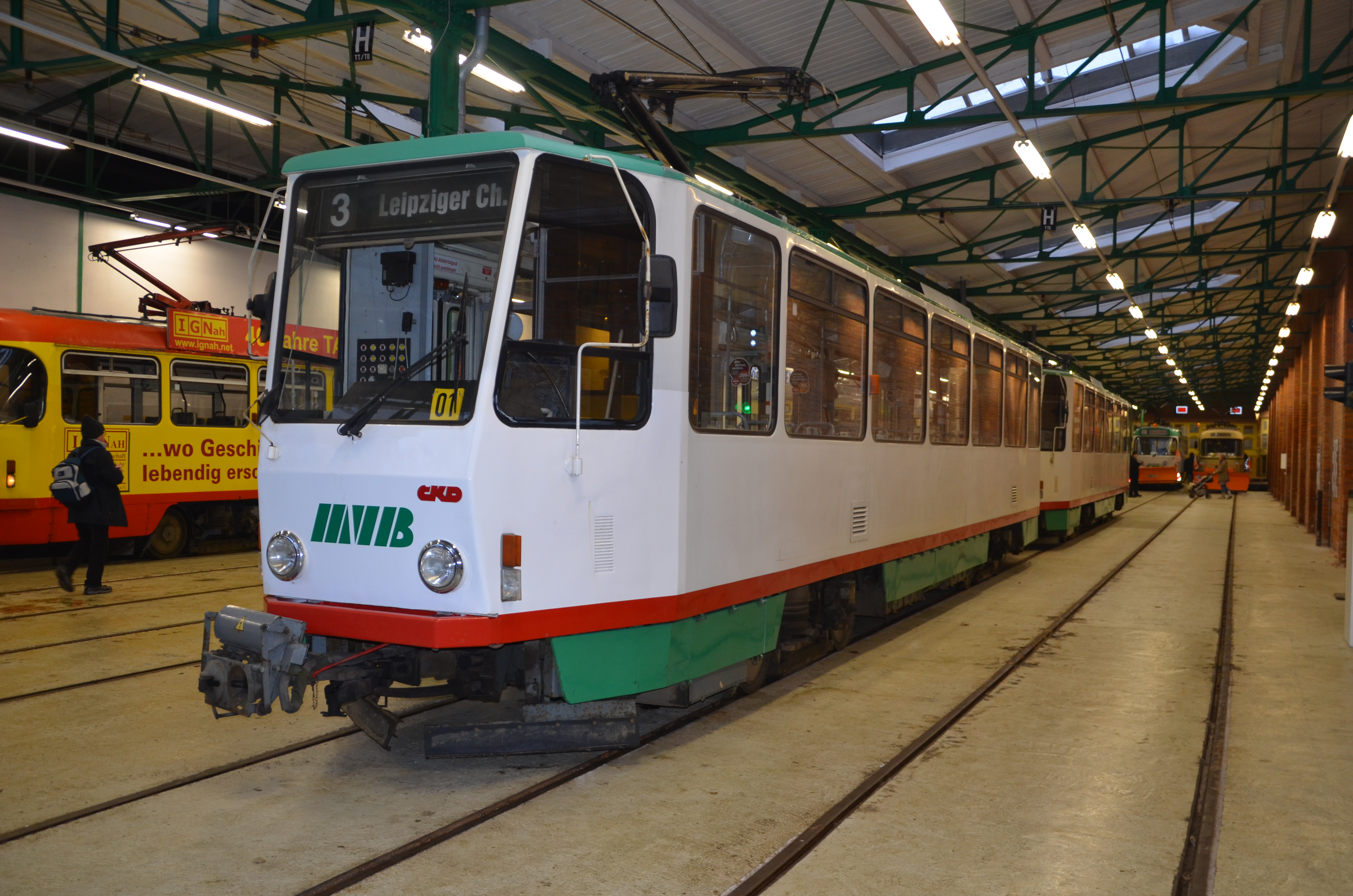
Tatra tram

== See also ==
- List of town tramway systems in Germany
- Trams in Germany
