= Oebisfelde station =

Railway station in Oebisfelde-Weferlingen, Germany

Oebisfelde
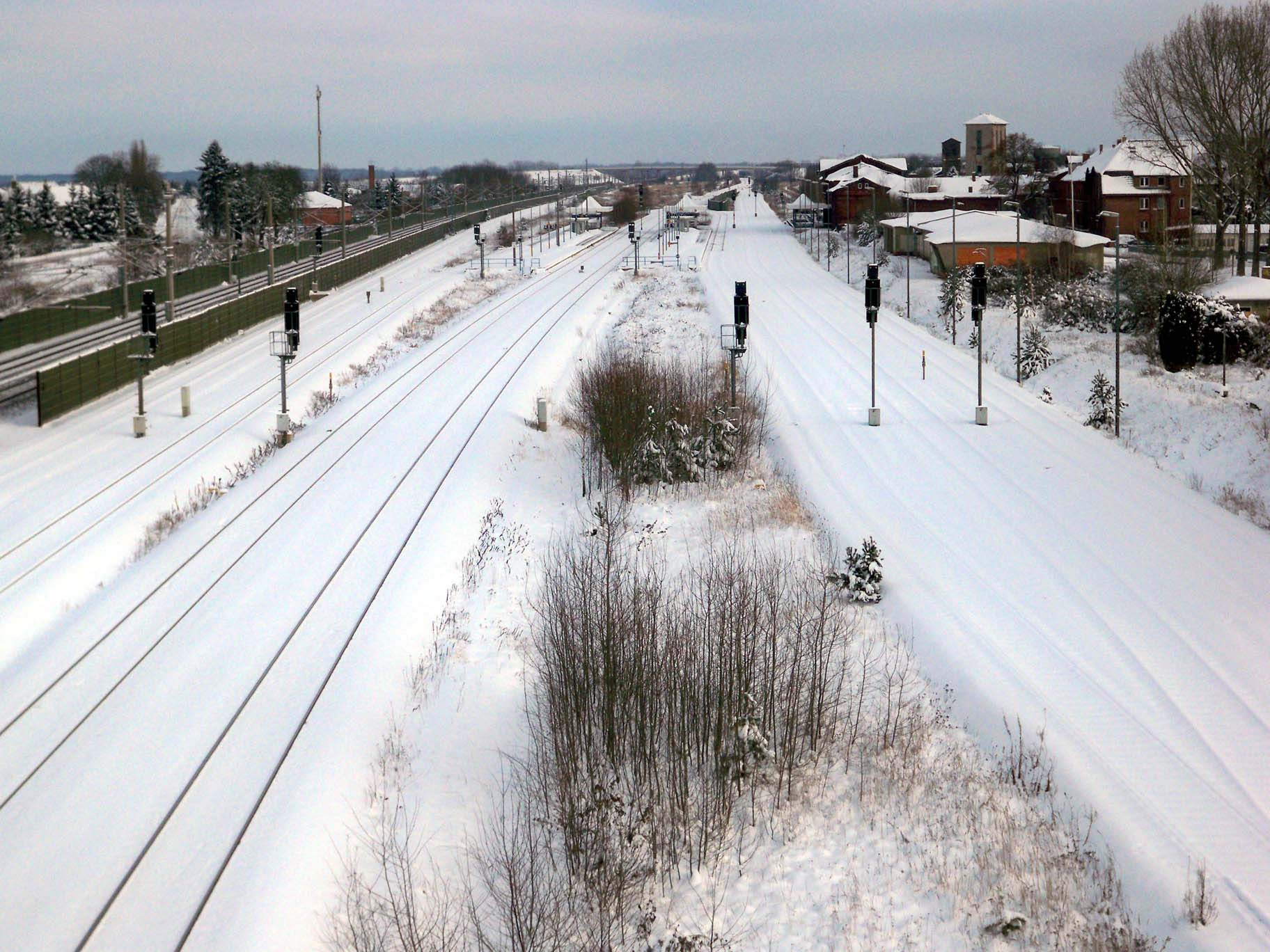
- Oebisfelde station in winter

General information
- Location: Am Bahnhof 7, Oebisfelde, Saxony-Anhalt; Germany
- Coordinates: 52°26′21″N 10°59′02″E
- Lines: Berlin–Lehrte (KBS 301); Oebisfelde–Magdeburg (KBS 308); former Oebisfelde–Salzwedel; former Helmstedt–Oebisfelde; former Schandelah–Oebisfelde; former Wittingen–Oebisfelde
- Platforms: 2
- Tracks: 4

Construction
- Accessible: No

Other information
- Station code: 4727
- DS100 code: LOE
- IBNR: 8010261
- Category: 5
- Fare zone: marego: 330
- Website: www.bahnhof.de

Services
Preceding station	Abellio Rail Mitteldeutschland	Following station
Wolfsburg Hbf Terminus	RE 6	Rätzlingen towards Magdeburg Hbf
Wolfsburg Hbf Terminus	RB 35	Miesterhorst towards Stendal Hbf
Wolfsburg Hbf Terminus	RB 36	Bösdorf towards Magdeburg Hbf
Location
- Location within Saxony-Anhalt Location within Germany Location within Europe

Oebisfelde (German: Bahnhof Oebisfelde) is a railway station located in Oebisfelde, Germany. The station opened in 1871 and is located on the Berlin-Lehrte Railway. The train services are operated by Abellio Rail Mitteldeutschland.

The station was a border station during the time of the Iron Curtain, until 1990.

== History ==
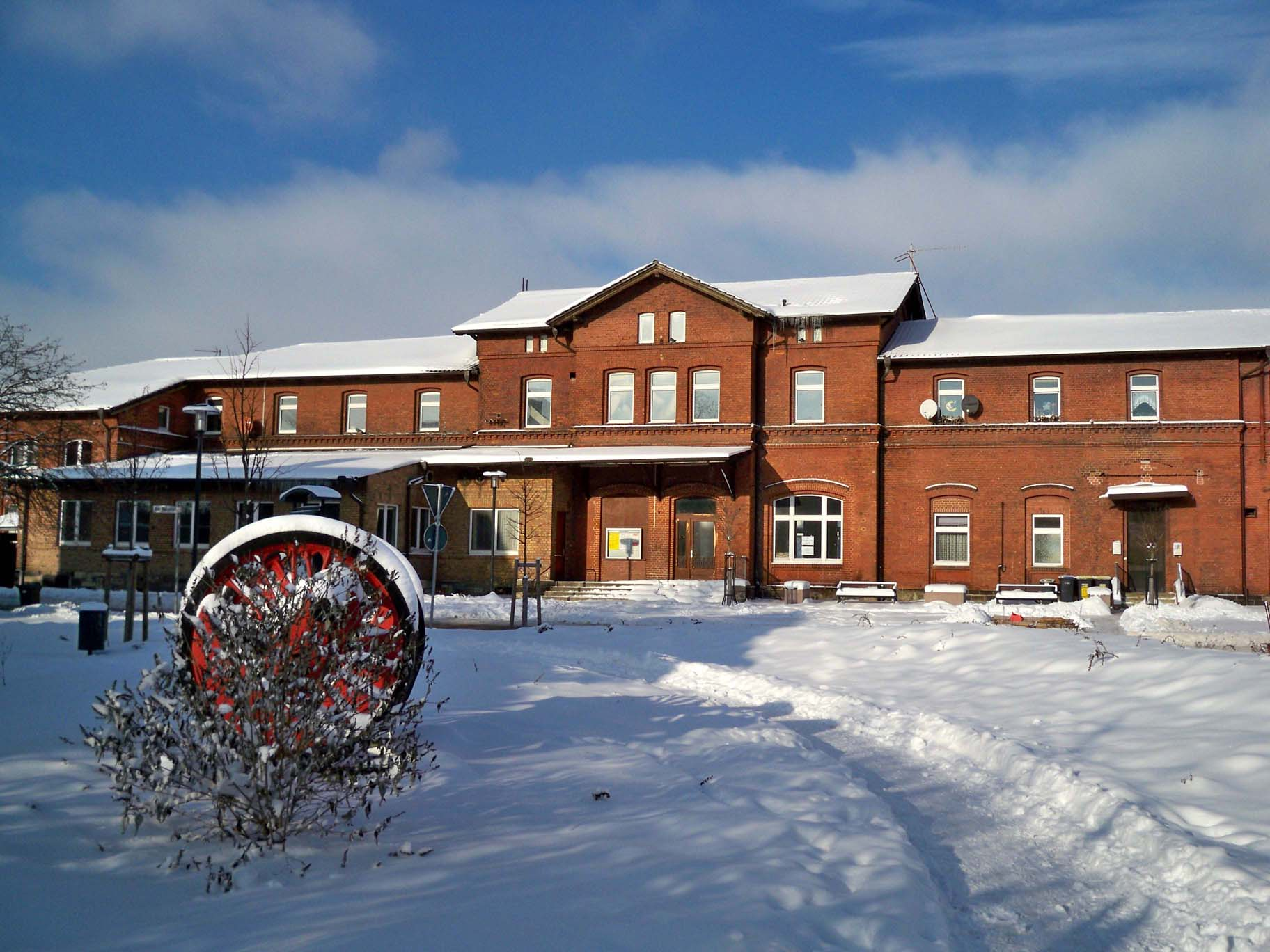
Entrance hall of Oebisfelde station, in the foreground is the axle of a steam locomotive

The station was opened in 1871 at a location that was then on the northern edge of the town of Oebisfelde during the construction of the Berlin–Lehrte railway, which connected Berlin with Hanover. The line was first used for freight transport on 1 November 1871 and it was opened for passenger transport a month later. Subsequently Oebisfelde was connected by railway lines to several other places. In 1874, the Magdeburg-Neuhaldensleben railway was extended to Oebisfelde. The line to Salzwedel was opened in 1889. The Helmstedt–Oebisfelde railway went into operation six years later. At the beginning of the 20th century lines were opened to Schandelah east of Brunswick (1902) and Wittingen (1909), the latter as a standard-gauge Kleinbahn with its own station directly north of Oebisfelde station.

After 1880, Oebisfelde became the location of a railway workshop, which developed into a locomotive depot (Bahnbetriebswerk). The number of trains that stopped at Oebisfelde station rose continuously: 15 trains stopped each day in 1888; this rose to 53 trains in 1912. The population of Oebisfelde increases substantially and the railway was the town’s main employer. An overpass was built at the western end of the station in 1910 because of the dense rail traffic. In 1918, the station was called Oebisfelde-Kaltendorf for several years following the unification of these two municipalities.

The depot immediately to the east of the station was rebuilt in 1921. 199 daily trains ran through Oebisfelde in 1934.

In the last years of the Second World War, the station was hit by several bombs, with freight trains being targeted in particular.

=== After the Second World War ===
With the establishment of the Inner German border just to the west of Oebisfelde, operations to Wittingen were stopped in August 1945. The light railway station at Oebisfelde was renamed Oebisfelde-Nord and it was now only used for freight traffic. Traffic towards Helmstedt ended as the line was cut three times by the Inner German border. The line between Helmstedt and Oebisfelde was, however, still used by Deutsche Reichsbahn and Deutsche Bundesbahn until 1952. Eventually all traffic towards Schandelah was abandoned. This line was rerouted through West German territory so that trains ran further west to Vorsfelde, where they could reverse to run to the east to reach Oebisfelde.

Railway connections to West Germany resumed on 8 December 1945. Oebisfelde thus became a border station. The corresponding station on the western side was at Wolfsburg. During the Berlin Blockade, cross-border traffic in Oebisfelde came to a halt from 24 June to 9 September 1948. In 1952, a five kilometre-wide exclusion zone was established at the inner German border to prevent the escape of citizens from East Germany (GDR). Oebisfelde station was in this zone. In the same year, the southernmost track of the station, track 1 was moved away from the other tracks so that passenger services to/from West Germany could be handled there. Track 2, which was to the north of track 1, had no platform. The border crossing facilities were located immediately south of track 1 and west of the station building . On 15 July 1954, an interzone train (interzonenzug, a train between East and West Germany) ran for the first time on the Hanover–Oebisfelde–Magdeburg route. The change from Deutsche Reichsbahn locomotives to Deutsche Bundesbahn locomotives always occurred in Oebisfelde. Therefore, many powerful steam locomotives were also stationed in the locomotive depot and similarly diesel locomotives were stationed there from 1968.

Interzone trains passed through Oebisfelde, but no transit trains (Transitzüge, trains running between West Berlin and West Germany without stopping in East Germany) passed through Oebisfelde. Transit trains on the Hanover–Berlin route ran via the more southerly border crossing between Helmstedt and Marienborn on the Brunswick–Magdeburg railway (near the Helmstedt–Marienborn road border crossing). A typical route of an interzone train passing through Oebisfelde was the Cologne–Leipzig route. In 1959, two interzone trains ran daily, with three in the summer.

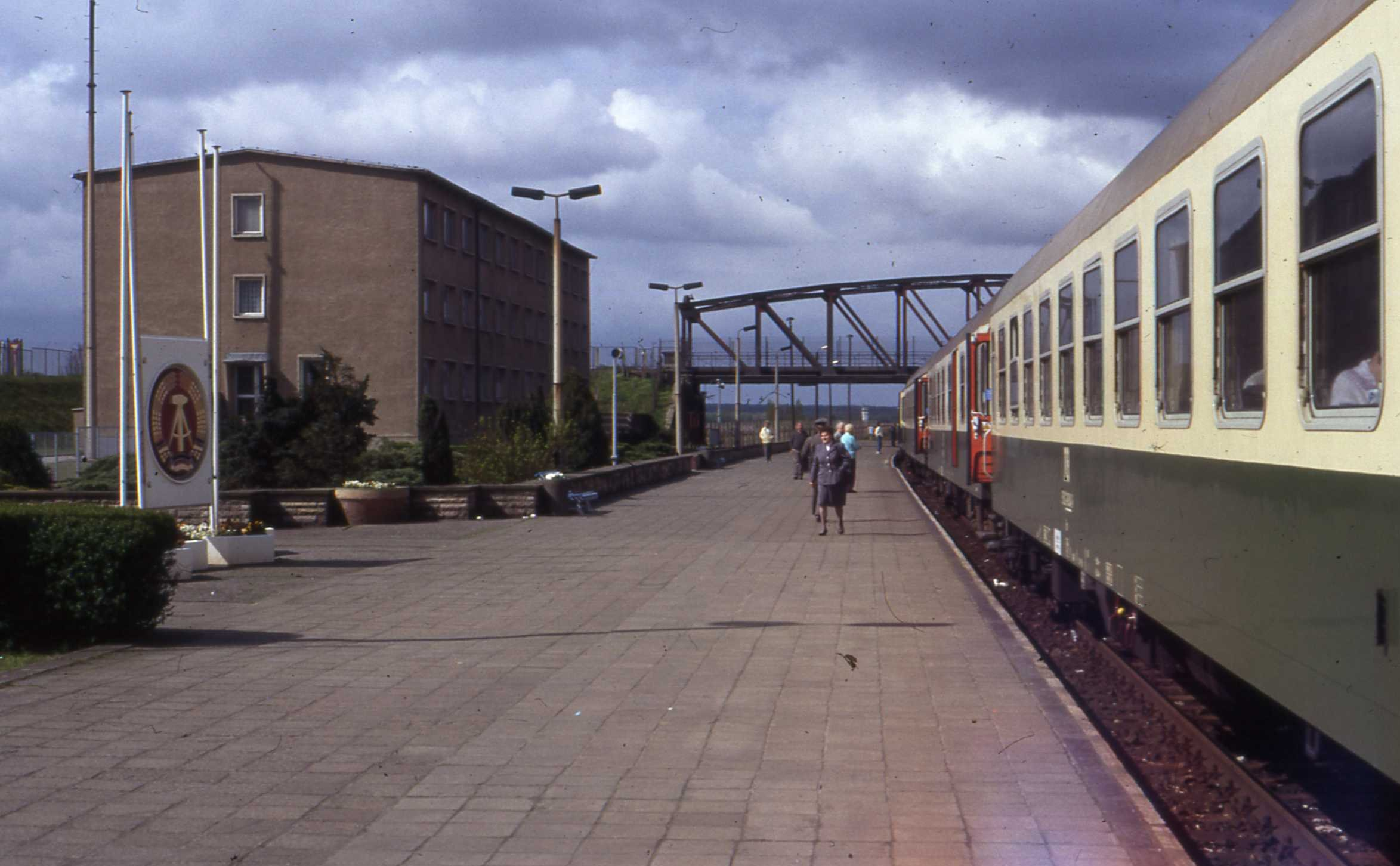
Platform on track 1; to the left is the barracks for members of the border troops (April 1990)

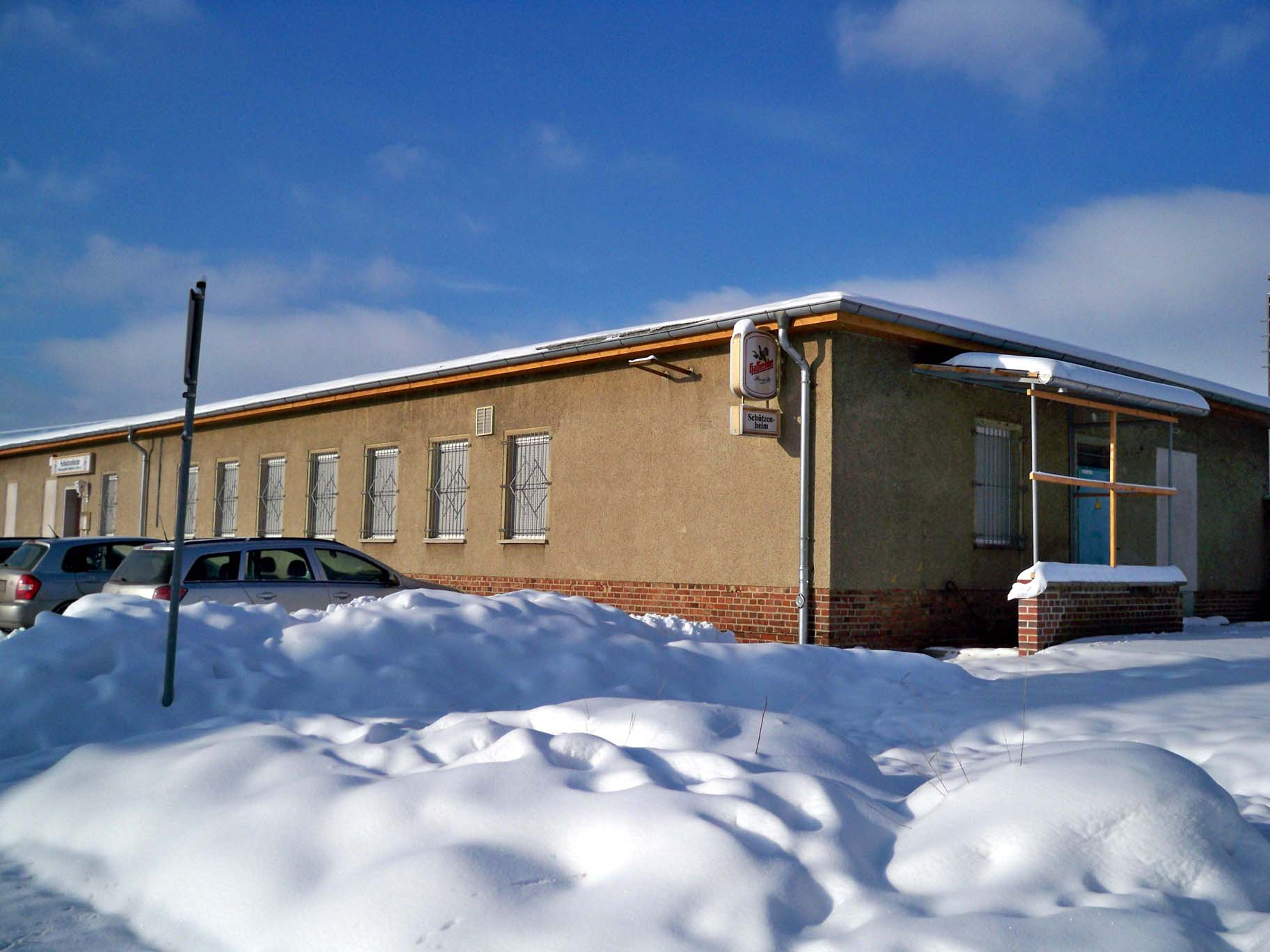
Former customs clearance building with barred windows

A border fence was built on the overpass at the western end of the station in 1960. In addition to the platform on track 1, there were three platforms with tracks for use within the GDR as well as the more northerly track 11 for freight trains to be dispatched to and from West Germany. This track was secured to the west by a catch point. Only when the person in charge of the Border Troops gave the order could the catch point be set to allow exit to West Germany. Even from the west there were catch points. Moreover, running through the station without stopping was technically impossible.

In 1975, four pairs of interzone trains ran via Oebisfelde, in the summer five. In addition, there were nine pairs of trains in passenger trains to/from Stendal, ten pairs of trains to/from Haldensleben and six to seven pairs of trains to/from Salzwedel.

Steam trains operated until 1988. Immediately west of the station there was a collision between an express train and a tank car on 27 July 1991. There were three deaths; it took several years to clear the site.

In the timetable for 1991/92, Oebisfelde was still served by numerous long-distance trains. Among them were Durchgangszug (express trains) from Cologne to Görlitz and Dresden as well as trains from Schiphol to Berlin. Only a pair of night trains running between Cologne and Moscow went through the station without stopping. The InterRegio service between Cologne and Leipzig also ran until the mid-1990s through Oebisfelde. The Oebisfelde depot lost its independence to 16 February 1995 and became part of the Stendal traction depot.

During the construction of the Hanover–Berlin high-speed railway, Oebisfelde station was completely redesigned. This meant, among other things, the end of long-distance passenger operations at the station. By 1998, the number of usable passenger platforms had declined to two island platforms. The platform canopies on platform 1 were removed. North and south of the four tracks serving the platforms, there were three more tracks, which are mostly used by freight trains. The double-track, electrified high-speed line was laid through the former northern part of the station and the only track connection to it is about 300 metres west of the station. Since then, only the third non-electrified track of the Berlin–Lehrte railway has run through the station. For the construction of high-speed railway, the northern exit of the line to Salzwedel had to be moved. For this purpose, approximately four kilometres of new railway line were built, but this line was closed in 2002. The supervisory staff was withdrawn in 1997. The station restaurant and the ticket office were closed at the turn of the millennium.

== Train services ==
The station is serves by the following service(s):

	Route	Frequency (min)
RE 6	Wolfsburg – Oebisfelde – Haldensleben – Magdeburg	Some trains
RB 35	Wolfsburg – Oebisfelde – Mieste – Gardelegen – Uchtspringe – Stendal	60 (Mon–Fri); 120 (Sat–Sun)
RB 36	Wolfsburg – Oebisfelde – Wegenstedt – Haldensleben – Barleben – Magdeburg	120
As of 12 December 2021
