= Schandelah station =

Railway station in Cremlingen, Germany

Schandelah
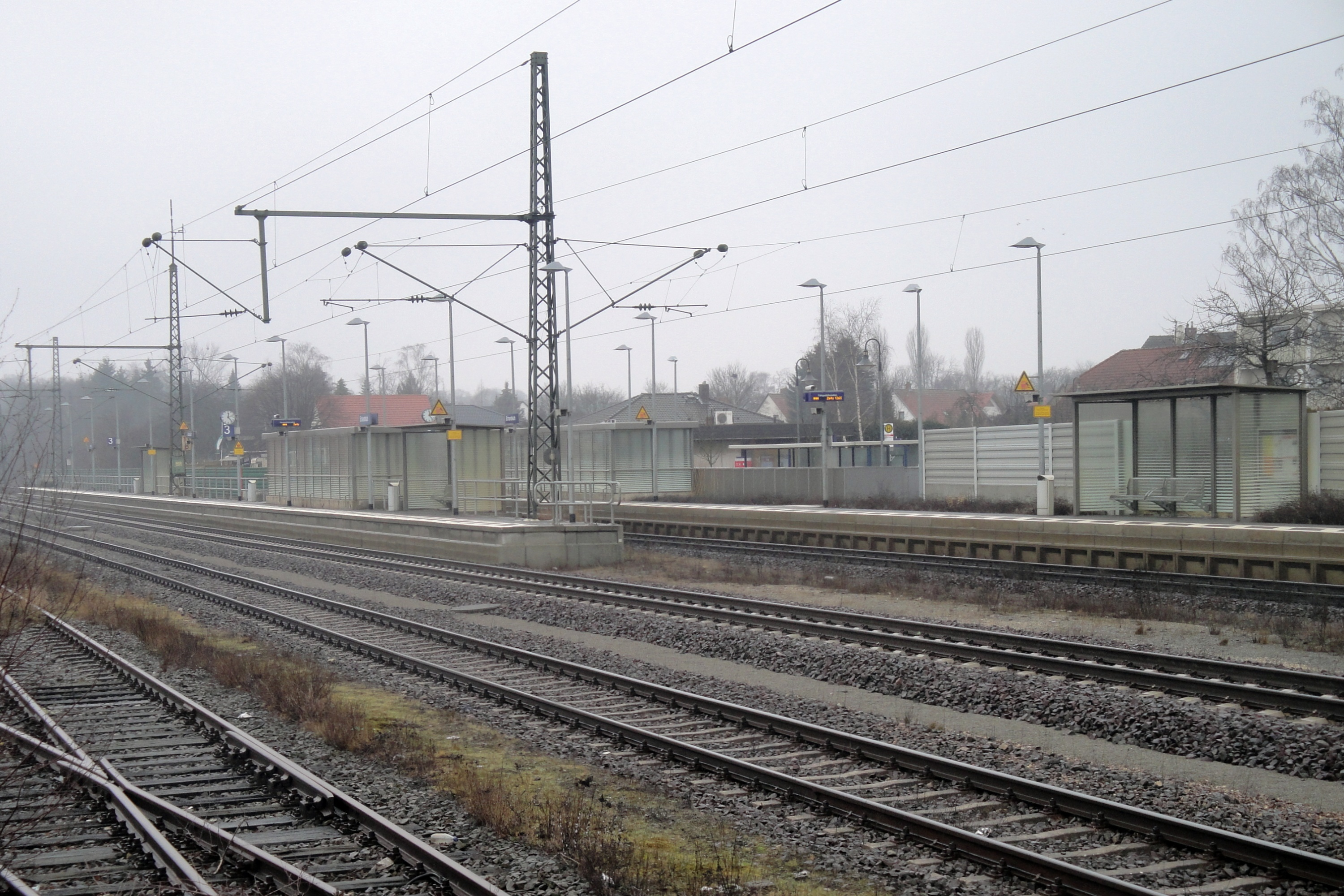
- Schandelah station

General information
- Location: Schandelah, Lower Saxony; Germany
- Coordinates: 52.1602°N 10.4109°E
- Owner: DB Netz
- Operator: DB Station&Service
- Line: Brunswick–Magdeburg railway
- Platforms: 3

Other information
- Station code: 5540
- Category: 6
- Fare zone: VRB: 71
- Website: www.bahnhof.de

Services
Preceding station	DB Regio Südost	Following station
Weddel towards Braunschweig Hbf	RB 40	Königslutter towards Burg (bei Magdeburg)
Location
- Location within Lower Saxony

Schandelah (German: Bahnhof Schandelah) is a railway station located in Schandelah, Germany. The station is located on the Brunswick–Magdeburg railway. The train services are operated by Deutsche Bahn.

== Train services ==
The following services currently call at the station:

- Local services RB 40 Braunschweig - Helmstedt - Magdeburg - Burg
