= Marienborn station =

Railway station in Germany

Marienborn
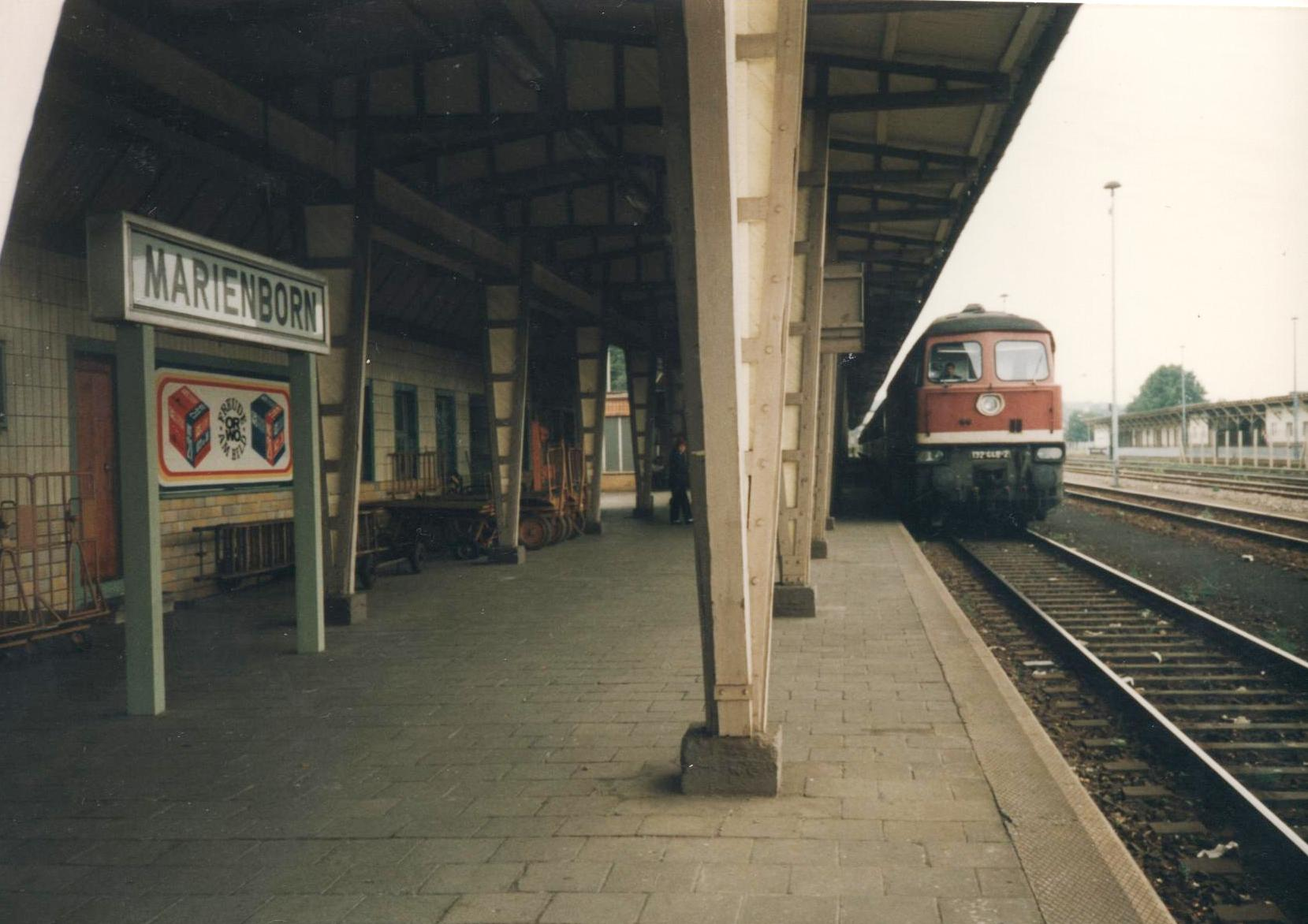
- 1990

General information
- Location: Hauptstraße 21; 39365 Marienborn; Saxony-Anhalt; Germany
- Coordinates: 52.1999°N 11.1190°E
- Elevation: 156 m (512 ft)
- System: Bf
- Owner: Deutsche Bahn
- Operator: DB Station&Service
- Lines: Brunswick–Magdeburg railway (KBS 310); Marienborn-Beendorfer Light Railway; Harbke–Völpke railway
- Platforms: 2 side platforms
- Tracks: 4
- Train operators: DB Regio Südost
- Connections: RB 40; 639 658 661

Construction
- Parking: yes
- Cycle facilities: no
- Accessible: yes

Other information
- Station code: 3951
- DS100 code: LMBN
- IBNR: 8012302
- Category: 6
- Fare zone: marego: 373
- Website: www.bahnhof.de

History
- Opened: 15 September 1872; 153 years ago

Services
Preceding station	DB Regio Südost	Following station
Helmstedt towards Braunschweig Hbf	RB 40	Wefensleben towards Burg (bei Magdeburg)
Location
- Location within Saxony-Anhalt Location within Germany Location within Europe

Marienborn station (German: Bahnhof Marienborn) is a railway station in the municipality of Marienborn, located in the Börde district in Saxony-Anhalt, Germany.

== Notable places nearby ==
- Helmstedt–Marienborn border crossing

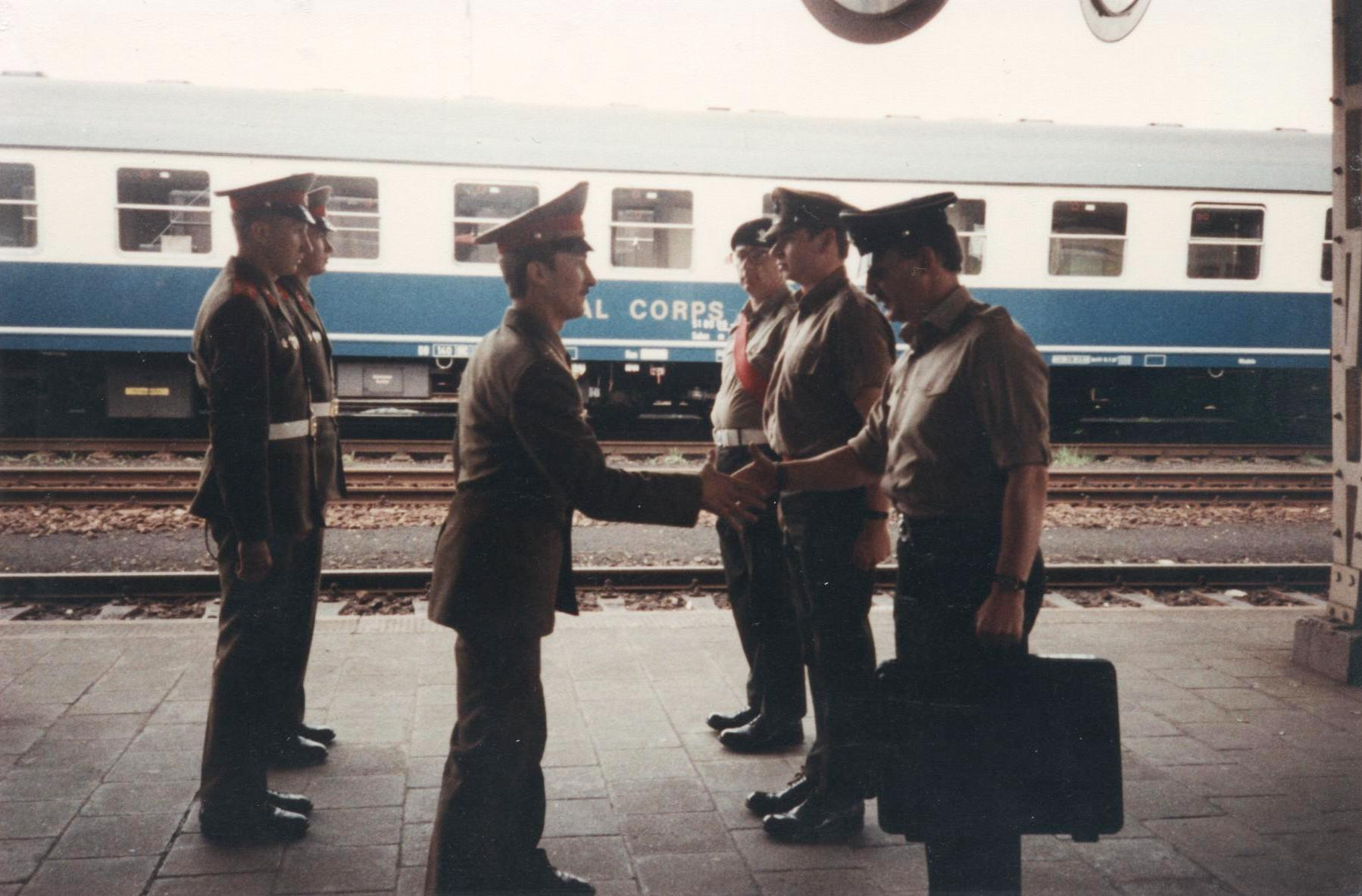
Border railway station Marienborn. Allied border clearance.
