= Königslutter station =

Railway station in Königslutter am Elm, Germany

Königslutter
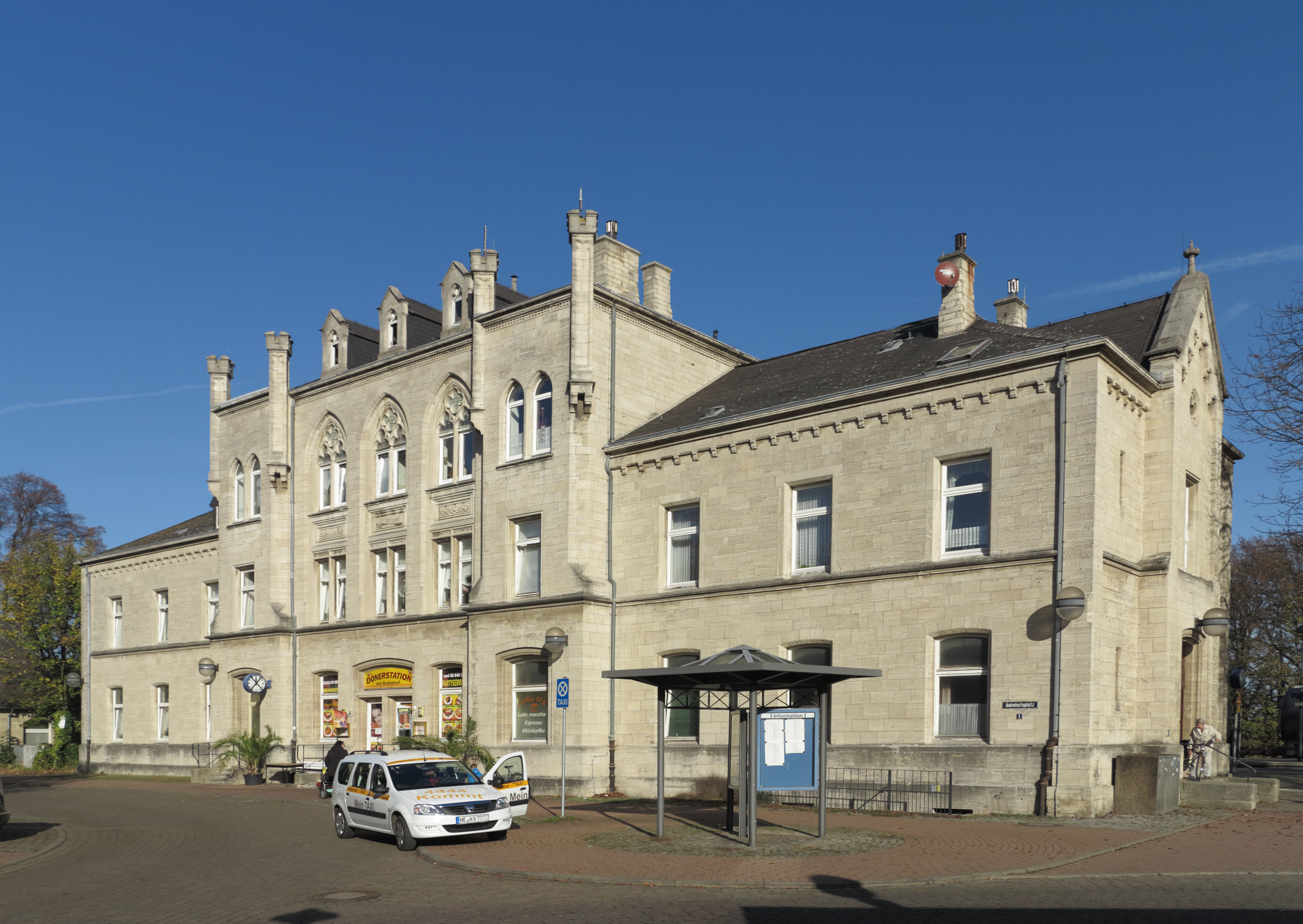
- Königslutter railway station

General information
- Location: Königslutter, Lower Saxony; Germany
- Coordinates: 52.1526°N 10.4844°E
- Owner: DB Netz
- Operator: DB Station&Service
- Line: Brunswick–Magdeburg railway
- Platforms: 3

Other information
- Station code: 3354
- Category: 4
- Fare zone: VRB: 35
- Website: www.bahnhof.de

Services
Preceding station	DB Regio Südost	Following station
Schandelah towards Braunschweig Hbf	RB 40	Frellstedt towards Burg (bei Magdeburg)
Location
- Location within Lower Saxony

Königslutter (German: Bahnhof Königslutter) is a railway station located in Königslutter, Germany. The station is located on the Brunswick–Magdeburg railway. The train services are operated by Deutsche Bahn.

== Train services ==
The following services currently call at the station:

- Local services RB 40 Braunschweig - Helmstedt - Magdeburg - Burg
