= Frellstedt station =

Railway station in Frellstedt, Germany

Frellstedt
- Frellstedt railway station

General information
- Location: Frellstedt, Lower Saxony; Germany
- Coordinates: 52.1248°N 10.5436°E
- System: Bf
- Owner: DB Netz
- Operator: DB Station&Service
- Line: Brunswick–Magdeburg railway
- Platforms: 2

Other information
- Station code: 1915
- Category: 6
- Fare zone: VRB: 31
- Website: www.bahnhof.de

Services
Preceding station	DB Regio Südost	Following station
Königslutter towards Braunschweig Hbf	RB 40	Helmstedt towards Burg (bei Magdeburg)
Location
- Location within Lower Saxony

Frellstedt (German: Bahnhof Frellstedt) is a railway station located in Frellstedt, Germany. The station is located on the Brunswick–Magdeburg railway. The train services are operated by Deutsche Bahn.

== Train services ==
The following services currently call at the station:

- Local services RB 40 Braunschweig - Helmstedt - Magdeburg - Burg
