= Gerwisch station =

Railway station in Germany

Gerwisch

General information
- Location: Ladestraße 1; 39175 Gerwisch; Saxony-Anhalt; Germany
- Coordinates: 52°10′38″N 11°44′31″E
- Owner: DB Netz
- Operator: DB Station&Service
- Lines: Berlin–Magdeburg railway (KBS 260)
- Platforms: 2 side platforms
- Tracks: 3
- Train operators: DB Regio Südost

Other information
- Station code: 2108
- DS100 code: LGWS
- IBNR: 8011630
- Category: 6
- Fare zone: marego: 415
- Website: www.bahnhof.de

Services
Preceding station	DB Regio Südost	Following station
Biederitz towards Braunschweig Hbf	RB 40	Möser towards Burg (bei Magdeburg)
Location
- Location within Saxony-Anhalt

Gerwisch station is a railway station in the municipality of Gerwisch, located in the Jerichower Land district in Saxony-Anhalt, Germany.
