= Dettum station =

Railway station in Dettum, Germany

Dettum

General information
- Location: Zuckerfabrik 5; 38173 Dettum; Lower Saxony; Germany
- Coordinates: 52°09′24″N 10°39′40″E
- Owner: DB Netz
- Operator: DB Station&Service
- Lines: Wolfenbüttel–Oschersleben railway (KBS 312)
- Platforms: 1 side platform
- Tracks: 1
- Train operators: DB Regio Nord

Other information
- Station code: 1184
- DS100 code: HDEM
- IBNR: 8001429
- Category: 7
- Fare zone: VRB: 72
- Website: www.bahnhof.de

Services
Preceding station	DB Regio Nord	Following station
Wolfenbüttel towards Braunschweig Hbf	RB 45	Schöppenstedt Terminus
Location
- Location within Lower Saxony

Dettum station is a railway station in the municipality of Dettum, located in the Wolfenbüttel district in Lower Saxony, Germany.
