= Weddel station =

Railway station in Cremlingen, Germany

Weddel (Braunschw)

General information
- Location: Weddel, Lower Saxony; Germany
- Coordinates: 52.1609°N 10.3726°E
- Owner: DB Netz
- Operator: DB Station&Service
- Lines: Brunswick–Magdeburg railway; Weddel loop
- Platforms: 2

Other information
- Station code: 6574
- Category: 6
- Fare zone: VRB: 71
- Website: www.bahnhof.de

Services
Preceding station	Metronom	Following station
Braunschweig Hbf towards Hildesheim Hbf	RE 50	Fallersleben towards Wolfsburg Hbf
Preceding station	DB Regio Südost	Following station
Braunschweig Hbf Terminus	RB 40	Schandelah towards Burg (bei Magdeburg)
Location
- Location within Lower Saxony

Weddel (German: Bahnhof Weddel) is a railway station located in Weddel, Germany. The station is located on the Brunswick–Magdeburg railway and Weddel loop. The train services are operated by Metronom and Deutsche Bahn.

== Train services ==
The station is served by the following services:

- Regional services RE 50 Hildesheim - Braunschweig - Wolfsburg
- Local services RB 40 Braunschweig - Helmstedt - Magdeburg - Burg
