= Wolfenbüttel station =

Railway station in Wolfenbüttel, Germany

Wolfenbüttel
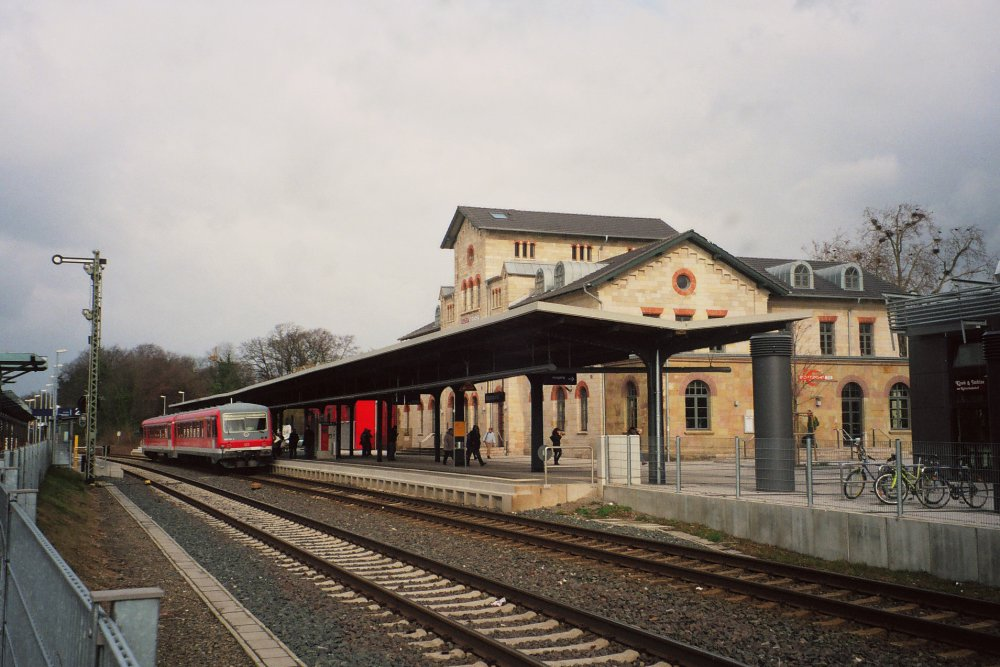
- 2008

General information
- Location: Bahnhof 1; 38300 Wolfenbüttel, Lower Saxony; Germany
- Coordinates: 52°09′32″N 10°31′55″E
- Owner: DB Netz
- Operator: DB Station&Service
- Lines: Brunswick–Bad Harzburg (KBS 353); Wolfenbüttel–Oschersleben (KBS 312); Groß Gleidingen–Wolfenbüttel
- Platforms: 2 side platforms
- Tracks: 2
- Train operators: DB Regio Nord erixx

Other information
- Station code: 6850
- DS100 code: HWOH
- IBNR: 8000255
- Category: 6
- Fare zone: VRB: 70
- Website: www.bahnhof.de

History
- Opened: 1 December 1838; 187 years ago

Services
Preceding station		Following station
Börßum towards Bad Harzburg	RB 42	Braunschweig Hbf Terminus
Börßum towards Goslar	RB 43	Braunschweig Hbf Terminus
Preceding station	DB Regio Nord	Following station
Braunschweig Hbf Terminus	RB 45	Dettum towards Schöppenstedt
Location
- Location within Lower Saxony

Wolfenbüttel station is a railway station in the municipality of Wolfenbüttel, located in the Wolfenbüttel district in Lower Saxony, Germany.
