= Möser station =

Railway station in Germany

Möser

General information
- Location: Am Bahnhof 1; 39291 Möser; Saxony-Anhalt; Germany
- Coordinates: 52°13′08″N 11°47′04″E
- Owner: DB Netz
- Operator: DB Station&Service
- Lines: Berlin–Magdeburg railway (KBS 260)
- Platforms: 2 side platforms
- Tracks: 3
- Train operators: DB Regio Südost

Other information
- Station code: 4187
- DS100 code: LMOS
- IBNR: 8012381
- Category: 6
- Fare zone: marego: 413
- Website: www.bahnhof.de

Services
Preceding station	DB Regio Südost	Following station
Gerwisch towards Braunschweig Hbf	RB 40	Burg (bei Magdeburg) Terminus
Location
- Location within Saxony-Anhalt

Möser station is a railway station in the municipality of Möser, located in the Jerichower Land district in Saxony-Anhalt, Germany.
