= Vahldorf station =

Railway station in Germany

Vahldorf

General information
- Location: Vahldorf, Saxony-Anhalt, Germany
- Coordinates: 52°15′07″N 11°30′01″E
- Line: Obeisfelde–Magdeburg
- Platforms: 1
- Tracks: 1

Other information
- Fare zone: marego: 318

Services
Preceding station	Abellio Rail Mitteldeutschland	Following station
Haldensleben towards Wolfsburg Hbf	RB 36	Groß Ammensleben towards Magdeburg Hbf
Location
- Location within Saxony-Anhalt

Vahldorf (German: Bahnhof Vahldorf) is a railway station in the village of Vahldorf, Saxony-Anhalt, Germany. The station lies on the Oebisfelde–Magdeburg railway and the train services are operated by Deutsche Bahn.

== Train services ==
The station is served by the following services:

- regional service RB 36 Wolfsburg - Oebisfelde - Haldensleben - Magdeburg
