= LHL =

LHL may refer to:

- Haldensleben station's DS100 code
- Lahul Lohar language's ISO 639-3 code
- London Hockey League, a men's field hockey league based in London and the South of England
- Abbreviation for Lee Hsien Loong
- Luxembourg Hockey League, a professional men's and women's ice hockey league based in Luxembourg.
