= Erkerode =

- Municipality
- Coat of arms

- Location of Erkerode within Wolfenbüttel district
- Interactive map of Erkerode
- Location within Germany Location within Lower Saxony
- Coordinates: 52°13′N 10°42′E
- Country: Germany
- State: Lower Saxony
- District: Wolfenbüttel
- Municipal assoc.: Sickte

Government
  - Mayor: Dr. Heinrich Füchtjohann (SPD)

Area
  - Total: 13.34 km^{2} (5.15 sq mi)
- Elevation: 60–180 m (200–590 ft)

Population (2025-12-31)
  - Total: 793
  - Density: 59.4/km^{2} (154/sq mi)
- Time zone: UTC+01:00 (CET)
  - Summer (DST): UTC+02:00 (CEST)
- Postal codes: 38173
- Dialling codes: 05305
- Vehicle registration: WF

Erkerode is a municipality in the District of Wolfenbüttel, in the south-east of Lower Saxony, Germany. It is nearly 16 kilometres (9.9 mi) south-east of Braunschweig. The Elm, a range of forested hills, is close by.

The town of Erkerode was first mentioned in historic documents in 1175 (Erikeroth). The village belonged to the noble family of Veltheim since the 12th century. It was part of the court of Destedt. There are still many medieval farm houses of various types to be seen in the village today.

== See also ==
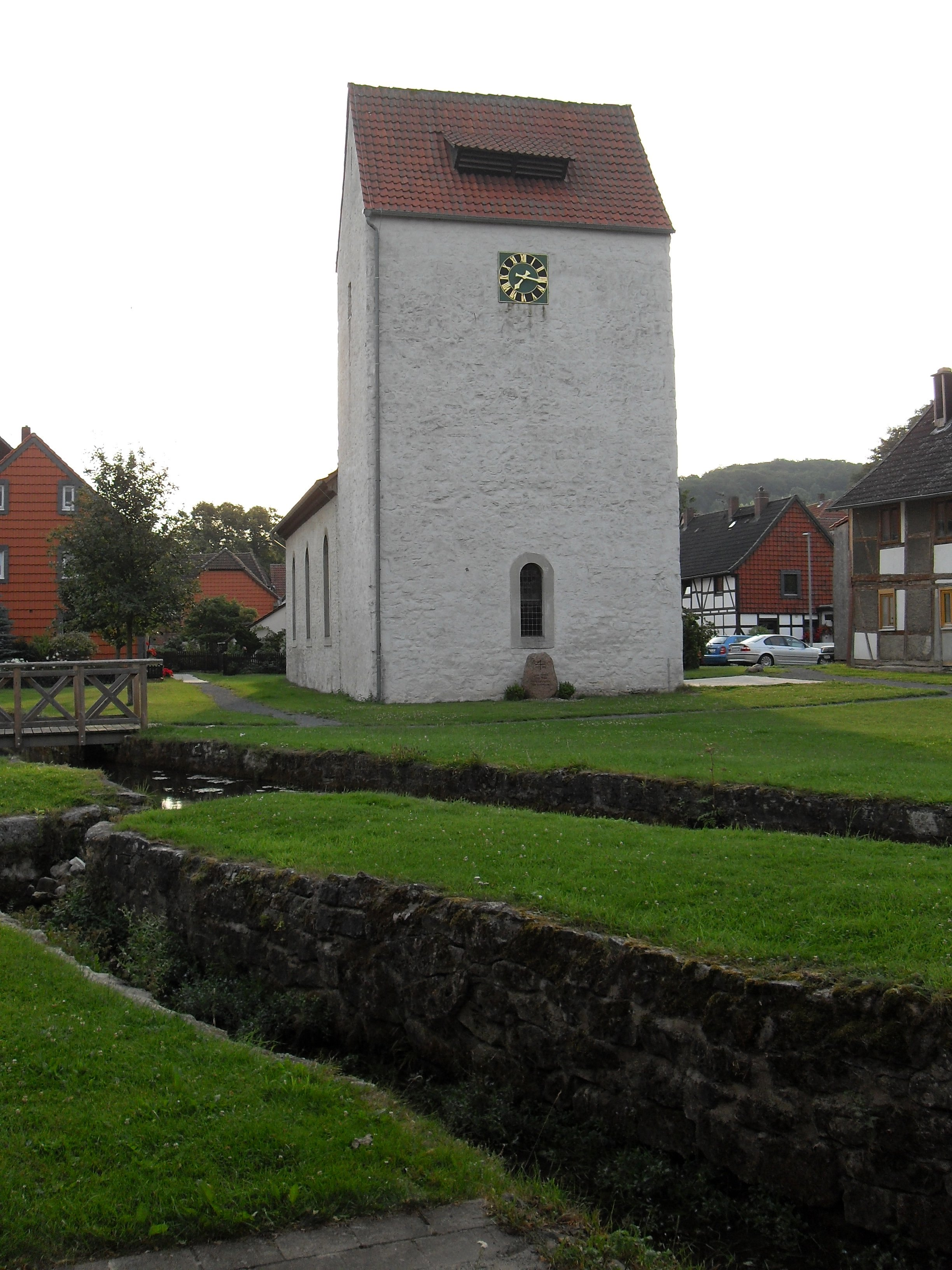
Protestant church in Erkerode
