= Sickte (Samtgemeinde) =

Municipality in Lower Saxony, Germany

- Samtgemeinde
- Location of Sickte within Wolfenbüttel district
- Interactive map of Sickte
- Location within Germany Location within Lower Saxony
- Coordinates: 52°13′N 10°38′E
- Country: Germany
- State: Lower Saxony
- District: Wolfenbüttel
- Seat: Sickte
- Subdivisions: 5 municipalities

Area
  - Total: 81.98 km^{2} (31.65 sq mi)

Population (2025-12-31)
  - Total: 10,142
  - Density: 123.7/km^{2} (320.4/sq mi)
- Time zone: UTC+01:00 (CET)
  - Summer (DST): UTC+02:00 (CEST)
- Website: www.sickte.de

Sickte is a Samtgemeinde ("collective municipality") in the district of Wolfenbüttel, in Lower Saxony, Germany. Its seat is in the village Sickte.

The Samtgemeinde Sickte consists of the following municipalities:

1. Dettum
2. Erkerode
3. Evessen
4. Sickte
5. Veltheim
