= Helmstedt station =

Railway station in Helmstedt, Germany

Coordinates: 52°13′19.8″N 11°00′37.7″E

Helmstedt
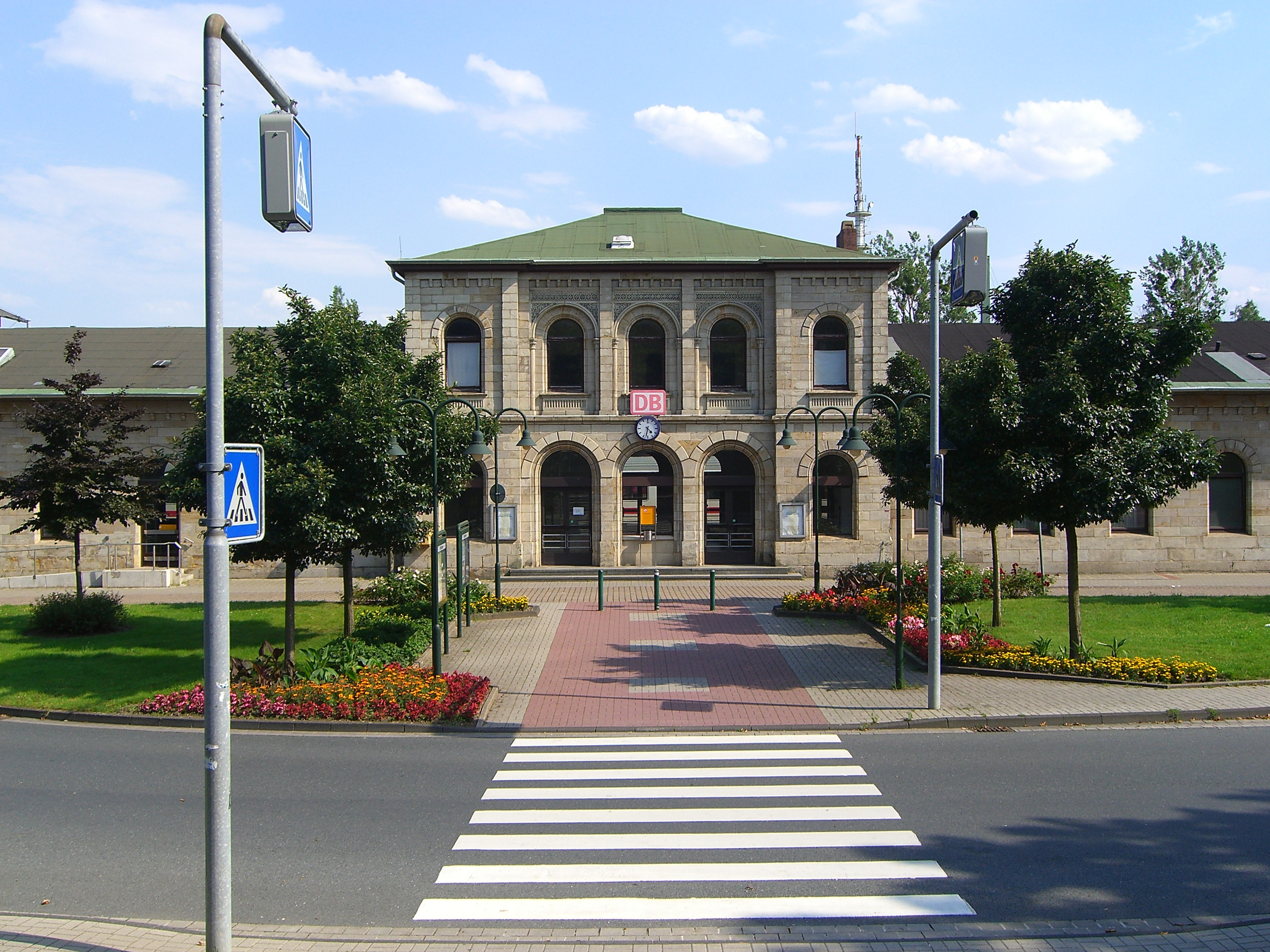
- Helmstedt railway station

General information
- Location: Helmstedt, Lower Saxony; Germany
- Owner: DB Netz
- Operator: DB Station&Service
- Lines: Brunswick–Magdeburg railway; Jerxheim–Helmstedt railway (closed 2007); Helmstedt–Oebisfelde railway
- Platforms: 3

Other information
- Station code: 2677
- DS100 code: HHLM
- IBNR: 8000159
- Category: 4
- Fare zone: VRB: 30; marego: 904 (VRB transitional tariff, rail only)
- Website: www.bahnhof.de

Services
Preceding station	DB Fernverkehr	Following station
Braunschweig Hbf towards Norddeich Mole	IC 56	Magdeburg Hbf towards Leipzig Hbf or Cottbus Hbf
Preceding station	DB Regio Südost	Following station
Frellstedt towards Braunschweig Hbf	RB 40	Marienborn towards Burg (bei Magdeburg)
Location
- Location within Lower Saxony Location within Germany Location within Europe

Helmstedt (German: Bahnhof Helmstedt) is a railway station located in Helmstedt, Germany. The station is located on the Brunswick–Magdeburg railway. The trains are run by Deutsche Bahn.

== Train services ==
The following services currently call at the station:

- IC 56: Norddeich - Emden - Oldenburg - Bremen - Hannover - Braunschweig - Magdeburg - Halle - Leipzig
- RB 40: Braunschweig - Helmstedt - Magdeburg - Burg
