= Magdeburg Hauptbahnhof =

Railway station in Magdeburg, Germany

Magdeburg Hbf
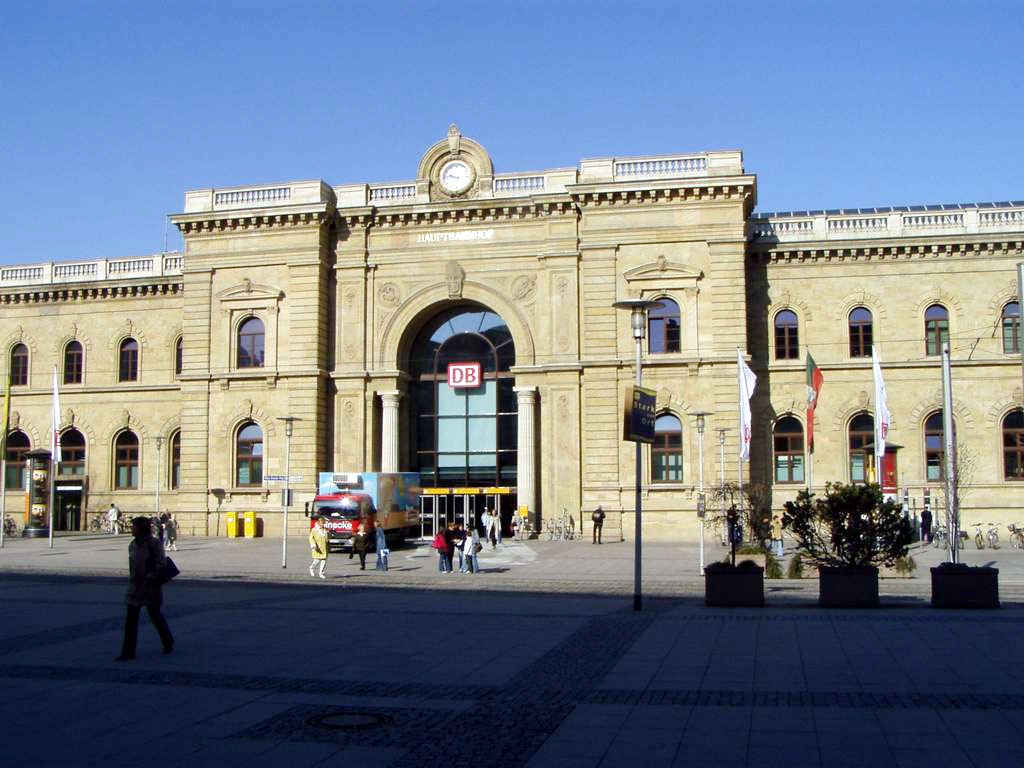
- Entrance hall

General information
- Location: Magdeburg, Saxony-Anhalt; Germany
- Coordinates: 52°7′50″N 11°37′40″E
- Lines: Berlin–Magdeburg (km 141.8); Magdeburg–Wittenberge (km 0.0); Magdeburg–Leipzig (km 0.0); Braunschweig–Magdeburg (km 141.8); Magdeburg–Thale / Blankenburg (Harz) (km 0.0)
- Platforms: 10

Construction
- Accessible: Yes
- Architect: Ludwig Heim

Other information
- Station code: 3881
- DS100 code: LM
- IBNR: 8010224
- Category: 2
- Fare zone: marego: 010
- Website: www.bahnhof.de

History
- Opened: 15 May 1873; 153 years ago
- Electrified: 1923-1946; 6 January 1957; 69 years ago

Passengers
- 40,000
Services
Preceding station	DB Fernverkehr	Following station
Braunschweig Hbf towards Köln Hbf	ICE 10	Brandenburg Hbf towards Berlin Ostbahnhof
Köthen towards Leipzig Hbf	IC 17	Brandenburg Hbf towards Ostseebad Binz
Braunschweig Hbf towards Stuttgart Hbf	IC 55	Köthen towards Dresden Hbf
Helmstedt towards Emden Außenhafen or Norddeich Mole	IC 56	Köthen towards Leipzig Hbf
Helmstedt towards Emden Außenhafen or Norddeich Mole	IC 56	Brandenburg Hbf towards Cottbus Hbf
Stendal Hbf towards Rostock Hbf or Warnemünde	IC 57	Köthen towards Leipzig Hbf
Preceding station	Start	Following station
Magdeburg-Neustadt towards Wolfsburg Hbf	RE 6	Terminus
Magdeburg-Buckau towards Erfurt Hbf	RE 10	Terminus
Magdeburg-Buckau towards Thale Hbf	RE 11	Terminus
Magdeburg-Buckau towards Goslar	RE 21	Terminus
Magdeburg-Buckau towards Blankenburg (Harz)	RE 31	Terminus
Magdeburg-Neustadt towards Wolfsburg Hbf	RB 36	Terminus
Magdeburg-Buckau towards Aschersleben	RB 41	Terminus
Magdeburg-Buckau towards Oschersleben (Bode)	RB 43	Terminus
Magdeburg-Buckau towards Halle (Saale) Hbf	RB 47	Terminus
Preceding station	Ostdeutsche Eisenbahn	Following station
Terminus	RE 1	Magdeburg-Neustadt towards Cottbus Hbf
Preceding station	DB Regio Südost	Following station
Terminus	RE 13	Magdeburg-Neustadt towards Leipzig Hbf
Terminus	RE 20	Magdeburg-Neustadt towards Uelzen
Magdeburg-Buckau towards Halle (Saale) Hbf	RE 30	Terminus
Magdeburg-Sudenburg towards Braunschweig Hbf	RB 40	Magdeburg-Neustadt towards Burg (bei Magdeburg)
Preceding station	Mittelelbe S-Bahn	Following station
Magdeburg-Hasselbachplatz towards Schönebeck-Bad Salzelmen	S 1	Magdeburg-Neustadt towards Wittenberge
Location

Magdeburg Hauptbahnhof (German for Magdeburg main station, sometimes translated as Magdeburg Central Station) is the main railway station in the city of Magdeburg in the northern part of the German state of Saxony-Anhalt.

== Importance ==
The station is the main station of Magdeburg and along with Halle Hauptbahnhof the centre of long-distance rail transport in Saxony-Anhalt. It is also connected to the Magdeburg S-Bahn network and the HarzElbeExpress regional rail network.

== History ==
The current main station is built on the site of the western side of the former Magdeburg Fortress. Several competing railway companies had built lines to Magdeburg between 1839 and 1849, each with their own stations. They were built on the west bank of the Elbe river, on reclaimed land. With the increasing industrialisation and growing importance of Magdeburg, the need for space at stations grew. A central station, however, was not feasible at first.

As the existing railway facilities in Magdeburg became more inadequate the construction of a central station became more urgent. Both the city of Magdeburg and various railway companies conducted lengthy negotiations with the military with the objective of buying the grounds of the disused fortress. In 1870, three railway companies, the Berlin-Potsdam-Magdeburg Railway, the Magdeburg-Halberstadt Railway, Magdeburg-Leipzig Railway finally reached an agreement to buy the 33 hectares of the fortifications from the state of Prussia.

=== Construction ===
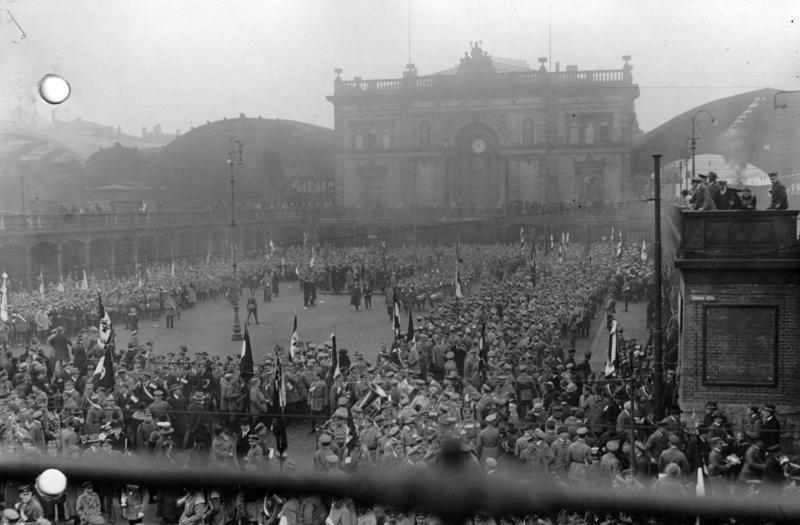
Former western station building and concourse (January 1925) - now Kölner Platz

The foundation stone for the new Magdeburg station was laid in 1870. The companies involved were the Berlin-Potsdam-Magdeburg Railway, the Magdeburg-Halberstadt Railway, both of which had been strongly affected by the confined spaces of the stations on the banks of the Elbe, and lastly, the Magdeburg-Leipzig Railway which was less troubled by its existing infrastructure.

The companies built two entrance buildings. The Magdeburg-Leipzig Railway constructed the eastern entrance building in the style of a Tuscan palace between 1872 and 1882. Its cladding consists of sandstone obtained from Königslutter. The western entrance building was built by the Berlin-Potsdam-Magdeburg Railway and was shared with the Magdeburg-Halberstadt Railway. In contrast to the eastern building, Nebra sandstone was used for the north facade of the western building, its walls were made of bricks faced with stone. Both buildings were of equal length and connected with each other by separate tunnels for passengers and baggage.

On 15 May 1873 the first train ran between the new station and the town of Burg. The official opening took place on 18 August 1873. Construction works continued until 1893. In addition to the passenger station there were also extensive freight facilities.

On 1 July 1923 the first electric train ran from Zerbst to Magdeburg Hauptbahnhof. Electrification had begun in 1910, but had been interrupted by World War I. From 7 October 1934 electric trains also ran to Halle.

=== Damage in World War II ===
As an infrastructure building, the central station was subject of heavy bombing during World War II. On 16 January 1945 the station was hit in a severe air raid on the city. The western station building was completely destroyed and never rebuilt, while the eastern entrance building was heavily damaged and the platform halls were partially collapsed. The tracks were littered with bomb craters and the signal boxes were partially destroyed by the bombing.

=== Reconstruction after 1945 ===
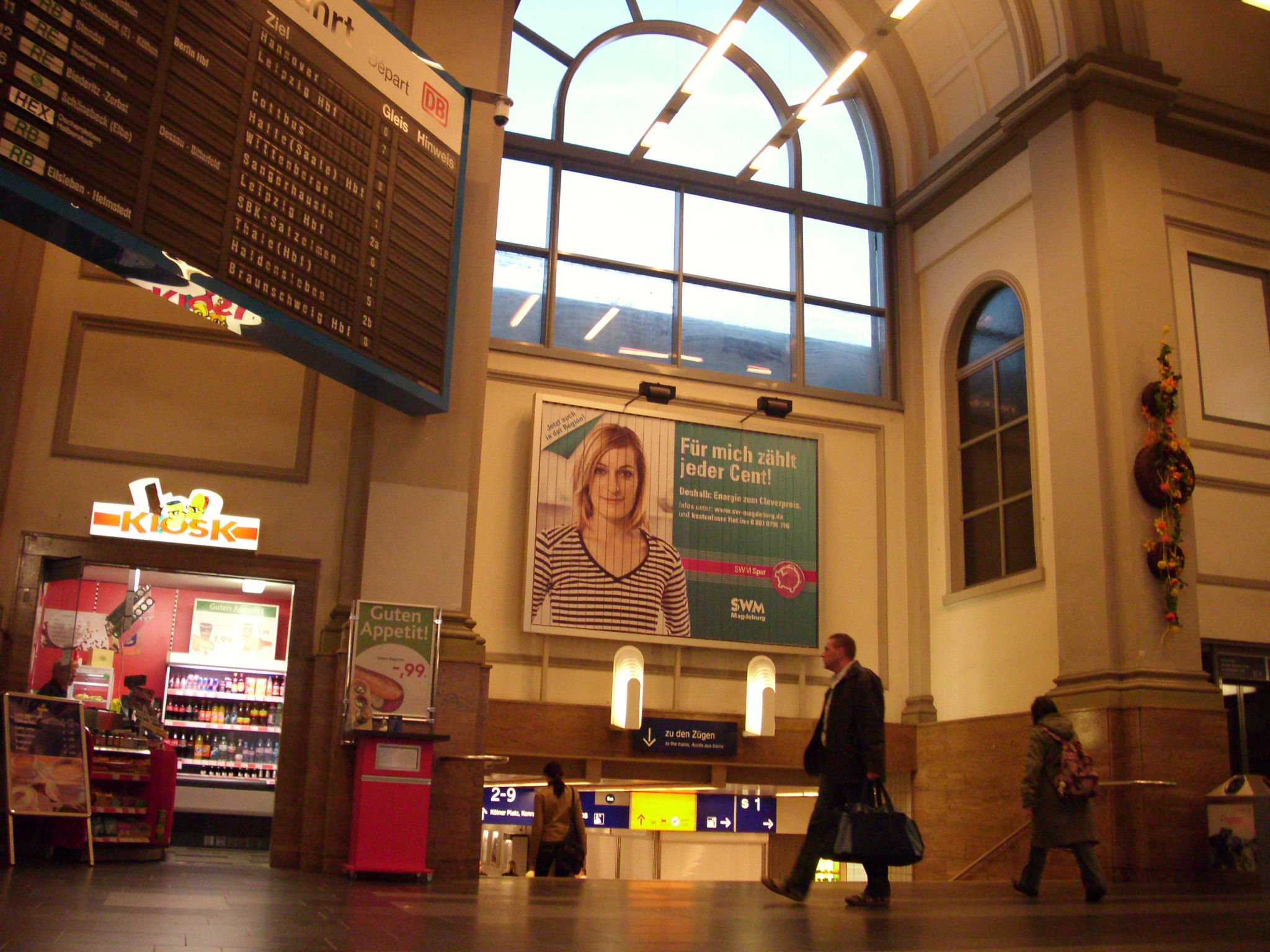
Entrance hall

At the end of March 1946, the restoration of the electrification had been completed on the rail networks in the Soviet occupation zone. Then, the Soviet military authorities then demanded the removal of the overhead line equipment and the transfer of the electrical rolling stock as reparations to the Soviet Union, which was partly returned in the early 1950s in need of repair. The rail network was then electrified for the third time, and electric train operation resumed in 1956. Reconstructed of the main station started in 1946, but the platform halls were omitted.

In 1974, the Magdeburg S-Bahn was established. More extensive alterations were made in 1984. After German reunification in 1992, platforms were lengthened to allow Intercity-Express operation. In 2003, the pedestrian tunnel was extended to connect the various platforms to an entrance on the western side of the station. The station was modernised again between 2008 and 2015 at a cost of about €300 million.

== Train services ==
The following services currently call at the station:

Line	Route	Operator	Frequency
ICE 10	Cologne – Düsseldorf – Düsseldorf Airport – Duisburg – Essen – Dortmund – Hanover – Magdeburg – Berlin Hbf – Berlin Ostbahnhof	DB Fernverkehr	One train pair
IC 55; ICE 55	Stuttgart – Heidelberg – Mainz – Mannheim – Koblenz – Bonn – Cologne – Wuppertal – Dortmund – Hamm – Hannover – Braunschweig – Magdeburg – Halle – Leipzig/Halle Airport – Leipzig – Dresden	DB Fernverkehr	Every 2 hours
IC 56	Leipzig – Köthen – Magdeburg – Braunschweig – Hannover – Bremen – Oldenburg – Emden – Norddeich Mole	DB Fernverkehr	Every 2 hours
IC 57	Magdeburg – Stendal – Wittenberge – Ludwigslust – Hamburg	DB Fernverkehr	1 train pair
IC 57	Leipzig – Halle – Magdeburg – Stendal – Wittenberge – Ludwigslust –Schwerin – Rostock (– Warnemünde)	DB Fernverkehr	2 train pairs
HBX	Berlin – Potsdam – Magdeburg – Halberstadt (train split) – Quedlinburg – Thale / Wernigerode – Goslar	Start	Some trains (Fri–Sun)
RE 1	Magdeburg – Brandenburg – Potsdam – Berlin – Erkner – Fürstenwalde – Frankfurt (Oder) (– Cottbus)	Ostdeutsche Eisenbahn	Hourly
RE 6	Magdeburg – Haldensleben – Oebisfelde – Wolfsburg	Start	Some trains
RE 10	Magdeburg – Stendal – Salzwedel – Uelzen	Start	Every 2 hours
RE 11	Magdeburg – Halberstadt – Thale	Start	Hourly
RE 13	Magdeburg – Dessau – Leipzig	DB Regio Südost	Every 2 hours
RE 20	Magdeburg – Stendal – Salzwedel – Uelzen	DB Regio Südost	Hourly
RE 21	Magdeburg — Halberstadt – Goslar	Start	Every 2 hours
RE 30	Magdeburg – Halle	DB Regio Südost	Hourly
RE 31	Magdeburg – Osterweddingen – Oschersleben – Halberstadt (split from RE11) – Langenstein – Blankenburg	Start	Every 2 hours
RB 36	Magdeburg – Haldensleben – Wolfsburg	Start	Hourly
RB 40	Braunschweig – Magdeburg – Burg	DB Regio Südost	Hourly
RB 41	Magdeburg – Staßfurt – Aschersleben	Start	Every 2 hours
RB 43	Magdeburg – Langenweddingen – Oschersleben (Bode)	Start	Hourly
RB 47	Magdeburg – Magdeburg-Buckau – Schönebeck – Calbe – Bernburg – Könnern – Halle-Trotha – Halle	Start	Some trains
S 1	Wittenberge – Stendal – Magdeburg – Schönebeck (Elbe) – Schönebeck-Salzelmen	S-Bahn Mittelelbe	Hourly

== See also ==
- Rail transport in Germany
- Railway stations in Germany
