= Sickte =

- Municipality
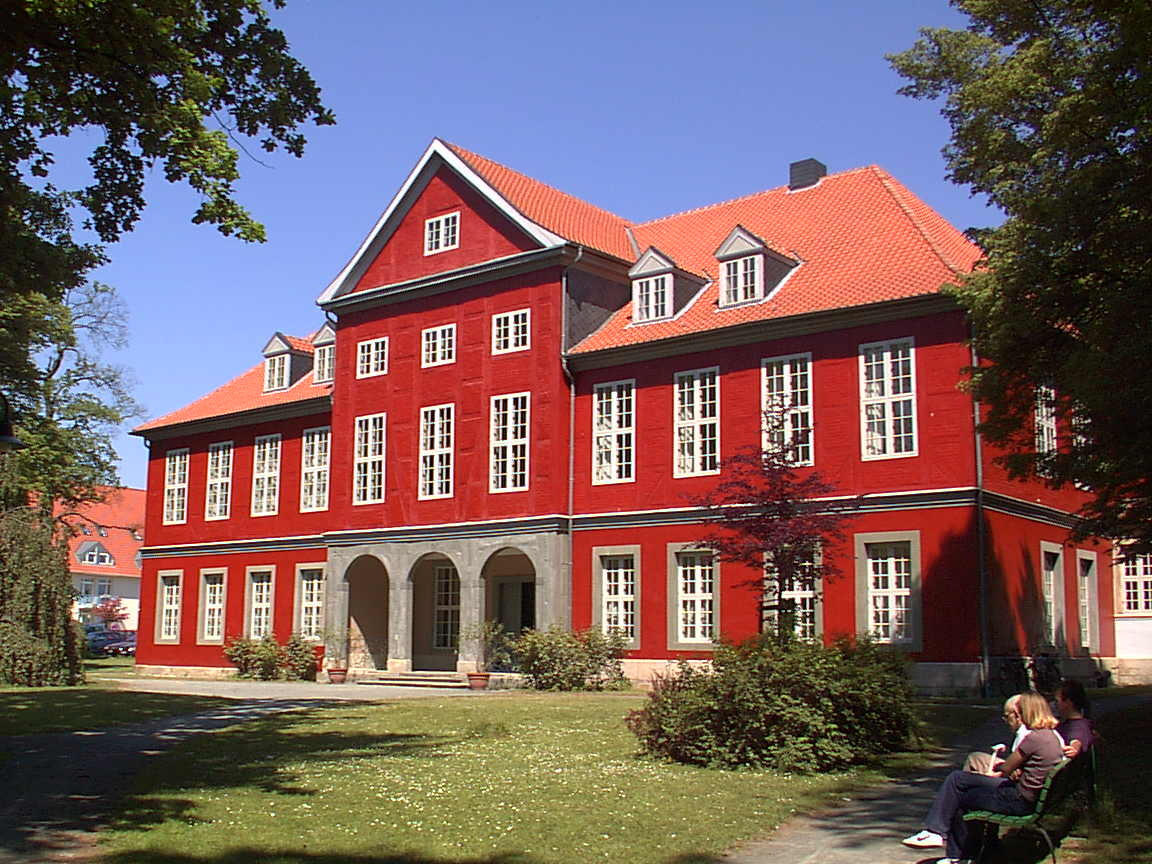
- Herrenhaus in Sickte

- Coat of arms

- Location of Sickte within Wolfenbüttel district
- Interactive map of Sickte
- Location within Germany Location within Lower Saxony
- Coordinates: 52°12′56″N 10°38′16″E
- Country: Germany
- State: Lower Saxony
- District: Wolfenbüttel
- Municipal assoc.: Sickte
- Subdivisions: 4 Ortsteile

Government
  - Mayor: Ingo Geisler (CDU)

Area
  - Total: 25.35 km^{2} (9.79 sq mi)
- Elevation: 94 m (308 ft)

Population (2025-12-31)
  - Total: 6,007
  - Density: 237.0/km^{2} (613.7/sq mi)
- Time zone: UTC+01:00 (CET)
  - Summer (DST): UTC+02:00 (CEST)
- Postal codes: 38173
- Dialling codes: 05305
- Vehicle registration: WF
- Website: www.sickte.de

Sickte (German pronunciation: [ˈzɪktə]) is a municipality in the district of Wolfenbüttel, in Lower Saxony, Germany. It is situated west of the Elm, approx. 10 km northeast of Wolfenbüttel, and 10 km southeast of Braunschweig.

Sickte is the seat of the Samtgemeinde ("collective municipality") Sickte.
