= Schöppenstedt station =

Railway station in Schöppenstedt, Germany

Schöppenstedt
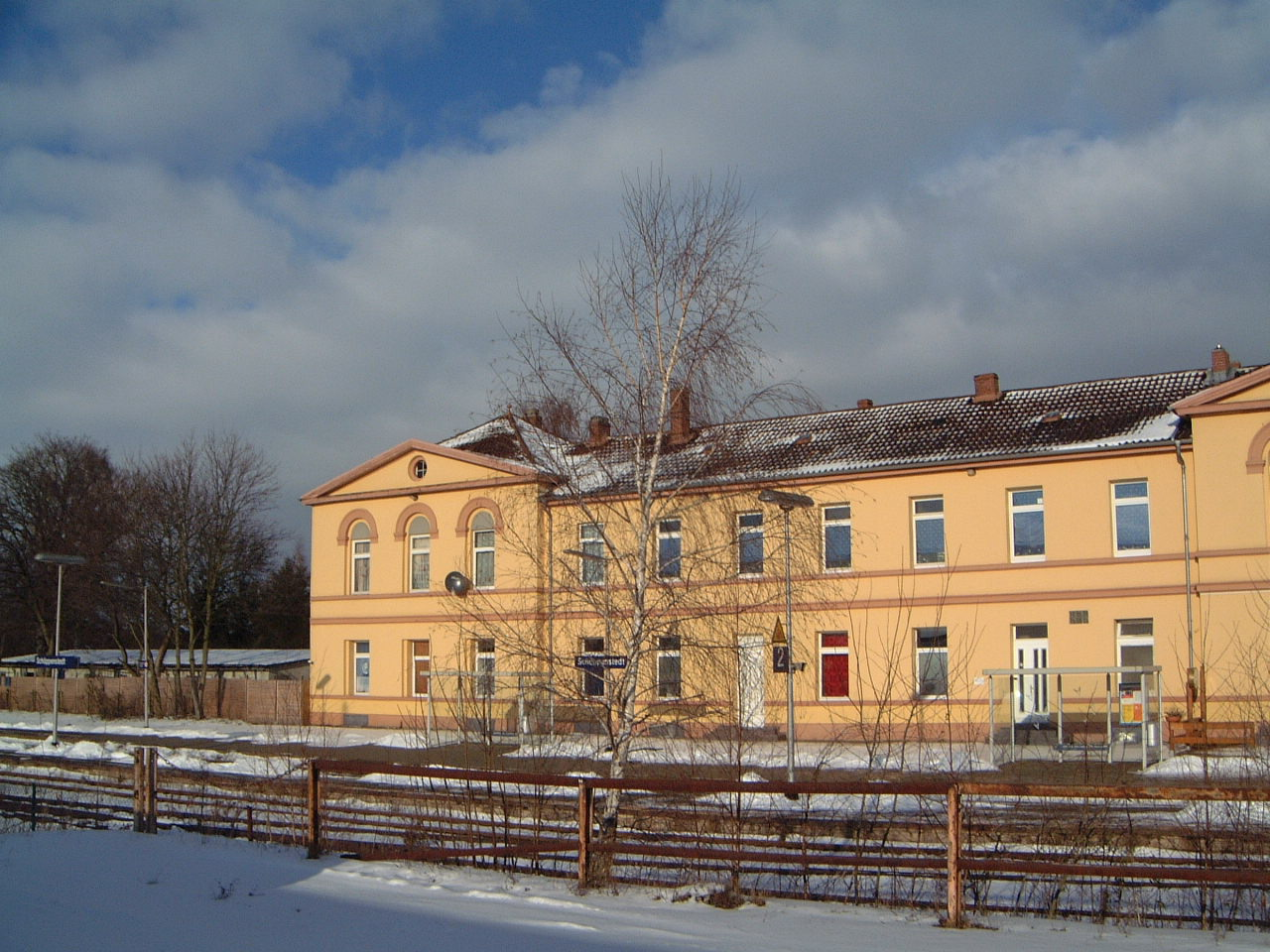
- 2005

General information
- Location: Bahnhofstraße 18; 38170 Schöppenstedt; Lower Saxony; Germany
- Coordinates: 52°08′26″N 10°46′19″E
- System: Bf
- Owner: Deutsche Bahn
- Operator: DB Station&Service
- Lines: Wolfenbüttel–Oschersleben railway (KBS 312)
- Platforms: 2 side platforms
- Tracks: 2
- Train operators: DB Regio Nord
- Connections: RB 45; 370 371 372 730 733 752

Other information
- Station code: 5681
- DS100 code: HSPP
- IBNR: 8005413
- Category: 6
- Fare zone: VRB: 73
- Website: www.bahnhof.de

Services
Preceding station	DB Regio Nord	Following station
Dettum towards Braunschweig Hbf	RB 45	Terminus
Location
- Location within Lower Saxony

Schöppenstedt station is a railway station in the municipality of Schöppenstedt, located in the Wolfenbüttel district in Lower Saxony, Germany.
