= Dettum =

- Municipality
- Location of Dettum within Wolfenbüttel district
- Interactive map of Dettum
- Location within Germany Location within Lower Saxony
- Coordinates: 52°10′N 10°40′E
- Country: Germany
- State: Lower Saxony
- District: Wolfenbüttel
- Municipal assoc.: Sickte
- Subdivisions: 3 Ortsteile

Government
  - Mayor: Willi Dietzsch

Area
  - Total: 17.16 km^{2} (6.63 sq mi)
- Elevation: 104 m (341 ft)

Population (2025-12-31)
  - Total: 1,168
  - Density: 68.07/km^{2} (176.3/sq mi)
- Time zone: UTC+01:00 (CET)
  - Summer (DST): UTC+02:00 (CEST)
- Postal codes: 38173
- Dialling codes: 05333
- Vehicle registration: WF
- Website: www.dettum.de

Dettum is a municipality in the district of Wolfenbüttel, in Lower Saxony, Germany.
