= Haldensleben station =

Railway station in Haldensleben, Germany

Haldensleben

General information
- Location: Bahnhofsplatz 1; 39340 Haldensleben; Saxony-Anhalt, Germany
- Coordinates: 52°17′05″N 11°24′24″E
- Owner: DB Netz
- Operator: DB Station&Service
- Lines: Oebisfelde–Magdeburg (KBS 308)
- Platforms: 2 side platforms
- Tracks: 3
- Train operators: Abellio Rail Mitteldeutschland

Other information
- Station code: 2493
- DS100 code: LHL
- IBNR: 8010158
- Category: 5
- Fare zone: marego: 320
- Website: www.bahnhof.de

Services
Preceding station	Abellio Rail Mitteldeutschland	Following station
Oebisfelde towards Wolfsburg Hbf	RE 6	Magdeburg-Neustadt towards Magdeburg Hbf
Flechtingen towards Wolfsburg Hbf	RB 36	Vahldorf towards Magdeburg Hbf
Location
- Location within Saxony-Anhalt Location within Germany Location within Europe

Haldensleben (German: Bahnhof Haldensleben) is a railway station in the town of Haldensleben, Saxony-Anhalt, Germany. The station lies on the Oebisfelde–Magdeburg railway and the train services are operated by Abellio Rail Mitteldeutschland.

== Train services ==
The station is served by the following services:

- RB 36 Wolfsburg - Oebisfelde - Haldensleben - Magdeburg
