= Marienborn =

- Ortsteil of Sommersdorf
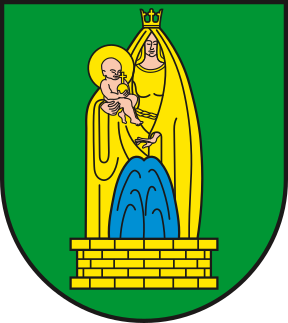
- Coat of arms
- Interactive map of Marienborn
- Location within Germany Location within Saxony-Anhalt
- Coordinates: 52°12′N 11°7′E
- Country: Germany
- State: Saxony-Anhalt
- District: Börde
- Municipality: Sommersdorf

Area
  - Total: 9.98 km^{2} (3.85 sq mi)
- Elevation: 154 m (505 ft)

Population (2006-12-31)
  - Total: 511
  - Density: 51.2/km^{2} (133/sq mi)
- Time zone: UTC+01:00 (CET)
  - Summer (DST): UTC+02:00 (CEST)
- Postal codes: 39365
- Dialling codes: 039400
- Vehicle registration: BK

Marienborn is a village and a former municipality in the Börde district in Saxony-Anhalt, Germany. Since 1 January 2010, it has been part of the municipality of Sommersdorf. It is about 27 km (17 mi) southwest of Haldensleben. The historic pilgrimage centre near the former inner German border is known for the preserved Helmstedt-Marienborn border crossing, now a memorial site.

In 1191 Wichmann von Seeburg, then Archbishop of Magdeburg, established an asylum at the site of an apparition of the Virgin Mary and a spring (Born) with healing waters, which during the 13th century evolved into a monastery for Augustinian nuns. The sisters of Marienborn abbey left a monastery church and cloister with foundations from about 1200, while the pilgrimage chapel at the spring is a replica dating from the 19th century.

== Transportation ==
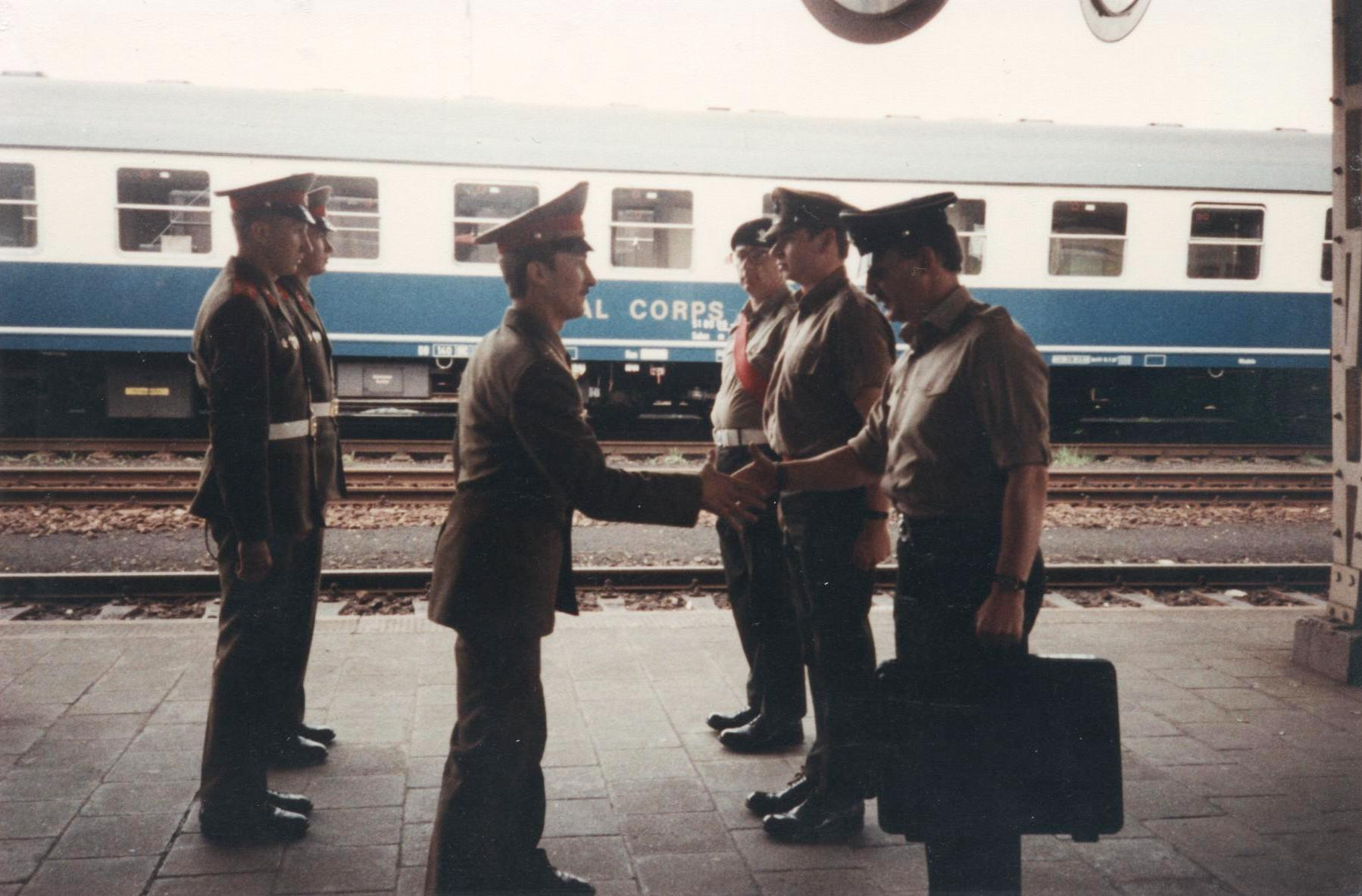
British and Russian soldiers at the former border station in April 1990

Marienborn has access to the Bundesautobahn 2 (a transit road during the division of Germany) and the Bundesstraße 1 federal highway. The former railway border crossing at Marienborn station is today a stop on the railway line from Braunschweig to Magdeburg, served by Regionalbahn trains of the Deutsche Bahn company.
