= Brunswick–Magdeburg railway =

Railway line in Germany

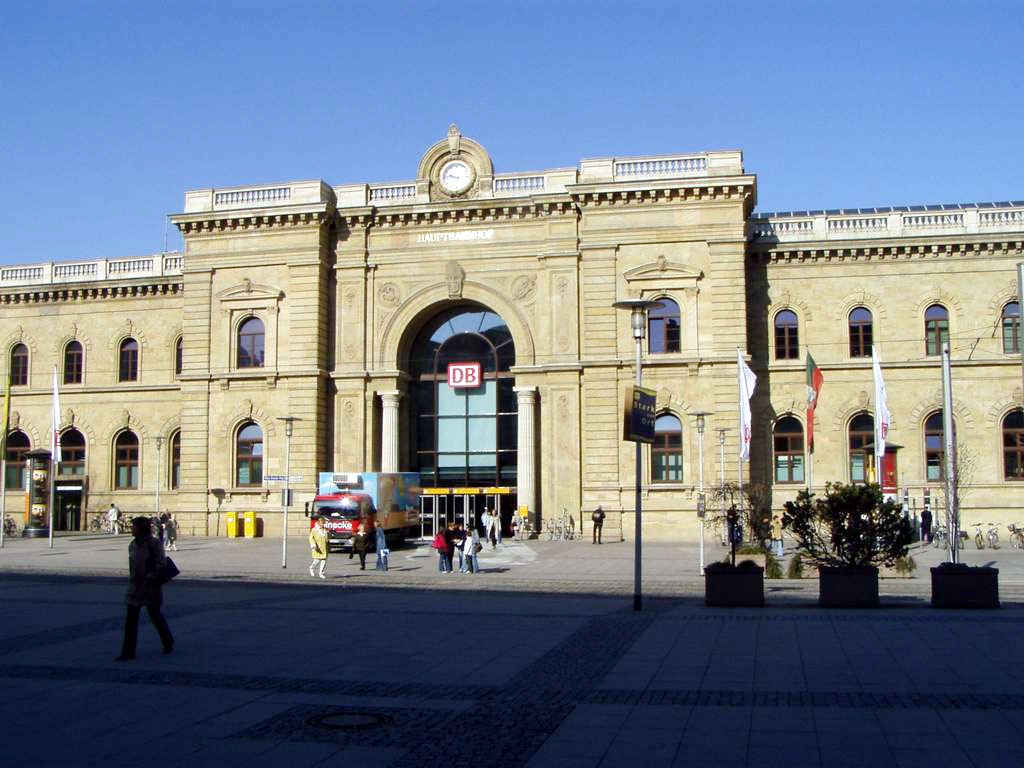
- Magdeburg station

Overview
- Native name: Bahnstrecke Braunschweig–Magdeburg
- Line number: 1900 Brunswick–Helmstedt; 6400 Helmstedt–Eilsleben; 6110 Eilsleben–Magdeburg
- Locale: Lower Saxony and Saxony-Anhalt, Germany

Service
- Route number: 310

Technical
- Line length: 83.0 km (51.6 mi)
- Track gauge: 1,435 mm (4 ft 8 1/2 in) standard gauge
- Electrification: 15 kV/16.7 Hz AC; Overhead catenary
- Operating speed: 120 km/h (75 mph) (Brunswick-Helmstedt, maximum); 160 km/h (99 mph) (Helmstedt-Magdeburg, maximum)

The Brunswick–Magdeburg railway is an 83-kilometre-long (52 mi) German main line railway. It is with the Berlin–Lehrte railway and the Hanover–Berlin high-speed line one of the most important east-west lines between Hanover and Berlin. Important intermediate stations are Königslutter, Helmstedt and Eilsleben.

It is now used mainly for east-west freight traffic, as well as Intercity and Regionalbahn trains.

== History ==
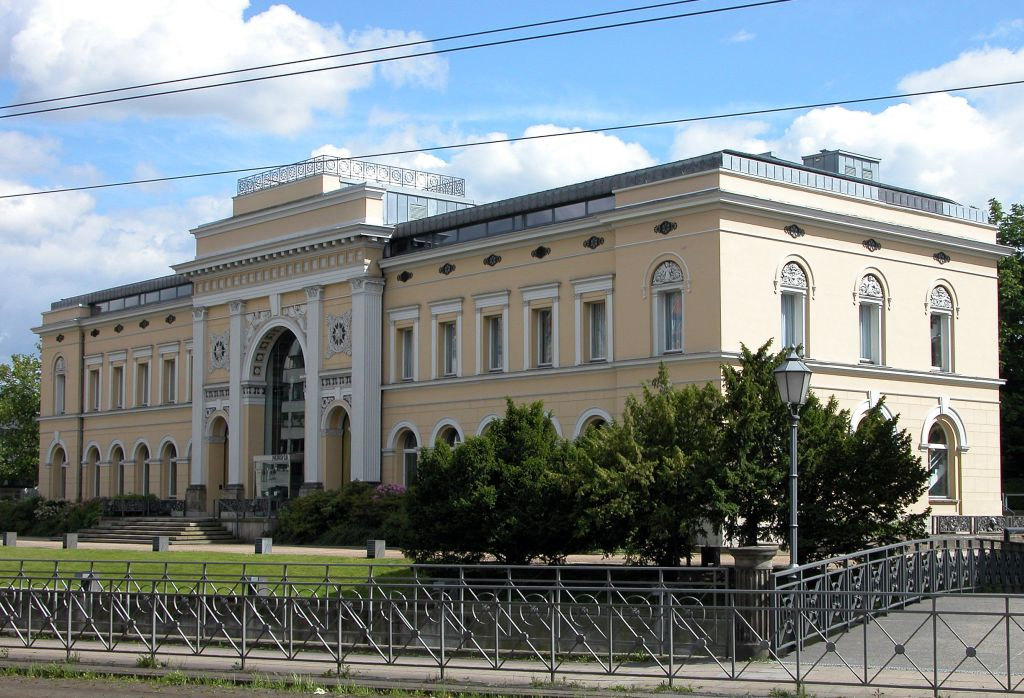
Old Brunswick station, closed in 1960

Brunswick (German: Braunschweig) and Magdeburg had already been connected with a railway line via Wolfenbüttel, Jerxheim and Oschersleben in 1843. This line took a southerly route, taking advantage of easy terrain. In Wolfenbüttel it connected with the Brunswick–Bad Harzburg line and in Oschersleben it connected with the Magdeburg–Halberstadt line. This connected the lines of the Duchy of Brunswick State Railway and Magdeburg-Halberstädt Railway Company (German: Magdeburg-Halberstädter Eisenbahn-Gesellschaft, MHE).

This was followed in 1844 by the Hanover–Brunswick railway and in 1846 by the Magdeburg–Potsdam line. In 1845 the Old Brunswick station was opened as a terminus.

As traffic increased, the MHE sought from the early 1860s to build a direct Berlin-Hanover line. This was initially rejected by the governments of the Kingdom of Hanover and Duchy of Brunswick. After Hanover lost the war of 1866, and were annexed by Prussia, the MHE set about building its Berlin-Lehrte line via Stendal. This route bypassed the cities of Magdeburg and Brunswick and threatened the importance of the line of the Berlin-Potsdam-Magdeburg Railway Company (German: Berlin-Potsdam-Magdeburger Eisenbahngesellschaft, BPME), especially since it connected in the west only to the network of its rival, the MHE.

=== Construction and opening ===
The BPME considered several options for a dedicated connection between its main line and the former Duchy of Brunswick State Railway network, which had been privatised and was now the Brunswick Railway Company (Braunschweigische Eisenbahngesellschaft). While it was clear that its eastern end would be in Magdeburg, in the west several variants were discussed. Brunswick was an important destination and connected well to the west, but had an unfavourable terminal station. It was decided to build a line from Magdeburg to Eilsleben, where it would branch to Helmstedt and Schöningen. From Helmstedt the Brunswick Railway Company would continue the line to Brunswick, while in Schöningen there had been since 1868 a connection to Jerxheim, which had a link to Börßum and the Brunswick Southern Railway to Kreiensen. It there connected with Göttingen and Kassel via the Hanoverian Southern Railway and via Altenbeken to the Ruhr district via the Altenbeken–Kreiensen railway. This gave the new line the same connections to the west as the MHE’s main line.

Between Eilsleben and Brunswick the line crosses the Lappwald ridge and the Elm hills. The line is winding and passes over embankments and through cuttings. The line was opened on 15 September 1872.

=== Development up to World War II ===
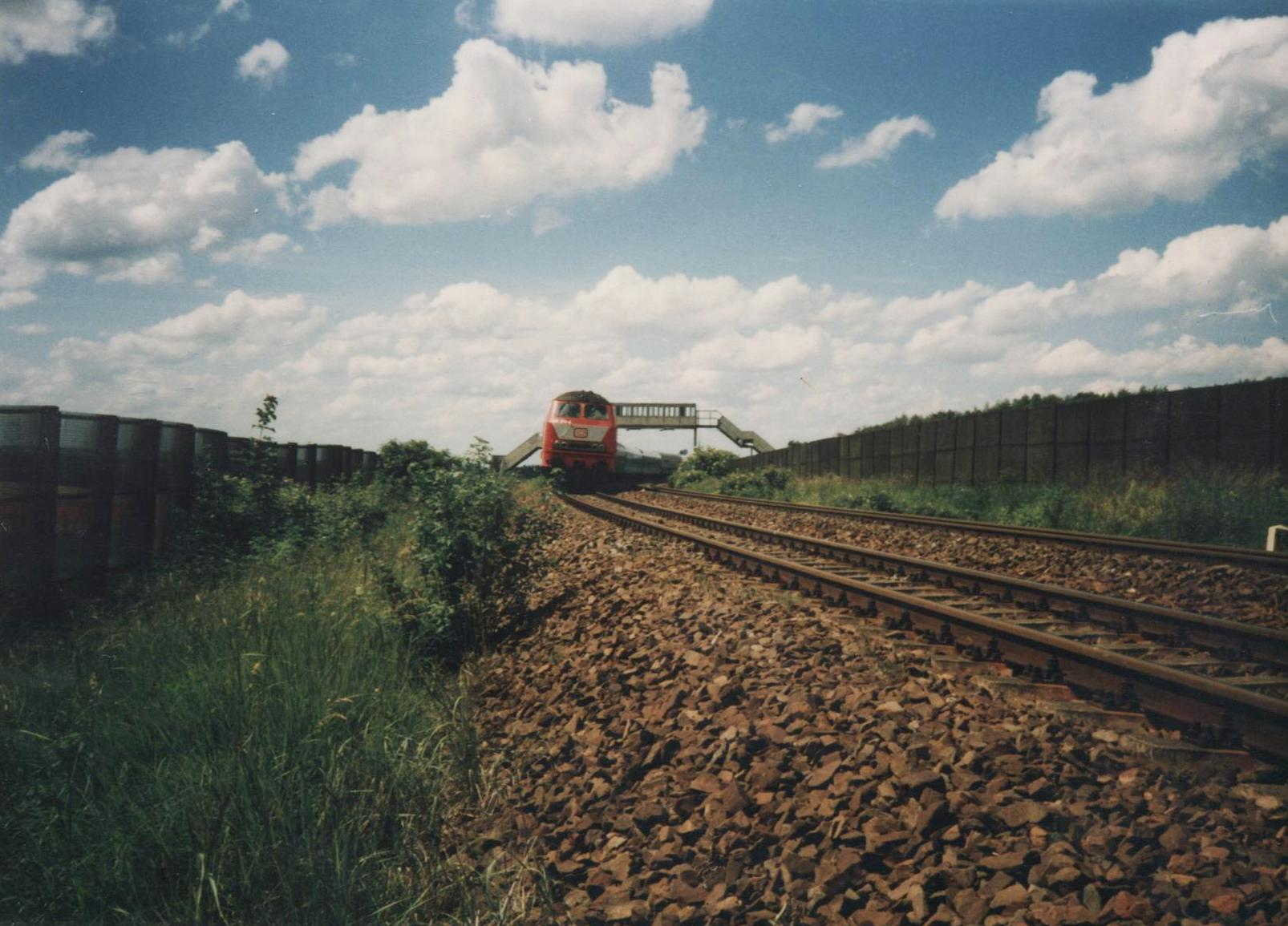
Train between Helmstedt and Marienborn in April 1990

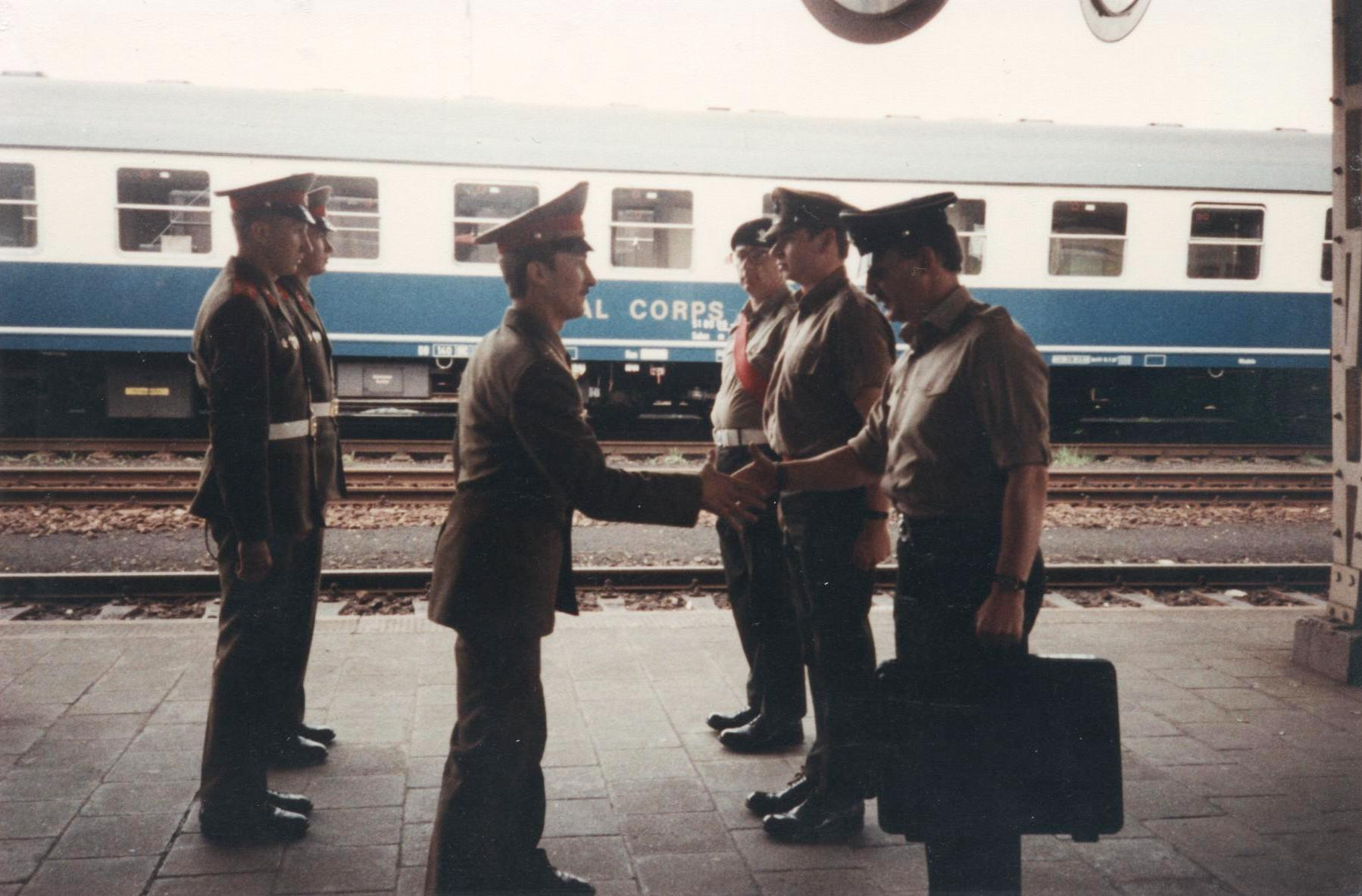
British and Russian soldiers at the former border station of Marienborn in April 1990

While the Berlin–Lehrte line, opened a year earlier, remained the fastest line for passenger between Hanover and Berlin, the line via Helmstedt also carried passenger traffic between the two cities and traffic from Hanover to Halle and Leipzig. In addition, substantial freight traffic was carried on both branches. In 1937 five express trains ran each day each way on the line.

=== Transit route ===
Since the line passed through relatively undemanding terrain and has no large structures, it was only impassable for a few days during and after World War II. The allies decided to use this line exclusively for the military transport of the Western powers in Berlin. The Berlin–Lehrte line remained usable, but was used less.

In 1960, the current Brunswick Hauptbahnhof opened, which removed the need for trains between Magdeburg and Hanover to reverse.

Rail transport between Helmstedt and Eilsleben was reopened under the Transit Agreement of 1972. In the 1980s, there were negotiations between West Germany and East Germany over an expansion of the transit routes. East Germany preferred the Lehrte line, to keep transit traffic out of Potsdam and Magdeburg. In the West, however, there were discussions of improved connections with Brunswick.

=== German Unity Transport Project ===
After the fall of the wall it was quickly decided to build a high-speed line between Hanover and Berlin. However, it was also clear that the construction would take several years. The initial experience with speed lines also showed that a separation of freight and high speed passenger traffic made sense. Under the German Unity Transport Projects, it was decided to restore as quickly as possible the existing routes and to electrify lines that were intended primarily for freight later. The core of this plan was the Helmstedt–Magdeburg line. In 1993 it was upgraded for operations at 160 km/h and electrified. In the east it connected with the Biederitz–Dessau line, which in turn connected at Güterglück with a now closed section of the former Canon railway, leading to Berlin. The direct line to Berlin via Brandenburg (Havel) and Potsdam was electrified in 1995.

In 1991 the first diesel-powered Intercity train ran from Hanover via Brunswick and Magdeburg to Berlin. Two years later the first Intercity-Express (ICE) ran on the line. The major change came in 1998 when the Hanover–Berlin high-speed line opened. Since then, the hourly ICE trains between Frankfurt and Berlin run on the line only on the 5 km section between Brunswick and the junction with the Weddel loop.

== Operations in 2017 ==
Intercity passenger trains on the line Leipzig-Magdeburg-Hanover-Cologne/Oldenburg serve the line approximately hourly, provided by the IC 55 Dresden – Leipzig – Magdeburg – Hannover – Dortmund – Cologne and the IC 56 Leipzig – Magdeburg – Hannover – Bremen – Oldenburg, each running every two hours. In addition, there is a Regionalbahn services (the RB 40) that runs every hour on weekdays between Helmstedt and Magdeburg.

The line is heavily used for freight. It is part of an electrified corridor connecting the Czech Republic and the industrial regions of Saxony and Saxony-Anhalt with the German and Dutch seaports on the North Sea.
