= Burg (bei Magdeburg) station =

Railway station in Burg, Germany

Burg (b Magdeburg)
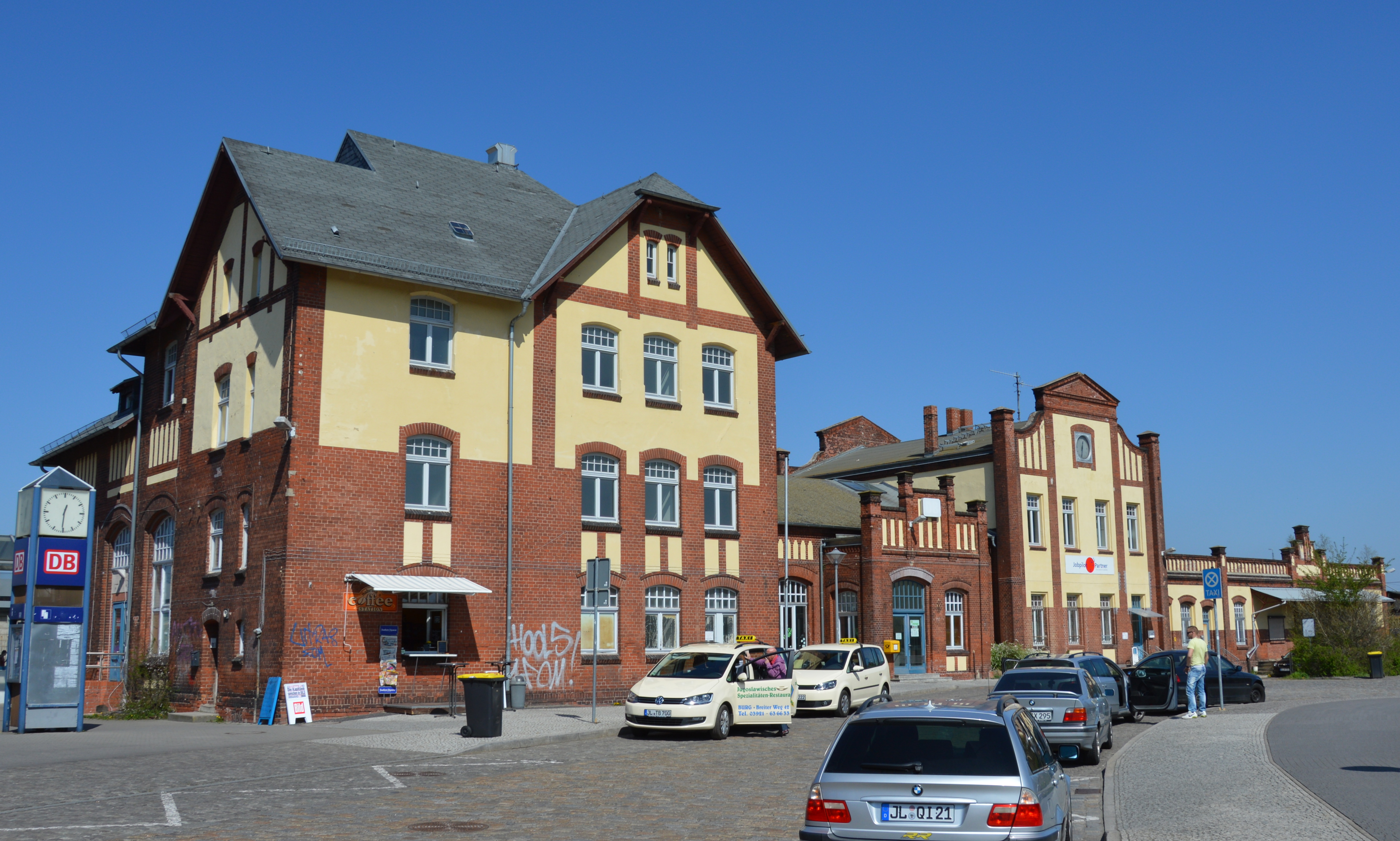
- 2015

General information
- Location: Bahnhofstraße 10; 39288 Burg bei Magdeburg; Saxony-Anhalt; Germany
- Coordinates: 52°16′28″N 11°50′27″E
- Owner: DB Netz
- Operator: DB Station&Service
- Lines: Berlin–Magdeburg railway (KBS 260)
- Platforms: 1 island platform 1 side platform
- Tracks: 3
- Train operators: DB Regio Nordost; DB Regio Südost

Other information
- Station code: 973
- DS100 code: LBU
- IBNR: 8011294
- Category: 4
- Fare zone: marego: 410
- Website: www.bahnhof.de

History
- Opened: 7 August 1846; 180 years ago

Services
Preceding station	Ostdeutsche Eisenbahn	Following station
Magdeburg-Neustadt towards Magdeburg Hbf	RE 1	Güsen (bei Genthin) towards Cottbus Hbf
Preceding station	DB Regio Südost	Following station
Möser towards Braunschweig Hbf	RB 40	Terminus
Location
- Location within Saxony-Anhalt

Burg (bei Magdeburg) station is a railway station in the municipality of Burg bei Magdeburg, located in the Jerichower Land district in Saxony-Anhalt, Germany.
