= Braunschweig Hauptbahnhof =

Railway station in Brunswick, Germany

Braunschweig Hbf
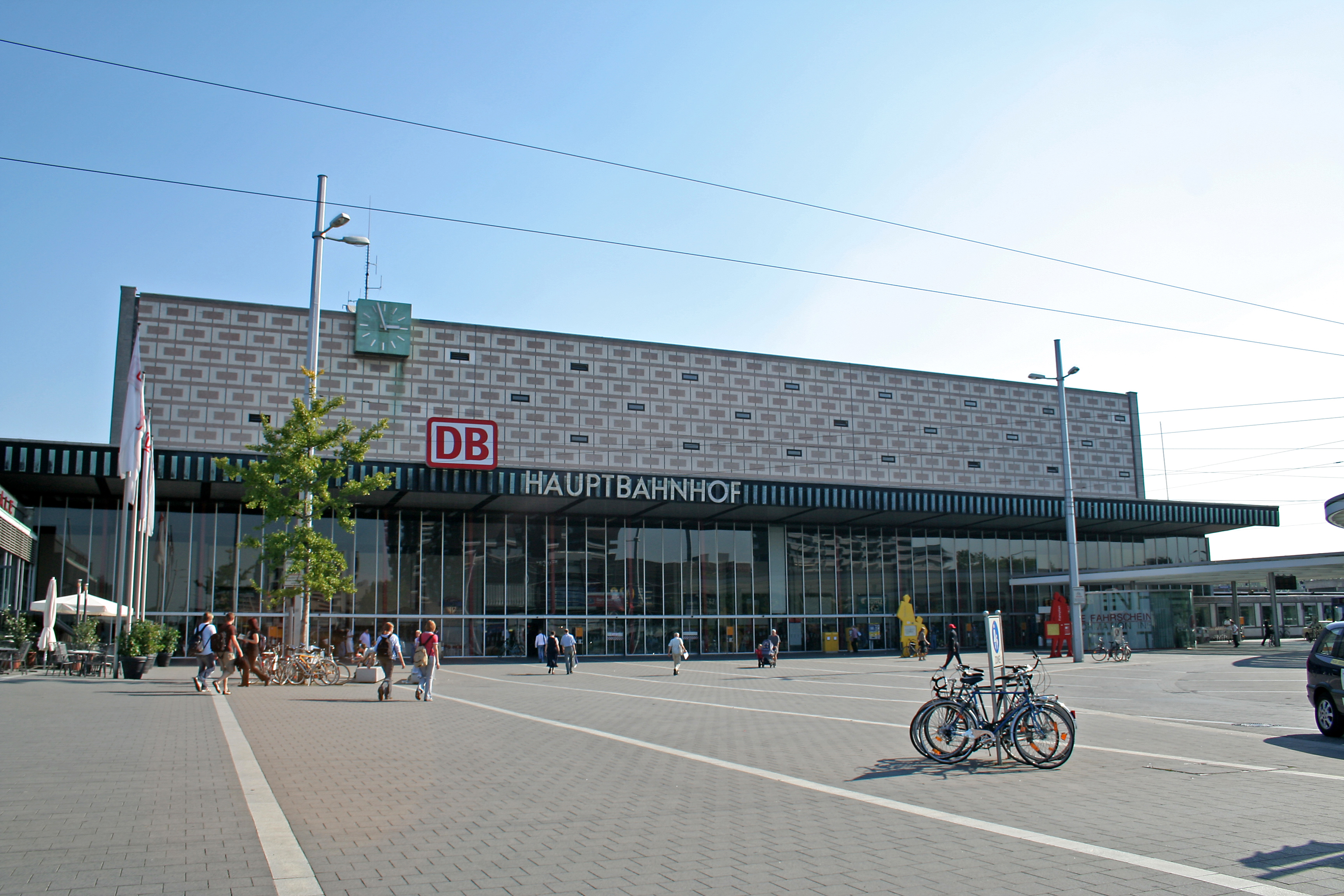
- View of the station building from Berliner Platz, September 2006

General information
- Location: Willy-Brandt-Platz 1, Braunschweig, Lower Saxony; Germany
- Coordinates: 52°15′08″N 10°32′23″E
- Lines: Brunswick–Magdeburg; Brunswick–Kreiensen; Brunswick–Hildesheim; Brunswick–Hanover; Brunswick–Bad Harzburg; Brunswick–Uelzen
- Platforms: 8

Construction
- Accessible: Yes
- Architect: Erwin Dürkop

Other information
- Station code: 835
- DS100 code: HBS
- IBNR: 8000049
- Category: 2
- Fare zone: VRB: 40
- Website: www.bahnhof.de

History
- Opened: 1 October 1960

Services
Preceding station	DB Fernverkehr	Following station
Hannover Hbf towards Köln Hbf	ICE 10	Magdeburg Hbf towards Berlin Ostbahnhof
Hannover Hbf One-way operation	ICE 10	Wolfsburg Hbf towards Berlin Ostbahnhof
Hildesheim Hbf towards Brig, Chur or Interlaken Ost	ICE 12	Wolfsburg Hbf towards Berlin Ostbahnhof
Hildesheim Hbf towards Frankfurt Airport, Frankfurt (Main) Hbf, Karlsruhe Hbf or Stuttgart Hbf	ICE 13	Wolfsburg Hbf towards Berlin Ostbahnhof
Hannover Hbf towards Stuttgart Hbf	IC 55	Magdeburg Hbf towards Dresden Hbf
Hannover Hbf towards Emden Hbf	IC 56	Helmstedt towards Leipzig Hbf or Cottbus Hbf
Preceding station	Metronom	Following station
Lengede-Broistedt towards Hildesheim Hbf	RE 50	Weddel towards Wolfsburg Hbf
Preceding station		Following station
Vechelde towards Rheine	RE 60	Terminus
Vechelde towards Bielefeld Hbf	RE 70	Terminus
Preceding station	DB Regio Südost	Following station
Terminus	RB 40	Weddel towards Burg (bei Magdeburg)
Preceding station		Following station
Wolfenbüttel towards Bad Harzburg	RB 42	Terminus
Wolfenbüttel towards Goslar	RB 43	Terminus
Braunschweig-Gliesmarode towards Uelzen	RB 47	Terminus
Preceding station	DB Regio Nord	Following station
Salzgitter-Thiede towards Salzgitter-Lebenstedt	RB 44	Terminus
Wolfenbüttel towards Schöppenstedt	RB 45	Terminus
Salzgitter-Bad towards Herzberg (Harz)	RB 46	Terminus
Location

Braunschweig Hauptbahnhof is a railway station in the German city of Braunschweig (Brunswick). It is about 1.5 km (0.93 mi) southeast of the city centre and was opened on 1 October 1960, replacing the old passenger station on the southern edge of the old town. Around 66,000 use the station daily for embarking, disembarking and for commuting within the city with public transport. The train services are operated by Deutsche Bahn, Erixx, Metronom and WestfalenBahn.

== History ==
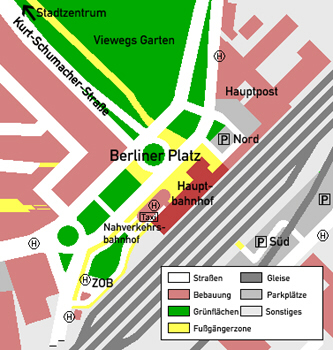
Map of station precinct

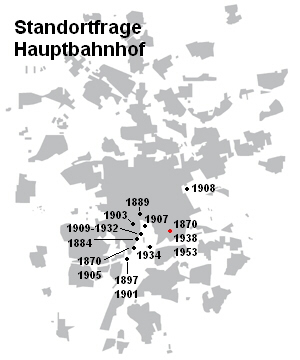
Proposed locations

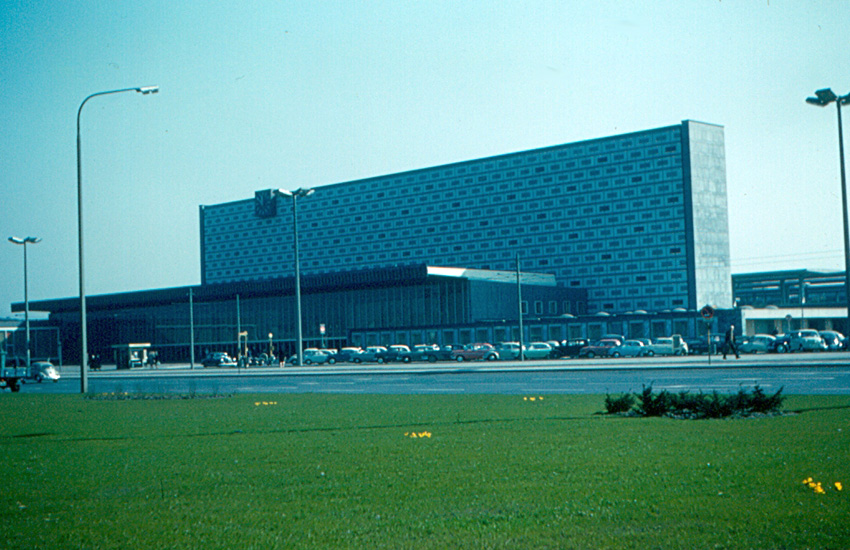
The station shortly after the opening (1961)

Due to the growing traffic of the post-war era, the need of a new main station was urgent. There had long been disadvantages in the construction and location of the old terminal station and it had become out of date. It was decided to build a new through station on the outskirts of the city in the district now called Viewegs Garten.

This was on the grounds above the Braunschweig East station (Ostbahnhof, also called St. Leonhard station, marshalling yard or freight yard). The laying of tracks for the future station began as early as the 1930s. The final location was a compromise, with the cost and area to be demolished to be kept as low as possible.

The first discussions and plans for a new station were made in 1870 in Tappe's plan for the expansion of the city. Even then, the current location was favoured.

Several plans between 1870 and 1934, including Rincklake's plan for the station in 1889, saw a new station in the area of the modern exhibition centre in the vicinity of Eisenbüttel or between Eisenbüttel and the old station. In 1889, a station was proposed at the original site but rotated 180 degrees. An unusual proposal was put forward in 1908 with the future station orientated north–south at the end of today's Jasperallee (to the northeast of the old town). However, this idea received little support as it would have been necessary to cut through an intact residential district.

For years, no agreement was reached. The conversion of the old station into a through station was rejected because it would have cost more than the construction of a new station. The building of a line to a new through station was difficult as the area around the old city of Braunschweig was already heavily developed at the end of the 19th century.

Between 1909 and 1932, there were concrete plans for a new through station in the area of the modern exhibition centre, that is south of the old station. The Kaiser-Wilhelm-Platz would be built just north of the station. A new wide boulevard would be built from the Kaiser-Wilhelm-Platz running north–south to connect the new station to the old town.

In 1938, the plan of 1870 was again revived, detailed planning began and tracks were laid. This work ended with the outbreak of the Second World War. Planning was resumed in the 1950s and in 1953 it was decided to retain the location planned in 1938.

=== Planning ===
Contracts were signed by the City of Braunschweig, Deutsche Bundesbahn and Braunschweigische Staatsbank (Braunschweig state bank) for the through station in 1956. A competition for design concepts for the new central station was advertised in May 1956 and 51 proposals were submitted for the new building. Excavation work for the platform tunnel began on 28 May 1956. The jury announced the result of the architectural competition on 27 June 1956. Two second prizes were awarded to Erwin Dürkop from Hanover and J. Kiesewetter from Bayreuth.

=== Construction ===
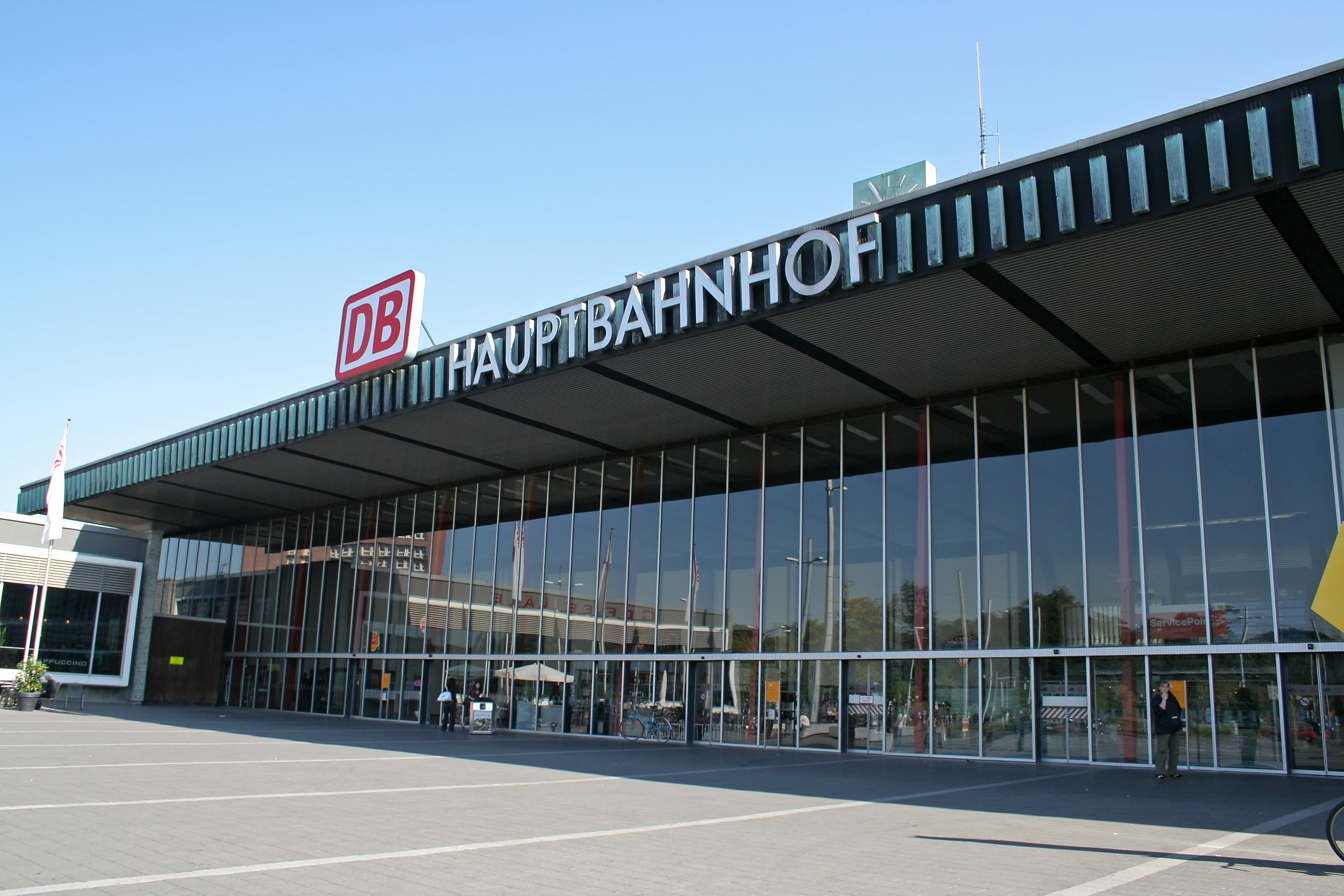
Entrance

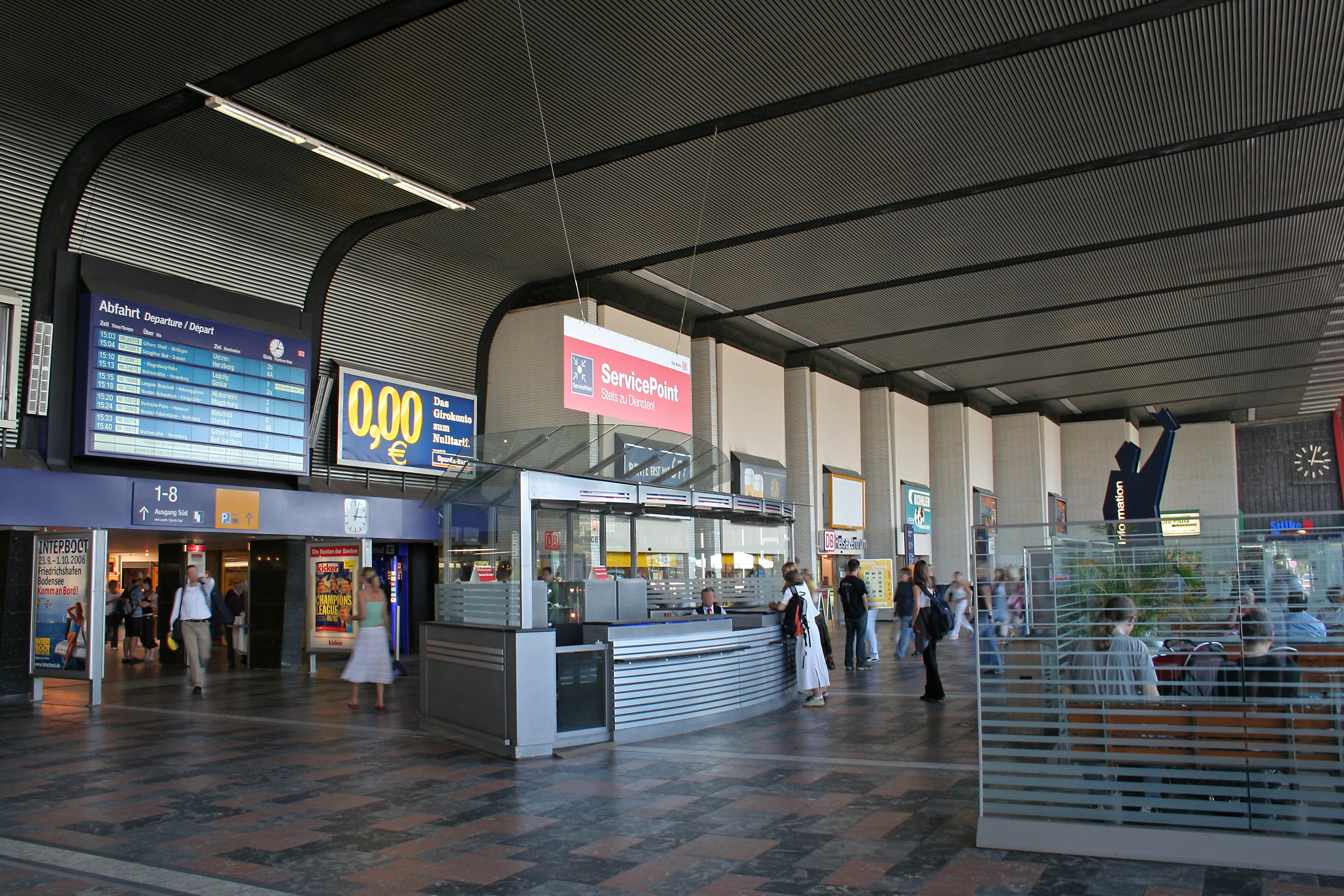
Lobby

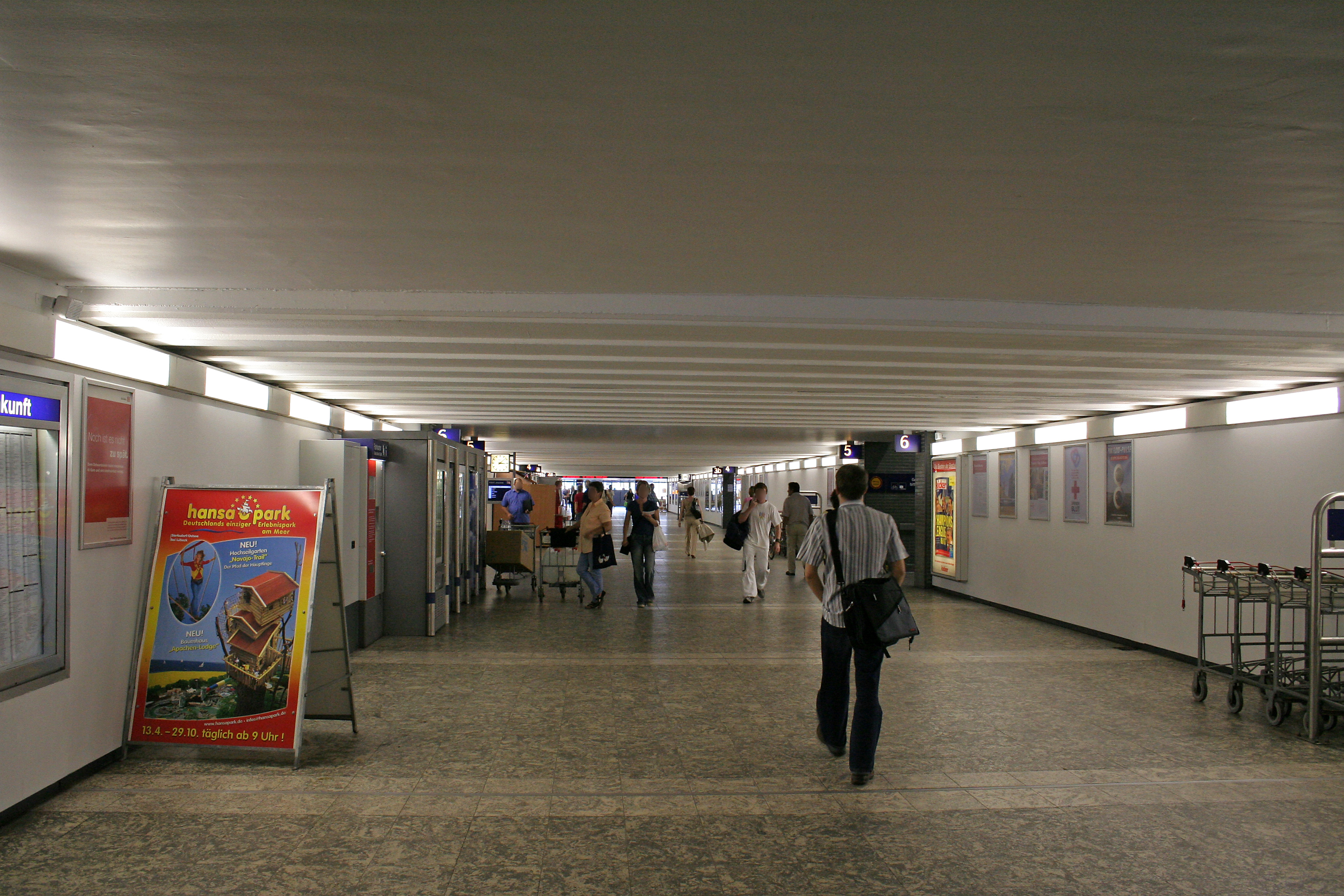
Subway

The first sod for the new building was turned by Hans-Christoph Seebohm, the then Transport Minister, on 19 February 1957. The platform tunnel was completed on 7 November 1958, and its topping-out ceremony was celebrated on 21 November 1958.

The foundation stone was laid for the entrance building on 24 March 1959 and its topping out ceremony was held on 15 October 1959. After three years of construction and ten years of planning the new Braunschweig Hauptbahnhof was opened on 1 October 1960. The station building, including its 29-metre-high (95 ft) and 98-metre-wide (322 ft) office building, was designed by Erwin Dürkop, an architect from Deutsche Bundesbahn's headquarters. It was modelled on Roma Termini station.

The station has been on the Intercity network since 1979 and has been connected to the Intercity-Express network since 1993. In May 1993, a Regional-Express service ran for the first time from Braunschweig to Magdeburg.

The station building has been heritage-listed since 1993.

On 25 and 26 October 2003, a new electronic interlocking was put into operation, which remotely controlled 84 sets of points and 102 signals between Groß Gleidingen and Weddel from the operations centre in Hannover.

=== Environment ===
With the building of the new train station, extensive construction work began nearby. The main objectives were the realisation of the extension of the Wilhelmine ring road system, which was conceived in the 19th century by Ludwig Winter, who planned the construction of a station square (Bahnhofplatz) and a station road (Bahnhofstraße) that would connect the new station with the centre of the city 2 km (1.2 mi) away. In the course of the construction, several houses were demolished. In August 1958, the demolition of the houses began in Heitbergstraße to make way for the new road layout. In February 1960, the demolition of houses followed in Friedrichsplatz. Berliner Platz emerged outside the station and it was rebuilt during the 1960s and 1970s. As part of the relocation of the station, the main post office was moved from the inner city to Berliner Platz.

On 15 June 1970, a pedestrian overpass was completed between the Hauptbahnhof and the Hotel Atrium over the Berliner Platz, together with a tavern. The overpass was demolished in 1999.

In the following years the station district was refurbished. The first section was completed in 1992 and the second in June 2006.

=== Transport terminal ===
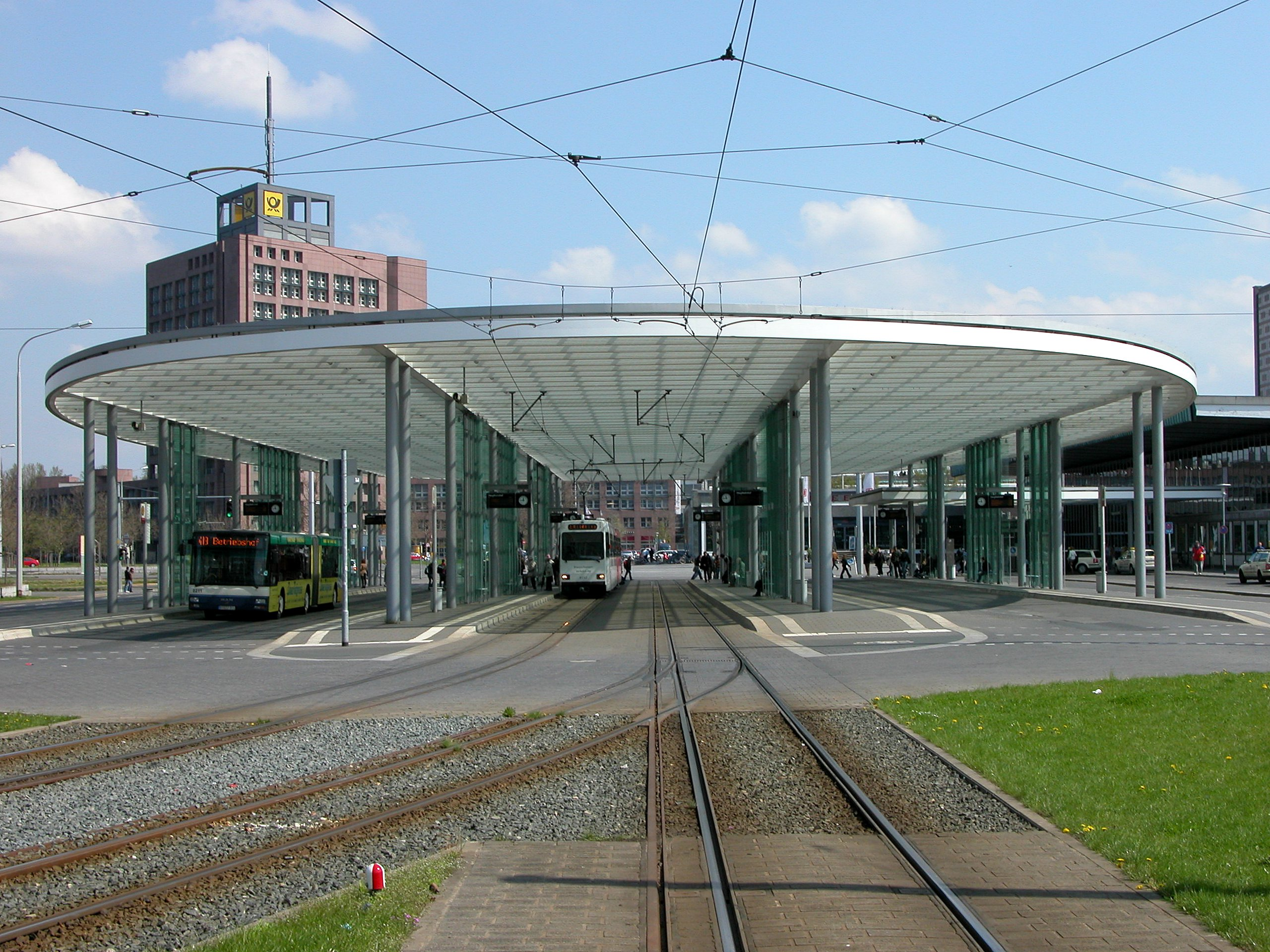
Local transport station with bus and tram in 2006

In 1999 to 2000, in preparation for Expo 2000, a local transport terminal was built in front of the station. The inauguration of the installation, which is protected against the weather with a 100-metre-long (330 ft) canopy, was carried out in May 2000. Simultaneously, the first tracks (with an additional standard gauge rail) were laid for the future standard gauge tramway in the area of the station. In local services, it was proposed that lines 1, 2, 3 and 10 of the RegioStadtBahn (regional light rail) would also serve the station, with work starting in about 2014, although this is in doubt. Its first stage would connect the station and Braunschweig North station (Nordbahnhof) with Salzgitter, Goslar, Bad Harzburg, Schöppenstedt, Gifhorn and Uelzen. The RegioStadtBahn would use two unused platforms in the local station, which as yet have no tracks. The connection to the DB network would take place in the immediate vicinity with an on and off ramp from the embankment. In 2005, a new tram link on the Heinrich-Büssing-Ring was opened to the station. It connects the station with the suburbs of Heidberg, Melverode and Stöckheim in the south of Braunschweig. The new route to Stöckheim was commissioned on 15 October 2006.

== Train services ==
The station is served by the following services:

=== Long-distance ===
Line	Route			Frequency
ICE 10	Hanover → Braunschweig → Wolfsburg → Berlin Hbf → Berlin Ostbahnhof			One train towards Berlin
ICE 10	Cologne – Düsseldorf – Düsseldorf Airport – Duisburg – Essen – Dortmund – Hanover – Braunschweig – Magdeburg – Berlin Hbf – Berlin Ostbahnhof			One train pair
ICE 12	Switzerland – Basel – Freiburg – Karlsruhe – Mannheim – Frankfurt – Kassel – Braunschweig – Wolfsburg – Berlin – Berlin Ostbahnhof			Every 2 hours
ICE 13	Stuttgart –	Heidelberg – Darmstadt –	Frankfurt South – Kassel – Braunschweig – Wolfsburg – Berlin – Berlin Ostbahnhof	Every 2 hours
ICE 13	Karlsruhe –	Heidelberg – Darmstadt –	Frankfurt South – Kassel – Braunschweig – Wolfsburg – Berlin – Berlin Ostbahnhof	Every 2 hours
ICE 13	Frankfurt Airport –		Frankfurt South – Kassel – Braunschweig – Wolfsburg – Berlin – Berlin Ostbahnhof	Every 2 hours
IC 55	Dresden – Riesa – Leipzig – Halle – Magdeburg – Braunschweig – Hanover – Bielefeld – Hamm – Dortmund – Wuppertal – Solingen – Cologne – Bonn – Koblenz – Mainz – Mannheim – Heidelberg – Stuttgart (– Tübingen)			Every 2 hours
IC 56	Leipzig – Halle – Magdeburg – Braunschweig – Hanover – Bremen – Oldenburg – Leer – Emden			Every 2 hours

=== Regional ===
- Regional services RE 50 Hildesheim - Braunschweig - Wolfsburg
- Regional services RE 60 Rheine - Osnabrück - Minden - Hanover - Braunschweig
- Regional services RE 70 Bielefeld - Herford - Minden - Hanover - Braunschweig
- Local services RB 40 Braunschweig - Helmstedt - Magdeburg - Burg
- Local services RB 42 Bad Harzburg - Vienenburg - Wolfenbüttel - Braunschweig
- Local services RB 43 Goslar - Vienenburg - Wolfenbüttel - Braunschweig
- Local services RB 44 Salzgitter - Braunschweig
- Local services RB 45 Braunschweig - Wolfenbüttel - Schöppenstedt
- Local services RB 46 Herzberg - Osterode - Seesen - Salzgitter - Braunschweig
- Local services RB 47 Uelzen - Wittingen - Gifhorn - Braunschweig
- Local services RB 48 Braunschweig - Salzgitter-Thiede - Salzgitter-Lebenstedt

== Traffic connections ==
The station has connections and interchanges with the following lines:

=== Tram ===
- 1: Stöckheim – Hauptbahnhof (main station)– Rathaus (city hall) – Wenden
- 2: Heidberg – Leisewitzstraße – Rathaus – Siegfriedviertel Hauptbahnhof instead of Leisewitzstraße only in the evening and on Sundays
- 5: Hauptbahnhof – Zentrum – Weststadt – Broitzem
- 10: Hauptbahnhof – Rathaus – Rühme Monday-Friday only approx 06:00-19:00

=== Bus ===
- 419 Hauptbahnhof – Ostring – Westring – Messegelände (exhibition centre) – Hauptbahnhof
- 429 Hauptbahnhof – Messegelände – Westring – Ostring – Hauptbahnhof
- 420 Wolfenbüttel Bahnhof – Hauptbahnhof – Rathaus
- 431 Helmstedter Straße – Rautheim – Stöckheim – Melverode – Heidberg – Hauptbahnhof
- 411 Mascherode – Bebelhof – Hauptbahnhof – Rathaus – Lehndorf – Lamme
- 461 Hauptbahnhof – Zentrum – Lehndorf – PTB – Völkenrode
- 601 620 Salzgitter-Lebenstedt – Hauptbahnhof
- 603 631 Salzgitter-Bad – Hauptbahnhof
- 730 Wilhelmstr. – Hauptbahnhof – Sickte – Evessen – Schöppenstedt

== See also ==
- Rail transport in Germany
- Railway stations in Germany
