= List of railway stations in Saxony-Anhalt =

This list covers all passenger railway stations and halts in Saxony-Anhalt that are used by scheduled services.

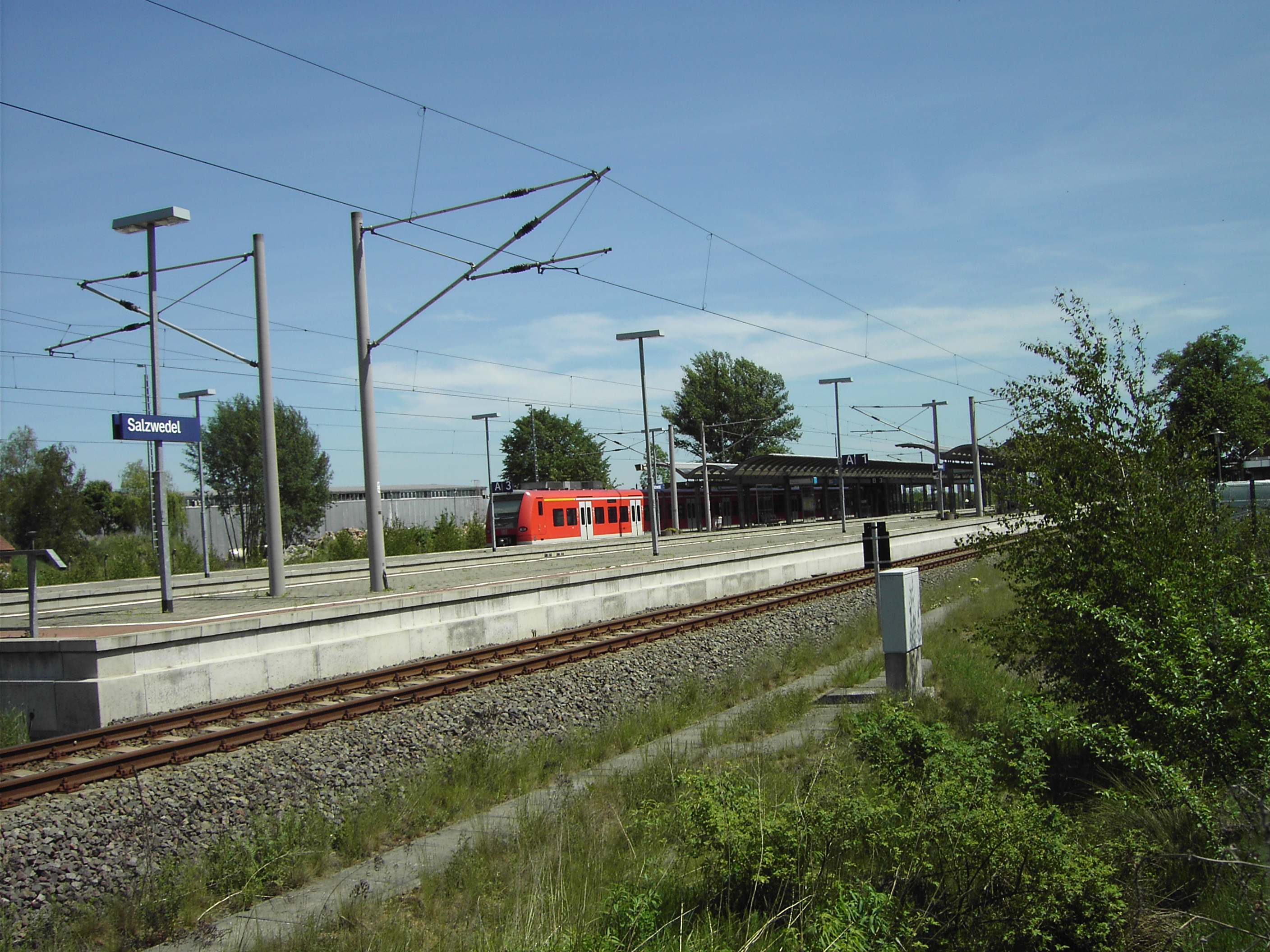
Salzwedel station

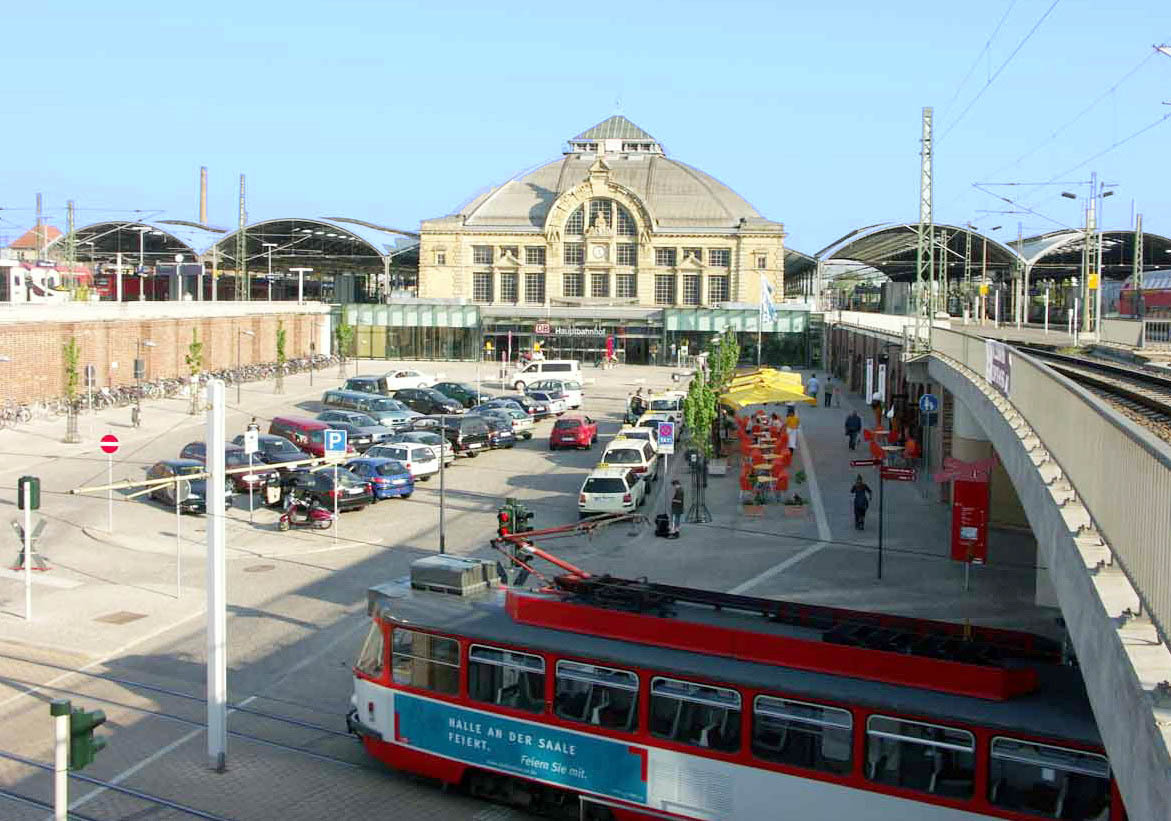
Halle (Saale) Hauptbahnhof

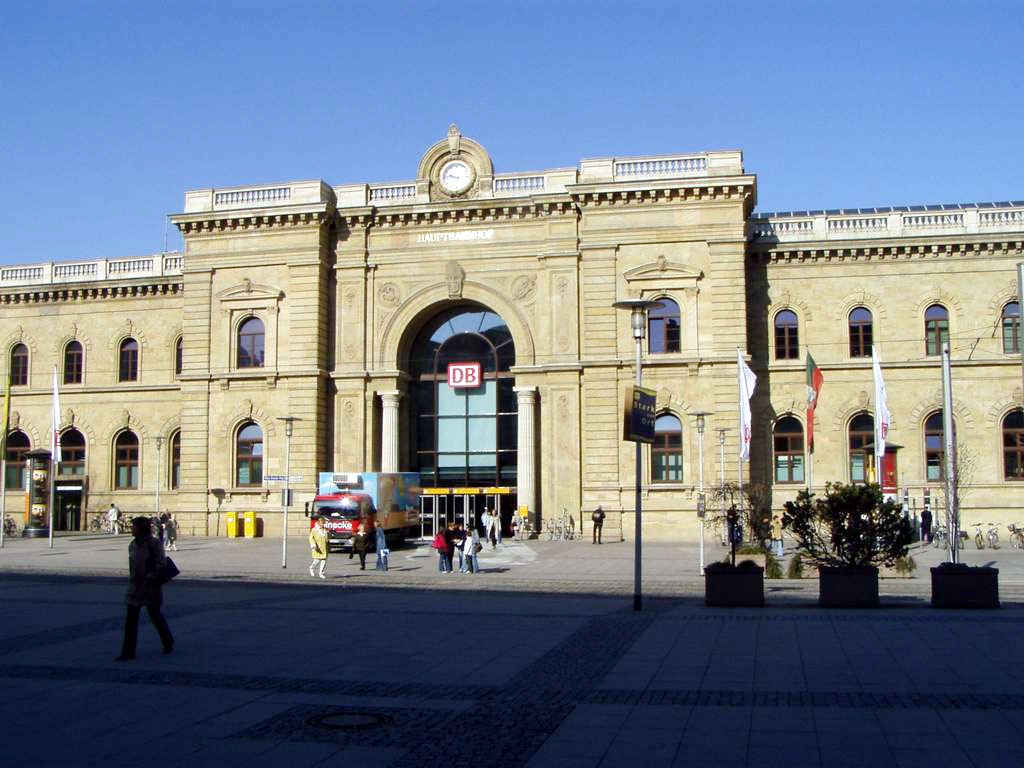
Magdeburg Hauptbahnhof

== Description ==
The list is organised as follows:

- Name: the current name of the station or halt.
- Urban/Rural county (Kreis): This column shows the county in which the station is located. The abbreviations used correspond to those used for German car number plates. The individual counties in Saxony-Anhalt are:
- ABI = Landkreis Anhalt-Bitterfeld
- BK = Landkreis Börde
- BLK = Burgenlandkreis
- HZ = Landkreis Harz
- JL = Landkreis Jerichower Land
- MSH = Landkreis Mansfeld-Südharz
- SAW = Altmarkkreis Salzwedel
- SDL = Landkreis Stendal
- SK = Saalekreis
- SLK = Salzlandkreis
- WB = Landkreis Wittenberg
- DE = Dessau-Roßlau
- HAL = Halle (Saale)
- MD = Magdeburg

Railway Operator (Transport Association)

This specifies the name of the Transport Association (Verkehrsverbund). The Verkehrs- und Tarifgemeinschaft Ostharz ("Transport and Fare Community of the East Harz") is active in the Harz, but only for bus and tram operations.

- The MDV (Mitteldeutscher Verkehrsverbund, "Central German Transport Association") cover the Leipzig-Halle Region and crosses the state border into Saxony.
- marego (Magdeburger Regionalverkehrsverbund, "Magdeburg Regional Transport Association") covers the north of Saxony-Anhalt. Its boundaries are in the north is the state border, in the southwest it is at Oschersleben, in the south it is at Könnern and in the east it is at Loburg.

Category

The category shows the status at 1 January 2012 and only applies to stations operated by DB Station&Service AG.

Train type

The next five columns show which types of train stop at the station. The abbreviations are those used by the DB AG but apply to similar train types of other operators:

- ICE = Intercity-Express
- IC = Intercity
- EC = Eurocity
- FLX = Flixtrain
- RE = Regionalexpress
- RB = Regionalbahn
- S = S-Bahn

Line

This column gives the railway line on which the station is situated.

Remarks

In this column additional information is supplied, particularly with regard to the operators and seasonal services.

== Station overview (standard gauge) ==
Station	City/ District (Kreis)	Railway operator	Cat	ICE	IC	RE	RB	S	Line	Remarks
Amsdorf	MSH		6				X		Halle (Saale)–Kassel	
Angern-Rogätz	BK	marego	6				X			
Angersdorf	SK	MDV	6				X		Halle (Saale)–Kassel; Merseburg–Halle-Nietleben	
Annaburg	WB		6				X		Roßlau–Falkenberg/Elster	
Arensdorf (b Köthen)	ABI		6				X		Magdeburg–Leipzig	
Aschersleben Pbf	SLK	marego	5			X	X		Halle–Halberstadt; Köthen–Aschersleben	
Baalberge	SLK	marego	6				X		Köthen–Aschersleben	
Bad Dürrenberg	SK	MDV	6				X		Leipzig–Großkorbetha	
Bad Kösen	BLK	MDV	5				X		Halle–Bebra railway	
Bad Lauchstädt	SK	MDV	6				X		Merseburg–Halle-Nietleben	
Bad Lauchstädt West	SK	MDV	6				X			Operations station
Bad Schmiedeberg	WB						X		Pretzsch–Eilenburg	Does not belong to DB, only served on summer weekends, currently served by buses
Bad Schmiedeberg Nord	WB								Pretzsch–Eilenburg	Does not belong to DB, formerly Splau, only served on summer weekends, currently served by buses
Bad Schmiedeberg Süd	WB								Pretzsch–Eilenburg	Does not belong to DB; formerly Moschwig
Balgstädt	BLK	MDV	6				X		Unstrut Railway	Operations station
Barleben	BK	marego	6				X		Oebisfelde–Magdeburg	
Barleber See	MD	marego	6				X	X		Only May–September
Bebitz	SLK	marego	6				X			
Belleben	SLK	marego	6				X		Halle–Halberstadt	
Bennungen	MSH		6			X	X		Halle (Saale)–Kassel	
Berga-Kelbra	MSH		6			X	X		Halle (Saale)–Kassel; Berga-Kelbra–Stolberg (Harz)	
Bergwitz	WB		6				X		Berlin–Halle; Bergwitz–Kemberg	
Bernburg	SLK	marego	5				X		Köthen–Aschersleben	
Bernburg-Friedenshall	SLK	marego	6				X		Köthen–Aschersleben	
Bernburg-Strenzfeld	SLK	marego	6				X			Operations station
Bernburg-Waldau HP	SLK	marego	6				X		Köthen–Aschersleben	
Beuna (Geiseltal)	SK	MDV	6				X			Operations station
Beyendorf	MD	marego	6				X		Magdeburg–Thale	
Biederitz	JL	marego	5			X	X		Biederitz–Trebnitz	
Biendorf	SLK	marego	6				X		Köthen–Aschersleben	
Biesenrode	MSH		6				X		Klostermansfeld–Wippra	
Bindfelde	SDL		6				X		Stendal–Tangermünde	Operations station
Bitterfeld	ABI		3	X	X	X	X		Berlin–Halle; Dessau–Leipzig; Bitterfeld–Stumsdorf	
Blankenburg (Harz)	HZ		6			X	X		Halberstadt–Blankenburg; Rübeland Railway	
Blankenheim (Kr Sangerhausen)	MSH		6			X	X		Halle (Saale)–Kassel	
Blumenberg	BK	marego	6				X		Magdeburg–Thale; Schönebeck (Elbe)–Blumenberg	
Börnecke (Harz)	SLK	marego	6			X	X		Halberstadt–Blankenburg	Operations station
Bornitz (b Zeitz)	BLK	MDV	6				X		Leipzig–Gera	Operations station
Bösdorf (Sachs-Anh)	BK	marego	6				X		Oebisfelde–Magdeburg	
Braunsbedra	SK	MDV	6				X			
Braunsbedra Ost	SK	MDV	6				X			Operations station
Brehna	ABI		6				X		Berlin–Halle	
Brunau-Packebusch	SAW		6				X		Stendal–Uelzen	
Büden	JL	marego	6				X			
Bülzig	WB		6			X			Berlin–Halle	
Buna Werke	SK	MDV	6				X		Merseburg–Halle-Nietleben	
Burg (b Magdeburg)	JL	marego	5			X	X			
Burgkemnitz	ABI		6				X		Berlin–Halle	
Calbe (Saale) Ost	SLK	marego	5				X		Magdeburg–Leipzig	
Calbe (Saale) West	SLK	marego	6				X		Berlin–Blankenheim	
Coswig (Anh)	WB		6			X	X		Węgliniec–Roßlau	
Darlingerode	HZ		6				X		Heudeber-Danstedt–Bad Harzburg	
Demker	SDL		6				X			
Dessau Hbf	DE		3			X	X		Dessau–Leipzig; Trebnitz–Dessau; Dessau–Wörlitz; Köthen–Dessau	
Dessau Süd	DE		6				X		Dessau–Leipzig	
Dessau-Adria	DE								Dessau–Wörlitz	Does not belong to DB
Dessau-Alten	DE		6				X			
Dessauer Brücke	HAL	MDV	5					X		
Dessau-Mosigkau	DE		6				X			
Deuben (b Zeitz)	BLK	MDV	6				X		Großkorbetha–Deuben; Weißenfels–Zeitz	
Dieskau	SK	MDV	5					X	Magdeburg–Leipzig	
Ditfurt	HZ		6			X	X		Magdeburg–Thale	
Dodendorf	BK	marego	6				X		Magdeburg–Thale	
Domnitz (SaalKr)	SK	MDV	6				X		Halle–Halberstadt	
Dreileben-Drackenstedt	BK	marego	6				X		Eilsleben–Magdeburg	
Drohndorf-Mehringen	SLK	marego	6				X		Halle–Halberstadt	
Eggersdorf	SLK	marego	6				X		Schönebeck–Güsten	
Eichstedt (Altm)	SDL		6				X			
Eickendorf	SLK	marego	6				X		Schönebeck–Güsten	
Eilsleben (b Magdeburg)	BK	marego	6				X		Helmstedt–Eilsleben; Eilsleben–Schöningen; Haldensleben–Eilsleben	
Elsnigk (Anh)	ABI		6				X			
Elster (Elbe)	WB		6				X		Węgliniec–Roßlau	
Erdeborn	MSH		6				X		Halle (Saale)–Kassel	
Eutzsch	WB								Pratau–Pretzsch–Torgau	Does not belong to DB, currently only served by buses
Flechtingen	BK	marego	6				X		Oebisfelde–Magdeburg	
Fleetmark	SAW		6				X		Stendal–Uelzen	
Förderstedt	SLK	marego	6				X		Schönebeck–Güsten	
Frankleben	SK	MDV	6				X			
Freckleben	SLK	marego	6				X		Halle–Halberstadt	
Frenz	ABI		6				X		Köthen–Aschersleben	
Freyburg (Unstrut)	BLK	MDV	6				X		Unstrut Railway	
Friesdorf	MSH		6				X		Klostermansfeld–Wippra	Operations station
Friesdorf Ost	MSH		6				X		Klostermansfeld–Wippra	Operations station
Frose	SLK	marego	6				X		Halle–Halberstadt	
Gardelegen	SAW		6				X		Oebisfelde–Lehrte	
Gatersleben	SLK	marego	6			X	X		Halle–Halberstadt	
Geestgottberg	SDL		6				X			
Genthin	JL	marego	5			X	X		Genthin–Schönhausen	
Gerwisch	JL	marego	6				X			
Giersleben	SLK	marego	6				X		Köthen–Aschersleben	
Globig	WB								Pratau–Pretzsch–Torgau	Does not belong to DB currently only served by buses
Gnadau	SLK	marego	6				X		Magdeburg–Leipzig	
Goldbeck (Kr Osterburg)	SDL		6				X			
Gommern	JL	marego	6			X	X		Biederitz–Trebnitz	
Gräfenhainichen	WB		6				X		Berlin–Halle	
Gräfenstuhl-Klippmühle	MSH		6				X		Klostermansfeld–Wippra	
Greppin	ABI		6				X		Dessau–Leipzig	
Griebo	WB		6				X		Węgliniec–Roßlau	
Gröbers	SK	MDV	5					X	Magdeburg–Leipzig	
Groß Ammensleben	BK	marego	6				X		Oebisfelde–Magdeburg	
Groß Gräfendorf	SK		6				X			
Groß Quenstedt	HZ		6				X		Magdeburg–Thale	
Großkorbetha	BLK	MDV	5				X		Halle–Bebra railway Leipzig–Großkorbetha; Großkorbetha–Deuben	
Großkugel	SK	MDV	5					X	Magdeburg–Leipzig	
Güsen (Kr Genthin)	JL	marego	6			X			Güsen–Jerichow; Köthen–Aschersleben	
Güsten	SLK		5			X	X		Berlin–Blankenheim; Schönebeck–Güsten	
Güterglück	ABI		6				X		Biederitz–Trebnitz	
Hadmersleben	BK	marego	6				X		Magdeburg–Thale	
Halberstadt	HZ		3			X	X		Magdeburg–Thale; Halle–Halberstadt; Halberstadt–Vienenburg; Halberstadt–Blankenburg	
Halberstadt Oststraße	HZ		6			X	X		Halberstadt–Blankenburg	Operations station
Halberstadt-Spiegelsberge	HZ		6			X	X		Halberstadt–Blankenburg	
Haldensleben	BK	marego	5				X		Oebisfelde–Magdeburg; Haldensleben–Eilsleben	
Halle (Saale) Hbf	HAL	MDV	2	X	X	X	X	X	Halle–Halberstadt; Halle–Cottbus; Berlin–Halle; Magdeburg–Leipzig; Halle–Bebra railway Halle (Saale)–Kassel; Erfurt–Leipzig/Halle	
Halle Messe	HAL	MDV	5					X		
Halle-Ammendorf	HAL	MDV	6				X		Halle–Bebra railway	
Halle-Neustadt	HAL	MDV	5					X	Merseburg–Halle-Nietleben	
Halle-Nietleben	HAL	MDV	5					X	Merseburg–Halle-Nietleben	
Halle-Rosengarten	HAL	MDV					X	X	Halle (Saale)–Kassel	Does not belong to DB
Halle-Silberhöhe	HAL	MDV					X	X	Halle (Saale)–Kassel	Does not belong to DB
Halle-Südstadt	HAL	MDV					X	X	Halle (Saale)–Kassel	Does not belong to DB
Halle-Trotha	HAL	MDV	5				X	X	Halle–Halberstadt	
Hämerten	SDL		6				X		Oebisfelde–Lehrte	
Haynsburg	BLK	MDV	6				X		Leipzig–Gera	
Hedersleben-Wedderstedt	HZ		6				X		Halle–Halberstadt	
Helbra	MSH						X		Berlin–Blankenheim	Does not belong to DB, operated only seasonally
Hettstedt	MSH		6			X			Berlin–Blankenheim	
Heudeber-Danstedt	HZ		6				X		Halberstadt–Vienenburg; Heudeber-Danstedt–Bad Harzburg	
Hohenturm	SK	MDV	6				X		Berlin–Halle	
Hohenwulsch	SDL		6				X		Stendal–Uelzen	
Holzdorf	WB	VBB	6			X			Jüterbog–Falkenberg (Elster)	
Hordorf	BK	marego	6				X		Magdeburg–Thale	
Ilberstedt	SLK		6				X		Köthen–Aschersleben	
Ilsenburg	HZ		6			X	X		Heudeber-Danstedt–Bad Harzburg	
Jävenitz	SAW		6				X		Oebisfelde–Lehrte	
Jeber-Bergfrieden	WB		6			X			Wiesenburg–Roßlau	
Jessen (Elster)	WB		6				X		Węgliniec–Roßlau	
Jeßnitz (Anh)	ABI		6				X		Dessau–Leipzig	
Jütrichau	ABI		6				X		Trebnitz–Dessau	
Kapen									Dessau–Wörlitz	Does not belong to DB currently no services
Karsdorf	BLK	MDV	6				X		Unstrut Railway	
Kirchscheidungen	BLK	MDV	6				X		Unstrut Railway	
Kläden (Kr Stendal)	SDL		6				X		Stendal–Uelzen	
Klebitz	WB		6				X		Berlin–Halle; Unstrut Railway	
Kleinjena	BLK	MDV	6				X			Operations station
Klieken	WB		6				X		Węgliniec–Roßlau	
Klostermansfeld	MSH		6			X	X		Berlin–Blankenheim; Klostermansfeld–Wippra	
Klostermansfeld EKZ	MSH								Klostermansfeld–Wippra	
Klostermansfeld Randsiedlung	MSH		6				X		Klostermansfeld–Wippra	Operations station
Königsborn	JL	marego	6			X	X		Biederitz–Trebnitz	
Könnern	SLK		5			X	X		Halle–Halberstadt	
Köthen	ABI		3	X	X		X		Magdeburg–Leipzig; Köthen–Aken; Köthen–Aschersleben	
Kötzschau	SK	MDV	6				X		Leipzig–Großkorbetha	
Krauschwitz (b Teuchern)	BLK	MDV	6				X		Naumburg–Teuchern	Operations station
Krottorf	BK	marego	6				X		Magdeburg–Thale	
Krumpa	SK		6				X			
Landsberg (b Halle/Saale)	SK		6				X		Berlin–Halle	
Landsberg (b Halle/Saale) Süd	SK		6				X		Halle–Cottbus	
Langendorf	BLK	MDV	6				X		Weißenfels–Zeitz	
Langeneichstädt	SK	MDV	6				X			
Langenstein	HZ		6			X	X		Halberstadt–Blankenburg	
Langenweddingen	BK	marego	6				X		Magdeburg–Thale	
Laucha (Unstrut)	BLK	MDV	6				X		Unstrut Railway; Laucha–Kölleda	
Leißling	BLK	MDV	6				X		Halle–Bebra railway	
Leuna Werke Nord	SK	MDV	6				X		Halle–Bebra railway	
Leuna Werke Süd	SK	MDV	6				X		Halle–Bebra railway	
Linda (Elster)	WB	VBB	6			X			Jüterbog–Falkenberg (Elster)	
Loburg	JL	marego	6				X			
Lübs (b Magdeburg)	JL	marego	6			X	X		Biederitz–Trebnitz	
Luckenau	BLK	MDV	6				X		Weißenfels–Zeitz	
Lutherstadt Eisleben	MSH		5		X	X	X		Halle (Saale)–Kassel	
Lutherstadt Wittenberg Hbf	WB		3	X	X	X	X		Berlin–Halle; Węgliniec–Roßlau	
Lutherstadt Wittenberg Altstadt	WB		6			X	X		Węgliniec–Roßlau	
Lutherstadt Wittenberg West	WB		6			X	X		Węgliniec–Roßlau	
Lutherstadt Wittenberg-Labetz	WB		6				X		Węgliniec–Roßlau	
Lutherstadt Wittenberg-Priesteritz	WB		6				X		Węgliniec–Roßlau	
Magdeburg Hbf	MD	marego	2	X	X	X	X	X	Magdeburg–Thale; Magdeburg–Leipzig; Oebisfelde–Magdeburg; Eilsleben–Magdeburg	
Magdeburg SKET Industriepark	MD	marego	5				X	X	Magdeburg–Thale; Magdeburg–Leipzig	Before 2009: Magdeburg Thälmannwerk
Magdeburg Südost	MD	marego	5				X	X	Magdeburg–Leipzig	
Magdeburg-Buckau	MD	marego	5				X	X	Magdeburg–Thale; Magdeburg–Leipzig	
Magdeburg-Eichenweiler	MD	marego	5				X	X	Oebisfelde–Magdeburg	
Magdeburg-Hasselbachplatz	MD	marego	5				X	X	Magdeburg–Leipzig	
Magdeburg-Herrenkrug	MD	marego	5			X	X			
Magdeburg-Neustadt	MD	marego	5			X	X	X	Oebisfelde–Magdeburg; Eilsleben–Magdeburg	
Magdeburg-Rothensee	MD	marego	5				X	X	Oebisfelde–Magdeburg	
Magdeburg-Salbke	MD	marego	5				X	X	Magdeburg–Leipzig	
Magdeburg-Sudenburg	MD	marego	5				X		Eilsleben–Magdeburg	
Mahlwinkel	BK	marego	6				X			
Mansfeld (Südharz)	MSH		6				X		Klostermansfeld–Wippra	Operations station
Marienborn	BK	marego	6				X		Helmstedt–Eilsleben	
Marke	ABI		6				X		Dessau–Leipzig	
Meinsdorf	DE		6				X		Węgliniec–Roßlau; Wiesenburg–Roßlau	
Meitzendorf	BK	marego	6				X		Oebisfelde–Magdeburg	
Merseburg	SK	MDV	4				X		Halle–Bebra railway Merseburg–Leipzig; Merseburg–Halle-Nietleben	
Merseburg Bergmannsring	SK	MDV	6				X			Operations station
Merseburg Elisabethhöhe	SK	MDV	6				X		Merseburg–Halle-Nietleben	
Mertendorf	BLK	MDV	6				X		Naumburg–Teuchern	Operations station
Meßdorf	SDL		6				X		Stendal–Uelzen	
Mieste	SAW		6				X		Oebisfelde–Lehrte	
Miesterhorst	SAW		6				X		Oebisfelde–Lehrte	
Miltern	SDL		6				X		Stendal–Tangermünde	Operations station
Milzau	SK	MDV	6				X		Merseburg–Halle-Nietleben	
Möckern (b Magdeburg)	JL	marego	6				X			Operations station
Möringen (Altm)	SDL		6				X			
Möser	JL	marego	6				X			
Mücheln (Geiseltal)	SK	MDV	6				X			Operations station
Mücheln (Geiseltal) - Stadt	SK	MDV	6				X			
Mühlanger	WB		6				X		Węgliniec–Roßlau	
Muldenstein	ABI		6				X		Berlin–Halle	
Nachterstedt-Hoym	SLK	marego	6				X		Halle–Halberstadt	
Nauendorf	SK	MDV	6				X		Halle–Halberstadt	
Naumburg (Saale) Hbf	BLK	MDV	3	X	X		X		Halle–Bebra railway Naumburg–Teuchern; Unstrut Railway	
Naumburg (Saale) Ost	BLK	MDV	6				X		Naumburg–Teuchern	
Nebra	BLK	MDV	6				X		Unstrut Railway	
Neinstedt	HZ		6			X	X		Magdeburg–Thale	
Neundorf (Anh)	SLK		6				X		Schönebeck–Güsten	
Niederndodeleben	BK	marego	6				X		Eilsleben–Magdeburg	
Niemberg	SK	MDV	6				X		Magdeburg–Leipzig	
Nienburg (Saale)	SLK	marego	6				X			
Nienhagen (b Halberstadt)	HZ		6				X		Magdeburg–Thale	
Oberröblingen (Helme)	MSH		6			X	X		Sangerhausen–Erfurt	
Ochtmersleben	BK	marego	6				X		Eilsleben–Magdeburg	
Oebisfelde	BK	marego	5				X		Oebisfelde–Magdeburg; Oebisfelde–Lehrte; Oebisfelde–Stendal	
Oranienbaum	WB								Dessau–Wörlitz	Does not belong to DB, currently no services
Oschersleben (Bode)	BK	marego	6			X	X		Magdeburg–Thale	
Osterburg	SDL		6				X			
Osternienburg	ABI		6				X			
Osterweddingen	BK	marego	6				X		Magdeburg–Thale	
Ovelgünne	BK	marego	6				X		Eilsleben–Magdeburg	
Peißen	SK	MDV	6				X		Halle–Cottbus	
Petersroda	ABI		6				X		Dessau–Leipzig	
Pratau	WB		6				X		Berlin–Halle; Pratau–Pretzsch–Torgau	
Pretzier (Altm)	SAW		6				X		Stendal–Uelzen	
Pretzsch	WB								Pratau–Pretzsch–Torgau; Pretzsch–Eilenburg	Does not belong to DB, currently served by buses
Prittitz			6				X		Weißenfels–Zeitz	
Prödel	JL	marego	6				X		Biederitz–Trebnitz	
Profen	BLK	MDV	6				X		Leipzig–Gera	
Quedlinburg	HZ		5			X	X		Magdeburg–Thale; Selke Valley Railway	
Querfurt	SK	MDV	6				X			
Rackith	WB								Pratau–Pretzsch–Torgau	Does not belong to DB, currently served by buses
Rackith Süd	WB								Pratau–Pretzsch–Torgau	Does not belong to DB
Radis	WB		6				X		Berlin–Halle	
Raguhn	ABI		6				X		Dessau–Leipzig	
Rätzlingen	BK	marego	6				X		Oebisfelde–Magdeburg	
Reuden (Kr Zeitz)	BLK		6				X		Leipzig–Gera	Operations station
Reußen	BLK	MDV	6				X		Halle–Cottbus	
Riestedt	MSH		6				X		Halle (Saale)–Kassel	
Röblingen am See	MSH	MDV	5			X	X		Halle (Saale)–Kassel	
Rodleben	DE		6			X	X		Trebnitz–Dessau	
Roitzsch (Kr Bitterfeld)	ABI	MDV	6				X		Berlin–Halle	
Rosengarten	HAL	MDV	5					X		
Roßla	MSH		6				X		Halle (Saale)–Kassel	
Roßlau (Elbe)	DE		5			X	X		Węgliniec–Roßlau; Trebnitz–Dessau; Wiesenburg–Roßlau	
Rottleberode	MSH		6				X		Berga-Kelbra–Stolberg (Harz)	Operations station
Sachsendorf (b Calbe)	SLK	marego	6				X		Magdeburg–Leipzig	
Salzwedel	SAW		4		X	X	X		Stendal–Uelzen	
Sandersleben (Anh)	MSH	marego	4			X	X		Halle–Halberstadt; Berlin–Blankenheim	
Sangerhausen	MSH		5		X	X	X		Halle (Saale)–Kassel; Sangerhausen–Erfurt	
Schafstädt	SK	MDV	6				X			
Scheiplitz	BLK	MDV							Naumburg–Teuchern	
Schierstedt	SLK	marego	6				X		Köthen–Aschersleben	
Schkopau	SK	MDV	6				X		Halle–Bebra railway	
Schönebeck (Elbe)	SLK	marego	5			X	X	X	Magdeburg–Leipzig; Schönebeck–Güsten; Schönebeck (Elbe)–Blumenberg	
Schönebeck (Elbe) Süd	SLK	marego	5				X	X	Schönebeck–Güsten	
Schönebeck-Felgeleben	SLK	marego	6				X		Magdeburg–Leipzig	
Schönebeck-Frohse	SLK	marego	5				X	X	Magdeburg–Leipzig	
Schönebeck-Salzelmen	SLK	marego	5				X	X	Schönebeck–Güsten	
Schönhausen (Elbe)	SDL		6				X		Oebisfelde–Lehrte; Genthin–Schönhausen	
Seehausen (Altm)	SDL		6				X			
Silberhöhe	HAL	MDV	5					X		
Solpke	SAW		6				X		Oebisfelde–Lehrte	
Stapelburg	HZ		6				X		Ilsenburg–Vienenburg	
Staßfurt	SLK	marego	6			X	X		Schönebeck–Güsten	
Steinfeld (b Stendal)	SDL		6				X		Stendal–Uelzen	
Steintorbrücke	HAL	MDV	5					X		
Stendal	SDL		3	X	X	X	X		Oebisfelde–Lehrte; Stendal–Uelzen; Stendal–Tangermünde	
Stendal Vorbf	SDL		6				X		Stendal–Tangermünde	
Stendal-Stadtsee	SDL		6				X			
Stolberg (Harz)	MSH		6			X	X		Berga-Kelbra–Stolberg (Harz)	
Stößen	BLK	MDV	6				X		Naumburg–Teuchern	
Stumsdorf	ABI		6				X		Magdeburg–Leipzig; Bitterfeld–Stumsdorf	
Südstadt	HAL	MDV	5					X		
Tangerhütte	SDL	marego	5			X	X			
Tangermünde	SDL		6				X		Stendal–Tangermünde	
Tangermünde West	SDL		6				X		Stendal–Tangermünde	Operations station
Teicha	SK	MDV	6				X		Halle–Halberstadt	
Teuchern	BLK	MDV	6				X		Weißenfels–Zeitz; Naumburg–Teuchern	
Teutschenthal	SK	MDV	6				X			
Teutschenthal Ost	SK	MDV	6				X		Halle (Saale)–Kassel	
Thale Hbf	HZ		6			X	X		Magdeburg–Thale	
Thale Musestieg	HZ		6			X	X		Magdeburg–Thale	
Theißen	BLK	MDV	6				X		Weißenfels–Zeitz	
Thießen	WB		6			X			Wiesenburg–Roßlau	
Trebitz (b Könnern)	SLK	marego	6				X			Operations station
Tromsdorf	BLK	MDV	6				X			
Uchtspringe	SDL		6				X		Oebisfelde–Lehrte	
Uftrungen	MSH		6				X		Berga-Kelbra–Stolberg (Harz)	Operations station
Vahldorf	BK	marego	6				X		Oebisfelde–Magdeburg	
Vatterode	MSH		6				X		Klostermansfeld–Wippra	Operations station
Vatteröder Teich	MSH		6				X		Klostermansfeld–Wippra	Operations station
Vinzelberg	SDL		6				X		Oebisfelde–Lehrte	
Vitzenburg	SK		6				X		Unstrut Railway	
Wahlitz	JL	marego	6			X	X		Biederitz–Trebnitz	
Wallhausen (Helme)	MSH		6				X		Halle (Saale)–Kassel	
Wallwitz (Saalkr)	SK	MDV	6				X		Halle–Halberstadt	
Wangen	BLK	MDV					X		Unstrut Railway	Does not belong to DB
Wansleben am See	MSH		6				X		Halle (Saale)–Kassel	
Wefensleben	BK	marego	6				X		Helmstedt–Eilsleben	
Wegeleben	HZ		5			X	X		Magdeburg–Thale; Halle–Halberstadt	
Wegenstedt	BK	marego	6				X		Oebisfelde–Magdeburg	
Weißandt-Gölzau	ABI		6				X		Magdeburg–Leipzig	
Weißenfels	BLK	MDV	3		X		X		Halle–Bebra railway Weißenfels–Zeitz	
Weißenfels West	BLK	MDV	6				X		Weißenfels–Zeitz	
Wellen (b Magdeburg)	BK	marego	6				X		Eilsleben–Magdeburg	
Wernigerode	HZ		6			X	X		Heudeber-Danstedt–Bad Harzburg	
Wernigerode Elmowerk	HZ		6				X		Heudeber-Danstedt–Bad Harzburg	
Wethau	BLK	MDV	6				X		Naumburg–Teuchern	Operations station
Wetterzeube	BLK	MDV	6				X		Leipzig–Gera	
Wippra	MSH		6				X		Klostermansfeld–Wippra	
Wohnstadt Nord	HAL	MDV	5					X		
Wolfen (Kr Bitterfeld)	ABI		5			X	X		Dessau–Leipzig	
Wolferode	MSH		6				X		Halle (Saale)–Kassel	
Wolmirstedt	BK	marego	5				X	X		
Woltersdorf (b Magdeburg)	JL	marego	6				X			Operations station
Wörlitz	WB						X		Dessau–Wörlitz	Does not belong to DB summer only
Wulfen (Anh)	ABI		6				X		Magdeburg–Leipzig	
Zahna	WB		6			X			Berlin–Halle	
Zeddenick (Sachs-Anh)	JL	marego	6				X			Operations station
Zeitz	BLK	MDV	5			X	X		Weißenfels–Zeitz; Leipzig–Gera	
Zeppernick (b Magdeburg)	JL	marego	6				X			Operations station
Zerbst	ABI		5			X	X		Trebnitz–Dessau	
Zielitz	BK	marego	6					X		
Zielitz Ort	BK	marego	6				X	X		
Ziepel	JL	marego	6				X			
Zöberitz	SK		6				X		Magdeburg–Leipzig	
Zoo	HAL	MDV	5					X		
Zörnigall	WB		6			X			Berlin–Halle	
Zscherben	SK	MDV	6				X		Halle (Saale)–Kassel	
Zscherbener Straße	HAL	MDV	5					X	Merseburg–Halle-Nietleben	

== Stations on the Harz narrow-gauge lines ==
Station	District / city	Harz Railway	Selke Valley Railway	Brocken Railway	Deutsche Bahn	Line	Remarks
Albrechtshaus	HZ		X			Quedlinburg–Hasselfelde	Operations station
Alexisbad	HZ		X			Quedlinburg–Hasselfelde, Alexisbad–Harzgerode	
Bad Suderode	HZ		X			Quedlinburg–Hasselfelde	
Benneckenstein	HZ	X				Nordhausen–Wernigerode	
Birkenmoor	HZ		X			Stiege–Eisfelder Talmühle	Operations station
Brocken	HZ			X		Drei Annen Hohne–Brocken	
Drahtzug	HZ		X			Quedlinburg–Hasselfelde	Operations station
Drei-Annen-Hohne	HZ	X		X		Nordhausen–Wernigerode, Drei Annen Hohne–Brocken	
Elend	HZ	X				Nordhausen–Wernigerode	
Friedrichshöhe	HZ		X			Quedlinburg–Hasselfelde	Operations station
Gernrode	HZ		X			Quedlinburg–Hasselfelde	
Güntersberge	HZ		X			Quedlinburg–Hasselfelde	
Hasselfelde	HZ		X			Quedlinburg–Hasselfelde	
Harzgerode	HZ		X			Alexisbad–Harzgerode	
Mägdesprung	HZ		X			Quedlinburg–Hasselfelde	
Osterteich	HZ		X			Quedlinburg–Hasselfelde	Operations station
Quedlinburg	HZ		X		X	Quedlinburg–Hasselfelde	
Quedlinburg-Quarmbeck	HZ		X			Quedlinburg–Hasselfelde	Operations station
Schierke	HZ			X		Drei Annen Hohne–Brocken	
Silberhütte	HZ		X			Quedlinburg–Hasselfelde	
Sorge	HZ	X				Nordhausen–Wernigerode	
Steinerne Renne	HZ	X				Nordhausen–Wernigerode	
Sternhaus-Haferfeld	HZ		X			Quedlinburg–Hasselfelde	Operations station
Sternhaus-Ramberg	HZ		X			Quedlinburg–Hasselfelde	Operations station
Stiege	HZ		X			Quedlinburg–Hasselfelde, Stiege–Eisfelder Talmühle	
Straßberg	HZ		X			Quedlinburg–Hasselfelde	
Straßberg-Glasebach	HZ		X			Quedlinburg–Hasselfelde	Operations station
Wernigerode	HZ	X			X	Nordhausen–Wernigerode	
Wernigerode-Hochschule Harz	HZ	X				Nordhausen–Wernigerode	Formerly: Wernigerode-Kirchstraße
Wernigerode-Westerntor	HZ	X				Nordhausen–Wernigerode	
