= Dessau-Mosigkau station =

Railway station in Saxony-Anhalt, Germany

Dessau-Mosigkau
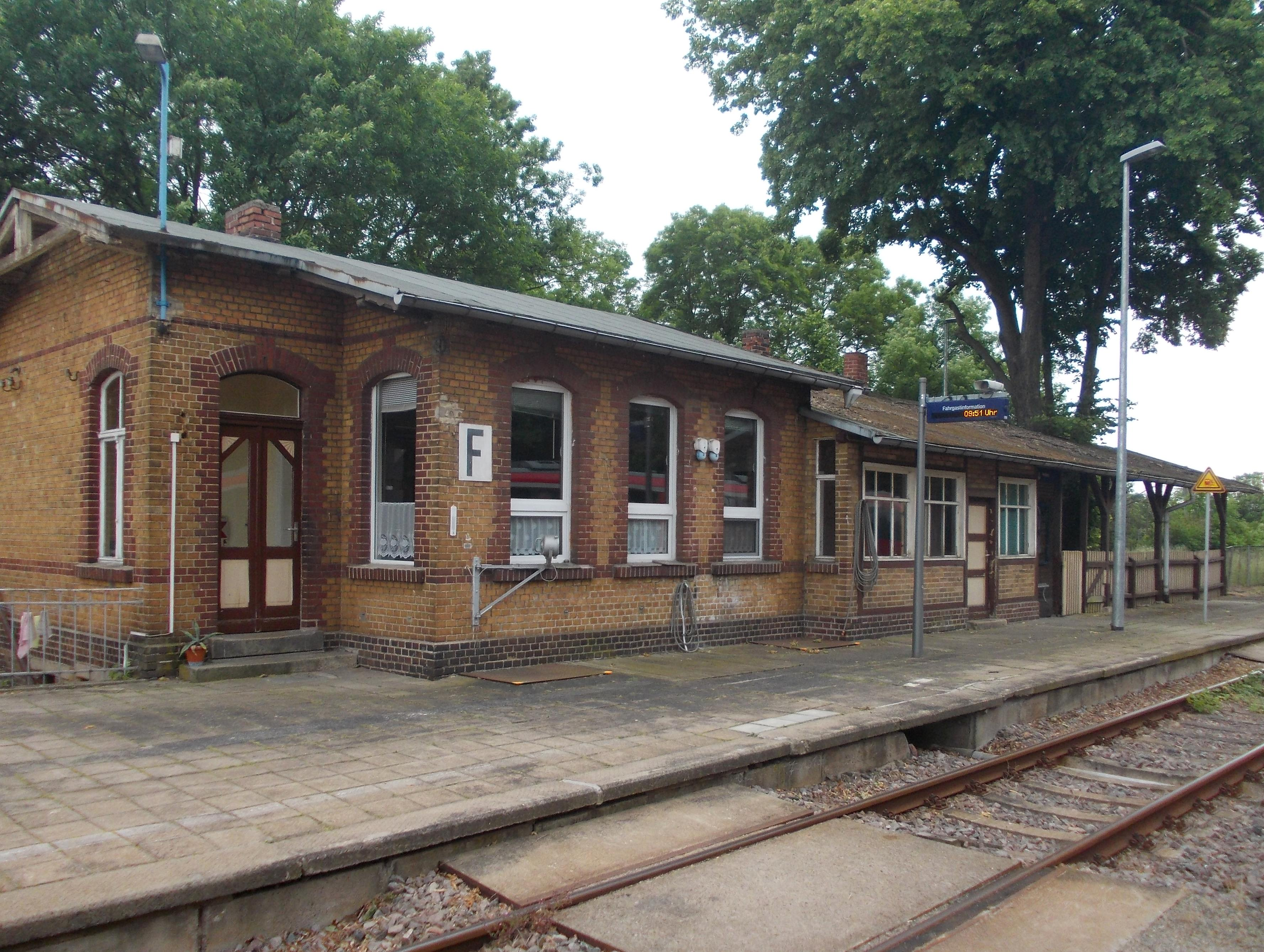
- 2015

General information
- Location: Erich-Weinert-Straße; 06847 Dessau; Saxony-Anhalt; Germany
- Coordinates: 51.8141°N 12.1488°E
- System: Bf
- Owner: DB Netz
- Operator: DB Station&Service
- Lines: Dessau–Köthen railway (KBS 334)
- Platforms: 2 side platforms
- Tracks: 2
- Train operators: Abellio Rail Mitteldeutschland

Construction
- Parking: yes
- Cycle facilities: no
- Accessible: yes

Other information
- Station code: 1177
- DS100 code: LDMO
- IBNR: 8011364
- Category: 6
- Fare zone: MDV: 270 (rail only)
- Website: www.bahnhof.de

Services
Preceding station	Abellio Rail Mitteldeutschland	Following station
Elsnigk (Anh) towards Aschersleben	RB 50	Dessau-Alten towards Dessau Hbf
Location
- Location within Saxony-Anhalt Location within Germany Location within Europe

Dessau-Mosigkau station is a railway station in the Mosigkau district of the town of Dessau, located in Saxony-Anhalt, Germany.
