= Köthen station =

Railway station in Köthen, Germany

Köthen (Anhalt)
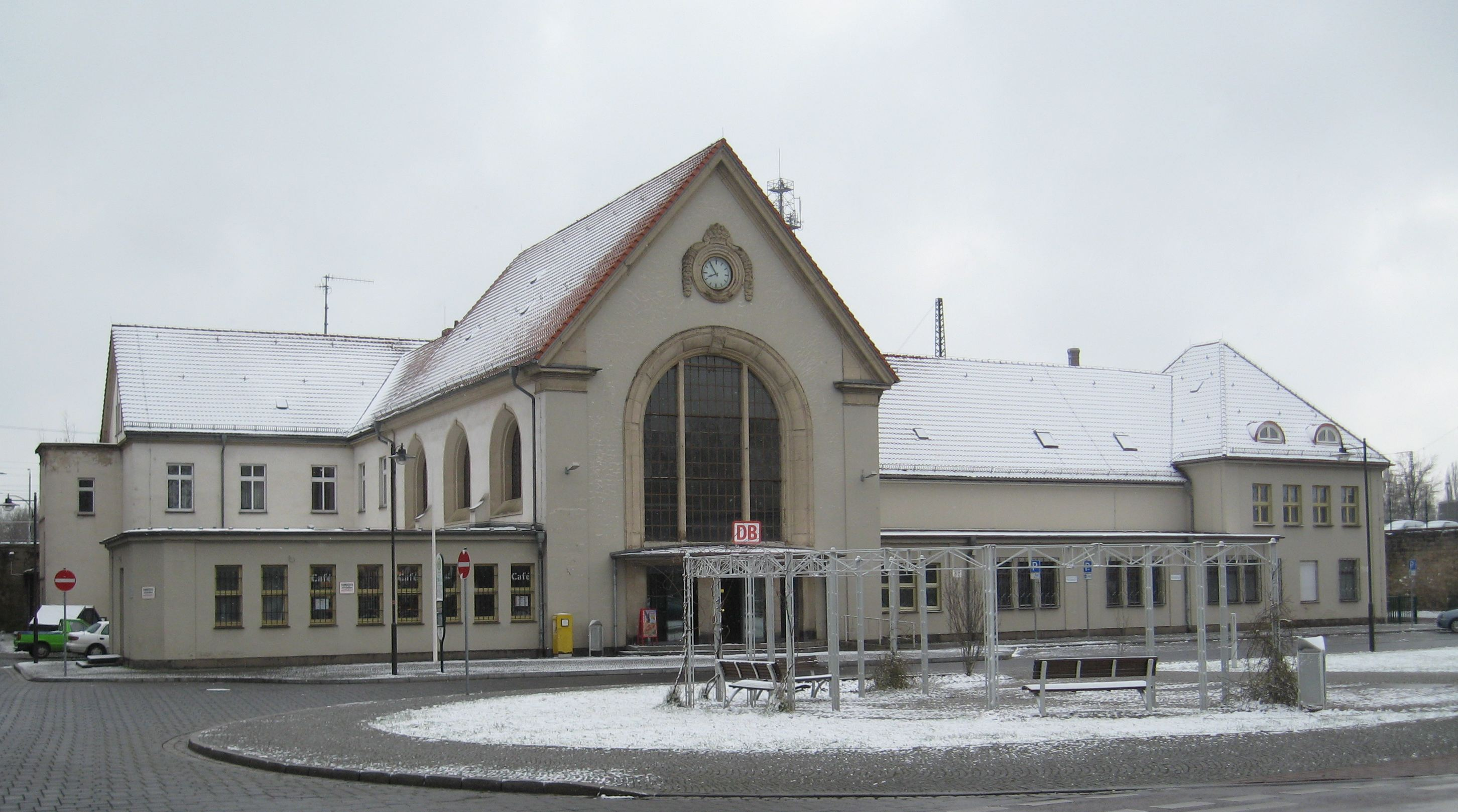
- Köthen railway station

General information
- Location: Köthen, Saxony-Anhalt; Germany
- Coordinates: 51.4507°N 11.5922°E
- Lines: Magdeburg-Leipzig railway; Dessau–Köthen railway; Köthen–Aschersleben railway; Köthen–Aken railway
- Platforms: 5

Construction
- Parking: yes
- Cycle facilities: yes
- Accessible: no

Other information
- Station code: 3382
- DS100 code: LK
- IBNR: 8010195
- Category: 3
- Fare zone: MDV: 268 (rail only)
- Website: www.bahnhof.de

History
- Opened: 9 June 1840; 186 years ago
- Electrified: 1934-1946; 27 July 1955; 71 years ago

Services
Preceding station	DB Fernverkehr	Following station
Magdeburg Hbf towards Stuttgart Hbf	IC 55	Halle (Saale) Hbf towards Dresden Hbf
Magdeburg Hbf towards Norddeich Mole	IC 56	Halle (Saale) Hbf towards Leipzig Hbf
Magdeburg Hbf towards Rostock Hbf or Warnemünde	IC 57	Halle (Saale) Hbf towards Leipzig Hbf
Preceding station	DB Regio Südost	Following station
Wulfen towards Magdeburg Hbf	RE 30	Arensdorf towards Halle (Saale) Hbf
Preceding station	Abellio Rail Mitteldeutschland	Following station
Frenz towards Aschersleben	RB 50	Elsnigk (Anh) towards Dessau Hbf
Location

Köthen (German: Bahnhof Köthen) is a railway station located in Köthen, Germany. The station is located on the Magdeburg-Leipzig railway, Dessau–Köthen railway and Köthen–Aschersleben railway. The train services are operated by Deutsche Bahn. The train services on the Köthen–Aken railway finished in December 2007, due to too few passengers.

== Train services ==
The following services currently call at the station:

- IC 55: (Tübingen –) Stuttgart – Heidelberg – Mainz – Mannheim – Koblenz – Bonn – Cologne – Wuppertal – Dortmund – Hamm – Hannover – Braunschweig – Magdeburg – Köthen – Halle – Leipzig – Dresden
- IC 56: Norddeich Mole – Emden – Oldenburg – Bremen – Hannover – Braunschweig – Magdeburg – Köthen – Halle – Leipzig
- IC 57: Warnemünde – Rostock – Magdeburg – Köthen – Halle – Leipzig
- RE 30: Magdeburg – Köthen – Halle
- RB 50: Aschersleben – Köthen – Dessau
