= EKZ =

EKZ may refer to:

- EKZ CrossTour, a cyclo-cross racing series in Switzerland
- EKZ of Zurich, a Swiss utility service and owner of Puerto Errado
- Code for Vellmar-Osterberg, a stop on the Kassel–Warburg railway
- EKZ Racing Team, racing cycling team of Théry Schir
- EKZ, author of Himekishi ga Classmate!
- EKZ Fischapark, a shopping mall in Austria
- Equator Knowledge Zone, a database for nominees of the Equator Prize
- EKZ Productions, producers of Authors Anonymous
- Klostermansfeld EKZ, a railway station in Saxony-Anhalt
- EKZ Arena, a boxing venue hosting Christina Hammer
