= Dessau-Alten station =

Train station in Dessau-Roßlau, Germany

Dessau-Alten
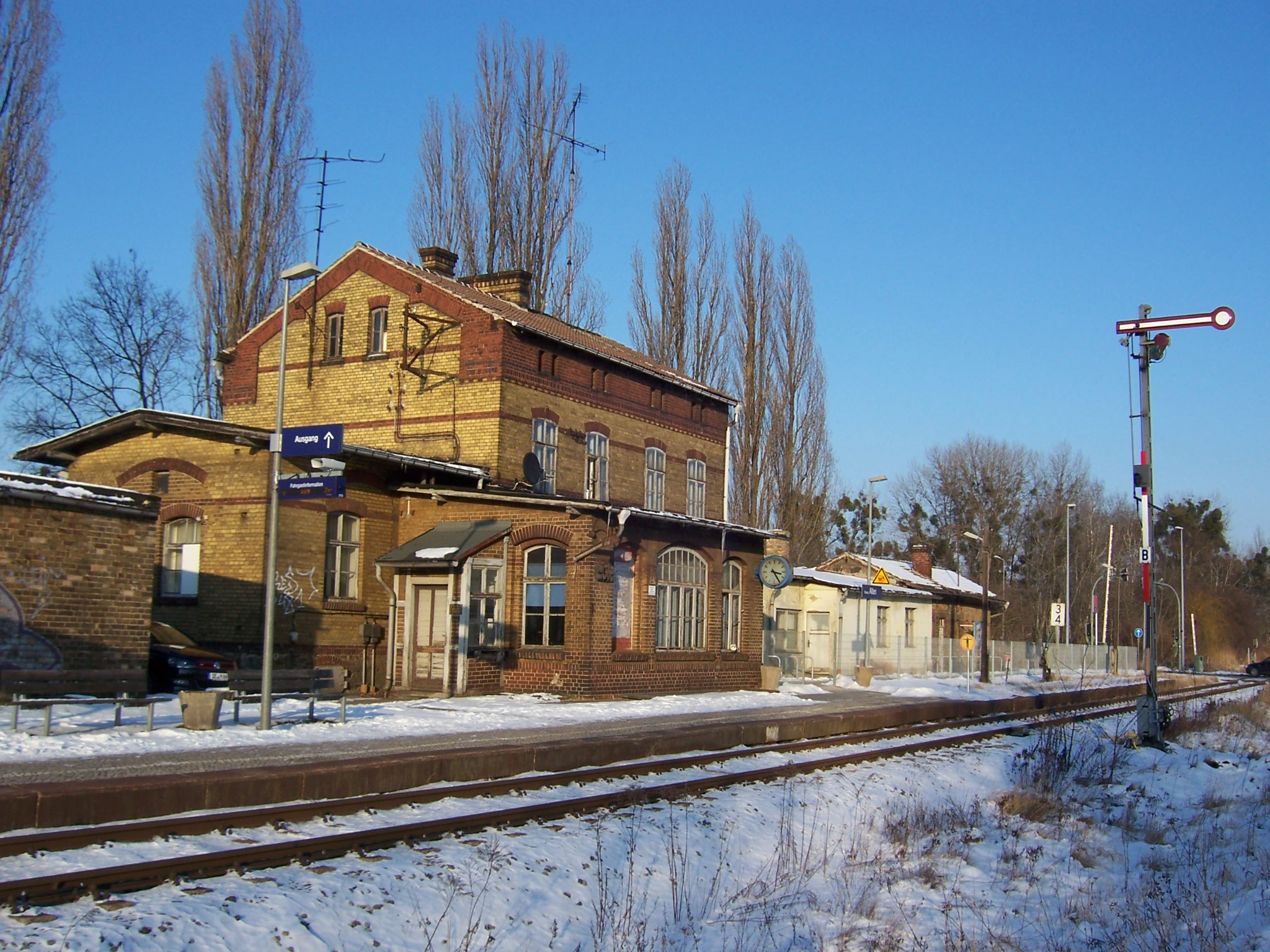
- 2012

General information
- Location: Hünefeldstraße 10; 06844 Dessau; Saxony-Anhalt; Germany
- Coordinates: 51.8256°N 12.1934°E
- System: Bf
- Owner: DB Netz
- Operator: DB Station&Service
- Lines: Dessau–Köthen railway (KBS 334)
- Platforms: 1 side platform
- Tracks: 1
- Train operators: Abellio Rail Mitteldeutschland

Construction
- Parking: no
- Cycle facilities: yes
- Accessible: yes

Other information
- Station code: 1176
- DS100 code: LDAL
- IBNR: 8011363
- Category: 6
- Fare zone: MDV: 270 (rail only)
- Website: www.bahnhof.de

Services
| Preceding station | Abellio Rail Mitteldeutschland | Following station |
|---|---|---|
| Dessau-Mosigkau towards Aschersleben | RB 50 | Dessau Hbf Terminus |
Location
- Location within Saxony-Anhalt Location within Germany Location within Europe

Dessau-Alten station is a railway station in the Alten district of the town of Dessau, located in Saxony-Anhalt, Germany.
