= Elsnigk (Anh) station =

Railway station in Saxony-Anhalt, Germany

Elsnigk (Anh)
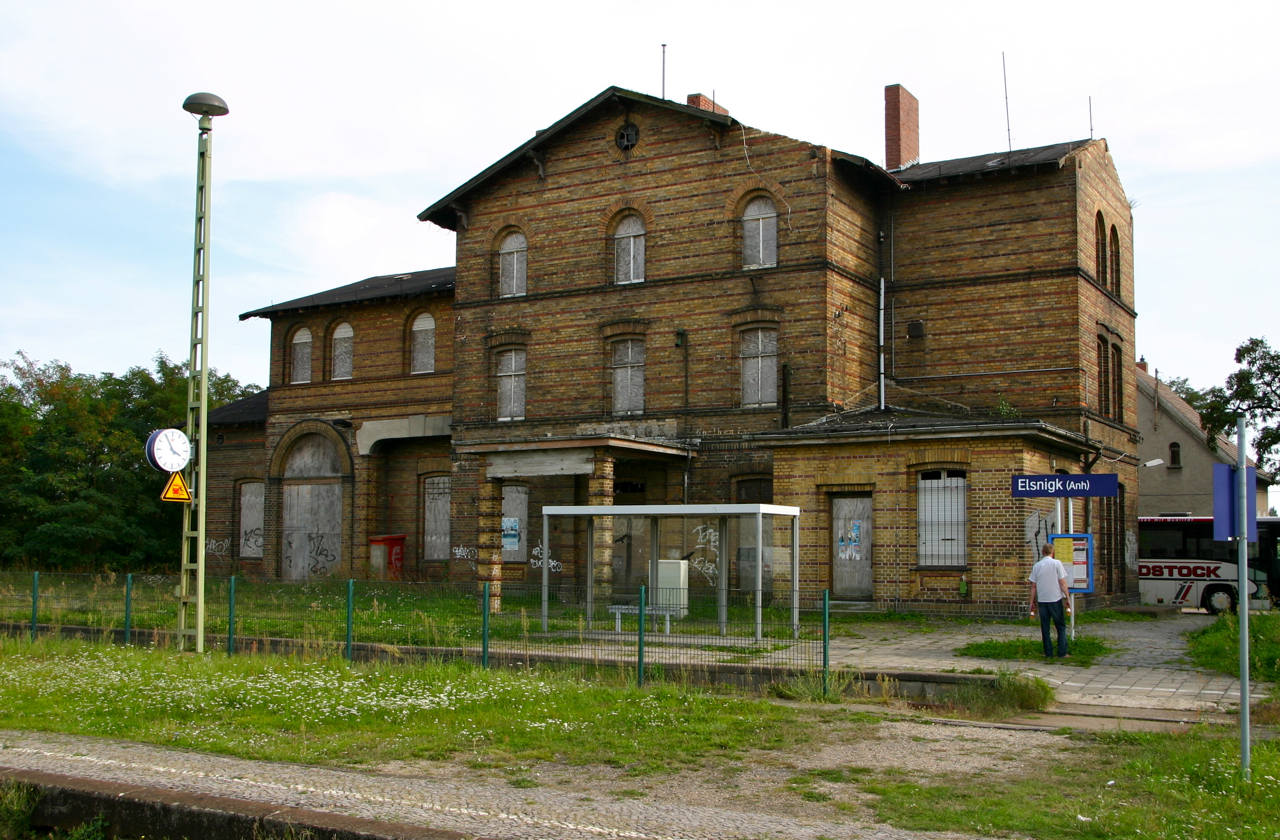
- 2011

General information
- Location: An der Bahn; 06386 Elsnigk; Saxony-Anhalt; Germany
- Coordinates: 51.7908°N 12.0594°E
- System: Bf
- Owner: DB Netz
- Operator: DB Station&Service
- Lines: Dessau–Köthen railway (KBS 334)
- Platforms: 1 side platform
- Tracks: 2
- Train operators: Abellio Rail Mitteldeutschland

Construction
- Parking: no
- Cycle facilities: no
- Accessible: yes

Other information
- Station code: 1564
- DS100 code: LEK
- IBNR: 8011484
- Category: 6
- Fare zone: MDV: 273 (rail only)
- Website: www.bahnhof.de

Services
Preceding station	Abellio Rail Mitteldeutschland	Following station
Köthen towards Aschersleben	RB 50	Dessau-Mosigkau towards Dessau Hbf
Location
- Location within Saxony-Anhalt Location within Germany Location within Europe

Elsnigk (Anh) station is a railway station in the municipality of Elsnigk, located in the Anhalt-Bitterfeld district in Saxony-Anhalt, Germany.
