= Halle Messe station =

Railway station in Germany

Halle Messe
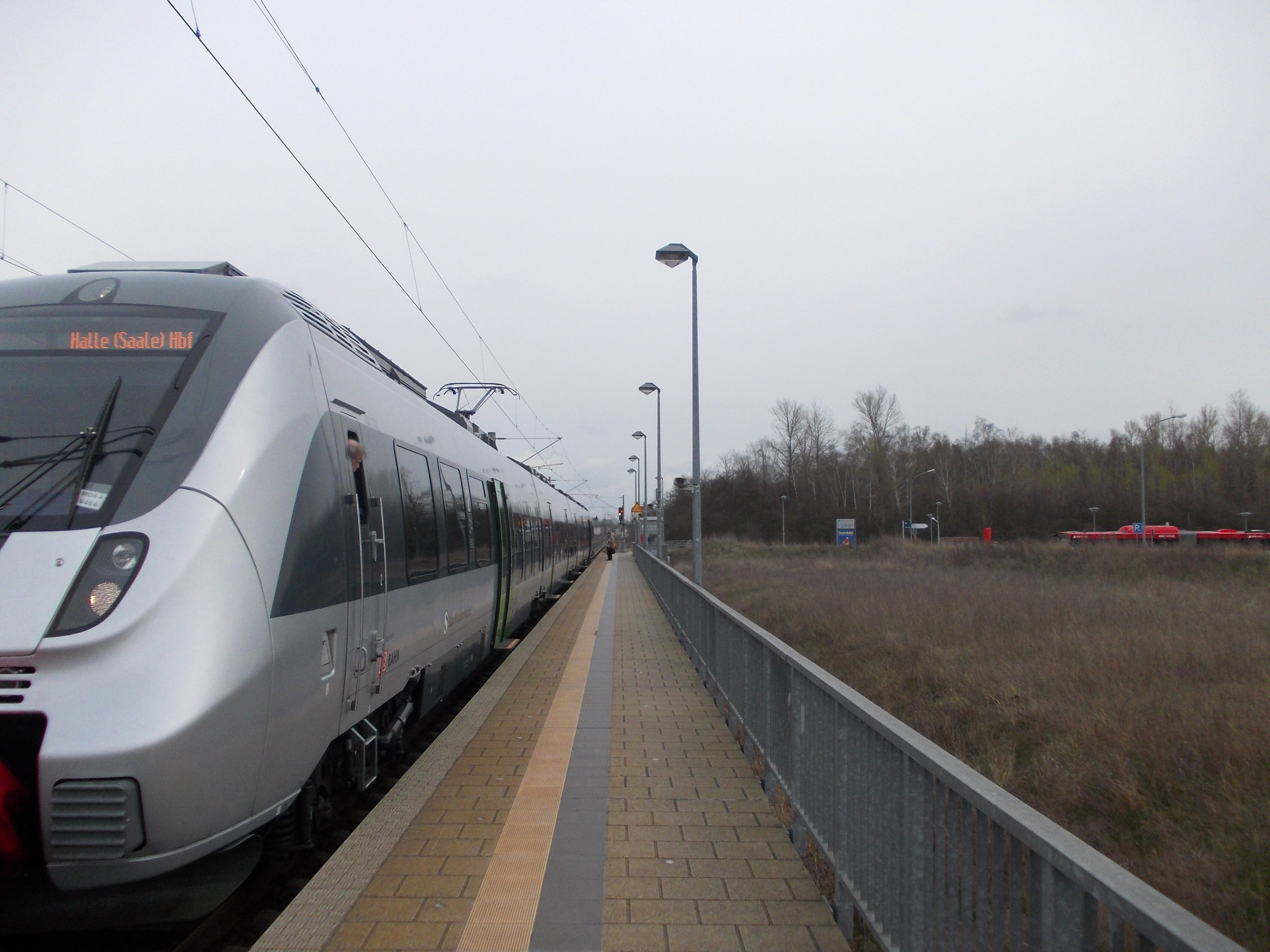
- Halle Messe station

General information
- Location: Halle (Saale), Saxony-Anhalt; Germany
- Coordinates: 51.4547°N 12.0279°E
- Owner: Deutsche Bahn
- Operator: DB Netz; DB Station&Service
- Line: Magdeburg-Leipzig railway
- Platforms: 1
- Connections: 26, 43, 44

Other information
- Fare zone: MDV: 210
- Website: www.bahnhof.de

Services
Preceding station	Mitteldeutschland S-Bahn	Following station
Halle (Saale) Hbf towards Halle-Nietleben	S 3	Dieskau towards Wurzen or Oschatz
Location

Halle Messe (German: Bahnhof Halle Messe) is a railway station located in Halle (Saale), Germany. The station is located on the Magdeburg-Leipzig railway. The train services are operated by Deutsche Bahn. Since December 2013 the station is served by the S-Bahn Mitteldeutschland.

== Train services ==
The following services currently call at the station:
