= Wiesenburg–Roßlau railway =

Railway line in Germany

Overview
- Line number: 6414
- Locale: Brandenburg and Saxony-Anhalt, Germany

Service
- Route number: 207

Technical
- Line length: 28.7 km (17.8 mi)
- Track gauge: 1,435 mm (4 ft 8 1/2 in) standard gauge
- Electrification: 15 kV/16.7 Hz AC catenary

The Wiesenburg–Roßlau railway is a two-track main line in the German states of Brandenburg and Saxony-Anhalt. It is part of a line connecting Berlin and Halle / Leipzig via Dessau.

== History ==
In 1841, the Berlin-Anhalt Railway Company (German: Berlin-Anhaltische Eisenbahn-Gesellschaft) completed its main line from Berlin to Dessau via Wittenberg. In 1879 the Berlin-Blankenheim railway, opened as part of the Cannons Railway (Kanonenbahn) project, was a link from the Berlin Stadtbahn via Belzig, Wiesenburg to Güsten and continuing to western Germany. Because of its primarily military function, this route mainly avoided all major towns. Only in the 1920s, very late for a major railway, was a connection built between Wiesenburg and Roßlau, closing the gap between two lines and significantly shortening the line between Berlin and Dessau. On 1 April 1921, the section was opened from Jeber-Bergfrieden to the connection with the Wittenberg line at Meinsdorf; on 1 June 1923 this was followed by the opening of the section from Wiesenburg to Jeber-Bergfrieden.

The new route quickly carried a large amount of traffic from the Berlin-Blankenheim railway. In 1934 express trains operated between Berlin and Wiesbaden and Berlin and Frankfurt over the track.

After the division of Germany in 1945, and especially after the building of the Berlin Wall in 1961, the line was unattractive for direct long-distance passenger trains from Halle and Leipzig to Berlin because eastern Berlin could only be reached indirectly via the Berlin outer ring; instead trains went via Wittenberg. However, the line via Wiesenburg was important for freight transport because it was the shortest route between the Halle/Leipzig industrial region and the large freight yard at Seddin. Passenger services in the 1970s and 1980s included express trains on the Rostock–Potsdam–Karl-Marx-Stadt and on the Berlin–Belzig–Dessau–Aschersleben routes. Also, interzone trains ran between West Berlin and West Germany on this line.

After German reunification, the importance of the line increased at first, since it was the fastest connection from southern and western Germany to West Berlin. A number of express trains—and in the second half of the 1990s, Berlin–Frankfurt Interregio services—used the line. This changed gradually with the upgrading of the Berlin–Halle line via Wittenberg and the opening of the Berlin North–South mainline through the Tiergarten Tunnel in 2006. Since then, almost all long-distance trains use the faster route via Wittenberg; the last InterCity train stopped at Dessau in 2007. The only long-distance trains to use the line now are night trains. Regional-Express service RE7 between Berlin and Dessau runs on the line at two hourly intervals (with extra trains in the peak hour).
