= Uchtspringe station =

Railway station in Germany

Uchtspringe

General information
- Location: Uchtspringe, Saxony-Anhalt; Germany
- Coordinates: 52°32′37″N 11°35′33″E
- Line: Berlin–Lehrte (KBS 202)
- Platforms: 2

Other information
- Station code: 6303
- DS100 code: LUS
- Category: 7

Services
Preceding station	Abellio Rail Mitteldeutschland	Following station
Jävenitz towards Wolfsburg Hbf	RB 35	Vinzelberg towards Stendal Hbf
Location
- Location within Saxony-Anhalt

Uchtspringe (German: Bahnhof Uchtspringe) is a railway station located in Uchtspringe, Germany. The station is located on the Berlin-Lehrte Railway. The train services are operated by Deutsche Bahn.

== Train services ==
The station is serves by the following service(s):

- Local services RB 35 Wolfsburg - Stendal
