= Vinzelberg station =

Railway station in Germany

Vinzelberg

General information
- Location: Vinzelberg, Saxony-Anhalt; Germany
- Coordinates: 52.5692°N 11.6718°E
- Line: Berlin–Lehrte (KBS 202)
- Platforms: 2

Other information
- Station code: 6425
- DS100 code: LVG
- Category: 6

Services
Preceding station	Abellio Rail Mitteldeutschland	Following station
Uchtspringe towards Wolfsburg Hbf	RB 35	Möringen towards Stendal Hbf
Location
- Location within Saxony-Anhalt

Vinzelberg (German: Bahnhof Vinzelberg) is a railway station located in Vinzelberg, Germany. The station is located on the Berlin-Lehrte Railway. The train services are operated by Deutsche Bahn.

== Train services ==
The station is serves by the following service(s):

- Local services RB 35 Wolfsburg - Stendal
