= Köthen–Aschersleben railway =

Railway line in Germany

Köthen–Aschersleben

Overview
- Line number: 6420
- Locale: Saxony-Anhalt, Germany

Service
- Route number: 334

Technical
- Line length: 43.7 km (27.2 mi)
- Track gauge: 1,435 mm (4 ft 8 1/2 in) standard gauge
- Operating speed: 100 km/h (62 mph) (maximum)

The Köthen–Aschersleben railway is one of the oldest railway lines in Germany, with its eastern half opened in 1846. It forms an east-west link in the state of Saxony-Anhalt and connects several major towns.

== History ==
The first serious plans for the construction of the line were developed by the Duchy of Anhalt in 1845. At the time, Köthen already had rail connections in three directions, with the Magdeburg-Leipzig line connecting to Magdeburg in the north and Halle in the south and the main line of the Berlin-Anhalt Railway Company (German: Berlin-Anhaltische Eisenbahn-Gesellschaft) connecting to Dessau and Berlin in the east. In 1845, the Anhalt-Köthen-Bernburg Railway Company (Anhalt-Köthen-Bernburger Eisenbahn) was founded and shortly thereafter got approval for the construction of the Köthen–Bernburg line.

The following year the line was opened, terminating at Köthen’s third station. Biendorf was the only station in between. In 1863, the Anhalt-Köthen-Bernburg Railway was taken by the Magdeburg-Halberstadt Railway Company (Magdeburg-Halberstädter Eisenbahngesellschaft, MHE). The line was extended in 1865 to Aschersleben and a new station was opened in Bernburg, replacing the station opened in 1846. In 1879 the Prussian government acquired the MHE. In the 1880s, Bernburg became an important industrial city. Sidings were opened to the Solvay Company’s factory and to a salt mine in southern Bernburg. At that time a roundhouse was opened in Bernburg.

In 1889, a branch line was opened to Könnern along with Baalberge station. In 1890, a branch was opened to Calbe. In 1898 and 1899, the line was duplicated. There were plans in 1908 for the electrification of the track. The first accumulator railcars were used on the line from 1908. The second track was removed after World War II between Köthen and Güsten to provide reparations to the Soviet Union. In the post-war period, many trains carrying spoil from open-cut lignite mines operated over the line. In 1952, a station was opened at Frenz between Köthen and Bernburg.

The second track was restored in 1962 on the Aschersleben–Güsten section. In 1964, the branch from Biendorf to Gerlebogk was closed and dismantled. In 1967, Baalberge station was rebuilt. With it a siding was built to the nearby rock salt mine. At the same time the second track was restored between Köthen and Bernburg. Also in 1976, a new depot was built in Güsten and gradually took over the functions of the Bernburg depot, which was closed in 1991. In the early 1990s, the branch line to Edderitz was dismantled. In 1992, the East German Railways planned the electrification of the line and some connecting lines, but these plans came to nothing.

== Operations ==
Since 2004, the Elbe Saale Bahn (a subsidiary of Deutsche Bahn) has had the contract to operate Regionalbahn services of the Altmark–Börde–Anhalt network on the line every hour with class 642 (Siemens Desiro Classic) diesel multiple units. These trains continue through Köthen on the line to Dessau. On the Güsten–Aschersleben section, addition Regionalbahn services operate between Magdeburg and Aschersleben. Similarly, Regionalbahn trains are operated by Elbe Saale Bahn between Bernburg and Calbe every two hours. Between Bernburg and Baalberge (and continuing to Halle), Veolia Verkehr Sachsen-Anhalt operates services (branded as HarzElbeExpress, HEX) every two hours with LINT 27 diesel multiple units.

The route is heavily used by freight services, with the sidings of Schwenk cement, Solvay GmbH and K + S in Bernburg providing regular consignments.
