= Möringen railway station =

Railway station in Germany

Möringen (Altm)
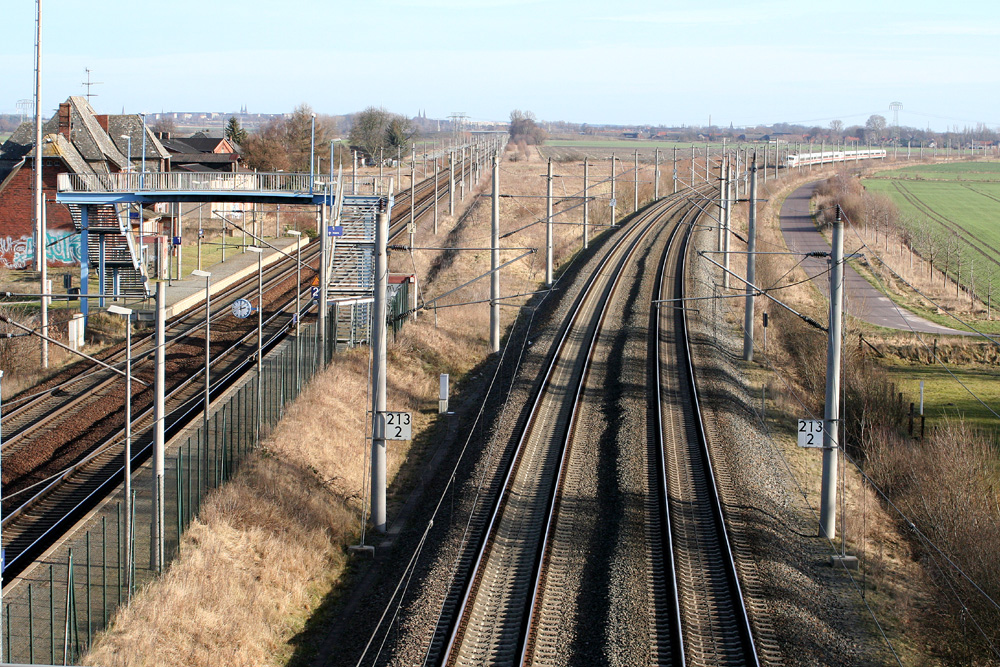
- Möringen station on left

General information
- Location: Möringen, Saxony-Anhalt; Germany
- Coordinates: 52°34′53″N 11°44′54″E
- Line: Berlin–Lehrte (KBS 202)
- Platforms: 2

Other information
- Station code: 4175
- DS100 code: LMGN
- Category: 7

Services
Preceding station	Abellio Rail Mitteldeutschland	Following station
Vinzelberg towards Wolfsburg Hbf	RB 35	Stendal Hbf Terminus
Location
- Location within Saxony-Anhalt

Möringen (Altm) (German: Bahnhof Möringen) is a railway station located in Möringen, Germany. The station is located on the Berlin-Lehrte Railway. The train services are operated by Deutsche Bahn.

== Train services ==
The station is serves by the following service(s):

- Local services RB 35 Wolfsburg - Stendal
