= Gardelegen station =

Railway station in Gardelegen, Germany

Gardelegen
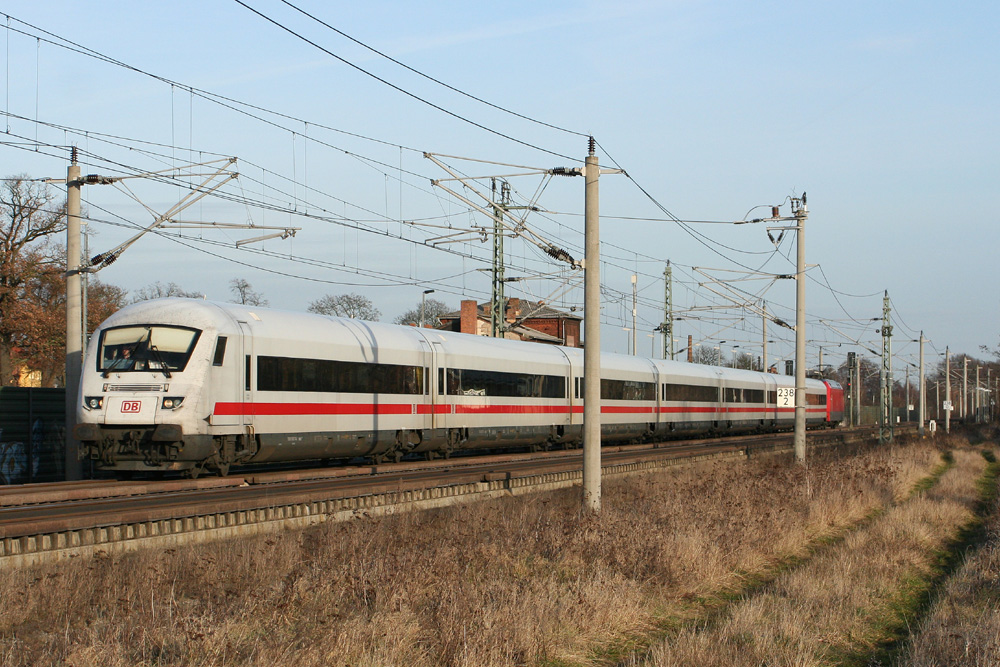
- Gardelegen station

General information
- Location: Gardelegen, Saxony-Anhalt; Germany
- Coordinates: 52.518144°N 11.403847°E
- Line: Berlin–Lehrte (KBS 202)
- Platforms: 2

Other information
- Station code: 2011
- DS100 code: LGA
- Category: 6

Services
Preceding station	Abellio Rail Mitteldeutschland	Following station
Solpke towards Wolfsburg Hbf	RB 35	Jävenitz towards Stendal Hbf
Location
- Location within Saxony-Anhalt

Gardelegen (German: Bahnhof Gardelegen) is a railway station located in Gardelegen, Germany. The station is located on the Berlin-Lehrte Railway. The train services are operated by Deutsche Bahn.

== Train services ==
The station is serves by the following service(s):

- Local services RB 35 Wolfsburg - Stendal
