= Jävenitz station =

Railway station in Germany

Jävenitz

General information
- Location: Jävenitz, Saxony-Anhalt; Germany
- Coordinates: 52°31′10″N 11°29′34″E
- Line: Berlin–Lehrte (KBS 202)
- Platforms: 2

Other information
- Station code: 3039
- DS100 code: LJV
- Category: 6

Services
Preceding station	Abellio Rail Mitteldeutschland	Following station
Gardelegen towards Wolfsburg Hbf	RB 35	Uchtspringe towards Stendal Hbf
Location
- Location within Saxony-Anhalt

Jävenitz (German: Bahnhof Jävenitz) is a railway station located in Jävenitz, Germany. The station is located on the Berlin-Lehrte Railway. The train services are operated by Deutsche Bahn.

== Train services ==
The station is serves by the following service(s):

- Local services RB 35 Wolfsburg - Stendal
