= Merseburg Hauptbahnhof =

Railway station in Merseburg, Germany

Merseburg
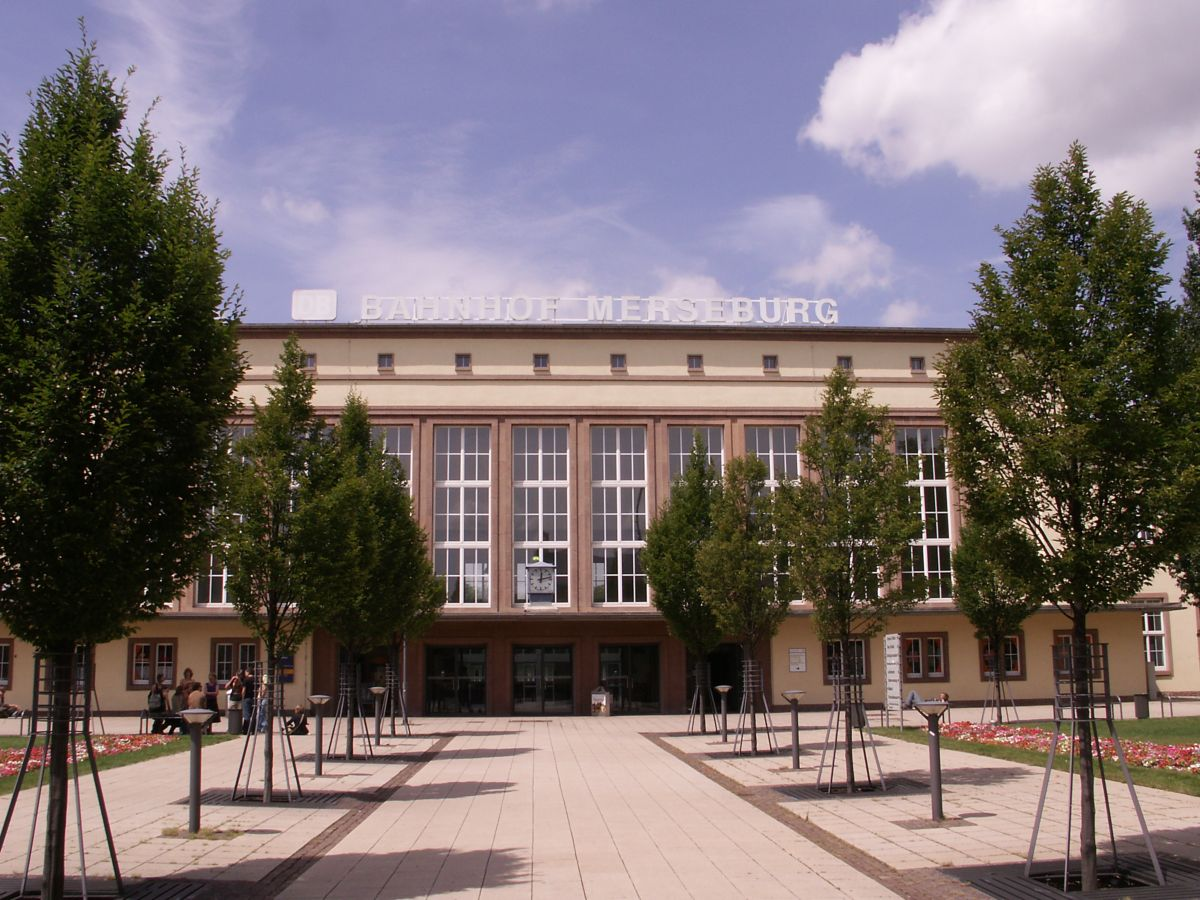
- Entrance building

General information
- Location: Bahnhofsplatz 1, Merseburg, Saxony-Anhalt; Germany
- Coordinates: 51°21′25″N 11°59′26″E
- Owner: Deutsche Bahn
- Operator: DB Netz; DB Station&Service
- Lines: Halle–Bebra (KBS 581); Merseburg–Querfurt (KBS 586); Merseburg–Schafstädt (KBS 588); Merseburg–Halle-Nietleben (KBS 588); Merseburg–Leipzig-Leutzch (KBS 584)
- Platforms: 4

Construction
- Accessible: Yes

Other information
- Station code: 4067
- DS100 code: LMG
- IBNR: 8010232
- Category: 4
- Fare zone: MDV: 233
- Website: www.bahnhof.de

History
- Opened: 1846

Services
Preceding station	Abellio Rail Mitteldeutschland	Following station
Weißenfels towards Erfurt Hbf	RE 16	Halle (Saale) Hbf Terminus
Leuna Werke Nord towards Saalfeld (Saale)	RB 25	Schkopau towards Halle (Saale) Hbf
Preceding station	Mitteldeutschland S-Bahn	Following station
Merseburg Bergmannsring towards Querfurt	S 11	Schkopau towards Halle (Saale) Hbf
Location

Merseburg Hauptbahnhof is the main station of the town of Merseburg in the German state of Saxony-Anhalt. It is located on the Halle–Bebra railway (Thuringian Railway) and Deutsche Bahn assigns it to category 4. Merseburg is located in the tariff area of the Mitteldeutscher Verkehrsverbund (central Germany transport association).

== History ==
Merseburg station was opened on 20 June 1846 when Merseburg was connected to the Halle (Saale) – Weißenfels railway. This was the first section opened of the route which later ran via Weimar, Erfurt and Eisenach to Bebra.

The Merseburg–Mücheln section of the Merseburg–Querfurt railway was opened in December 1886.

The line to Schafstädt was opened on 1 November 1896. Due to declining passenger numbers, Nahverkehrsservice Sachsen-Anhalt (local transport service of Saxony-Anhalt), ended all services of the Merseburg–Schafstädt railway from 14 December 2014. The rail service was replaced by state bus route 728 operated by Personennahverkehrsgesellschaft Merseburg-Querfurt.

The section of the Merseburg–Leipzig-Leutzsch railway from Merseburg to Zöschen was opened in 1910. After being interrupted by the First World War, traffic on the line resumed in 1928 and it was finally extended to Leipzig-Leutzsch on 7 July 1931, which gave the station a direct connection to Leipzig. Due to declining passenger numbers services ended in 1998, so Merseburg lost its direct connection to Leipzig and passengers now have to change in Halle (Saale) or Großkorbetha.

Merseburg finally got a new station building in 1956, because the former had been destroyed by air raids in the Second World War. The Merseburg–Halle-Nietleben railway was opened in 1967; it was mainly used by a shuttle service to Buna-Werke.

There was also a Frankfurt–Berlin InterRegio service at two-hour intervals until 1999. It continued to further destinations such as Stralsund or Konstanz.

The station was given the suffix "Hauptbahnhof" ("main station") at the timetable changed on 15 December 2019.

== Rolling stock ==
Bombardier Talent 2 electric multiple units have been operated on Regionalbahn line 20 by Abellio Rail Mitteldeutschland since 13 December 2015. DB Regio operated the service until 12 December 2015 with class 182 locomotives and Halberstädter Mitteleinstiegswagen (Halberstädt central-entry carriages) as well as occasional double-deck carriages. The RB 78 service is operated by Burgenlandbahn (a brand of DB Regio) with class 672 diesel multiple units and the Regional-Express 30 service to Magdeburg is operated with class 146 locomotives with double-deck carriages.

== Services ==
Currently (2025) Merseburg is served by the following regional services:

Line	Route	Interval (mins)	Operator
RE 16	Halle – Merseburg – Weißenfels – Naumburg – Bad Kösen – Apolda – Weimar – Erfurt	60	Abellio
RB 25	Halle – Merseburg – Weißenfels – Naumburg – Camburg – Jena Paradies – Orlamünde – Saalfeld	60	Abellio
S 11	Halle – Halle-Ammendorf – Schkopau – Merseburg – Frankleben – Braunsbedra – Mücheln (Geiseltal) – Querfurt	60	Mitteldeutschland S-Bahn

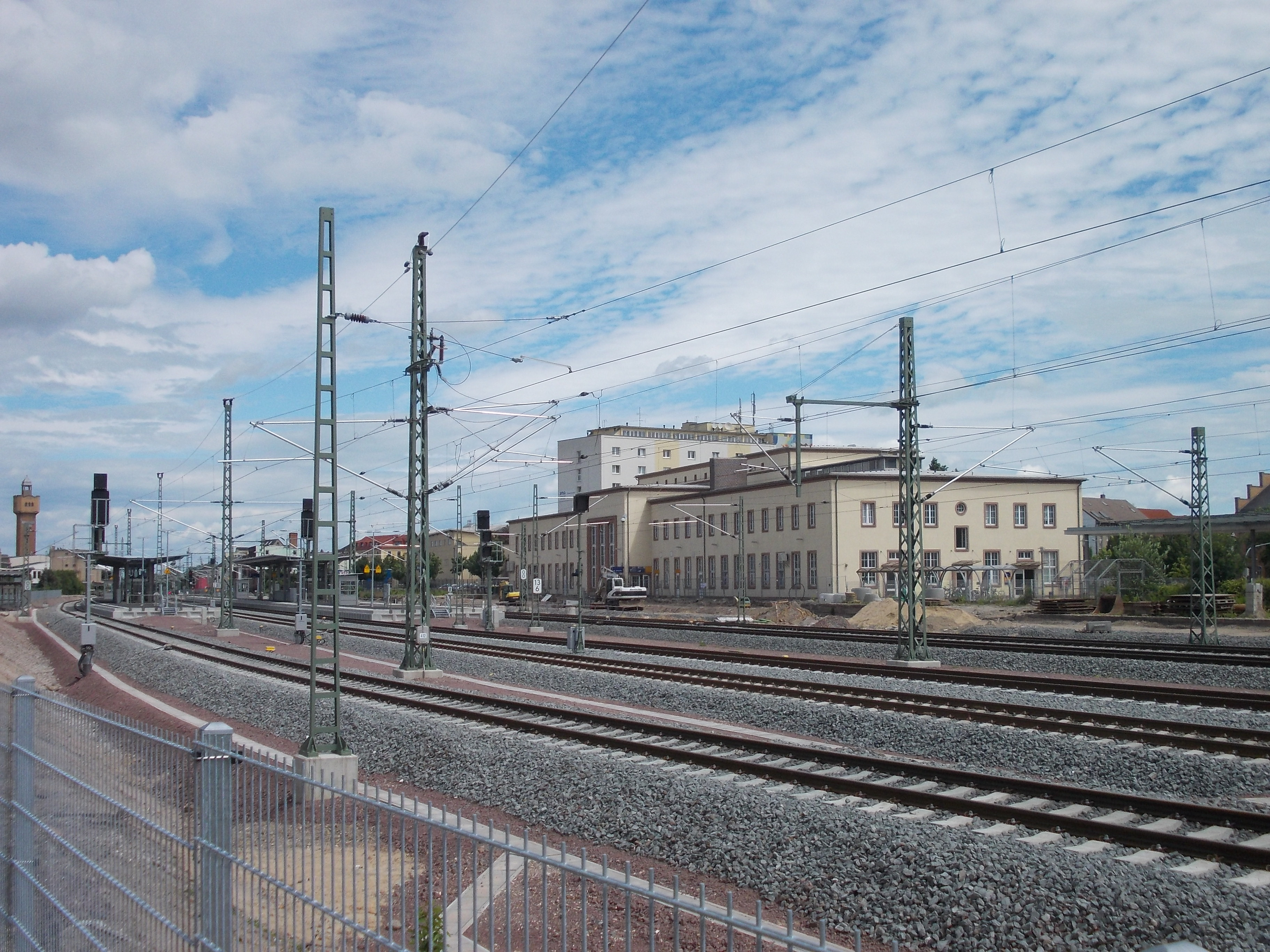
Merseburg station after its reconstruction in 2013

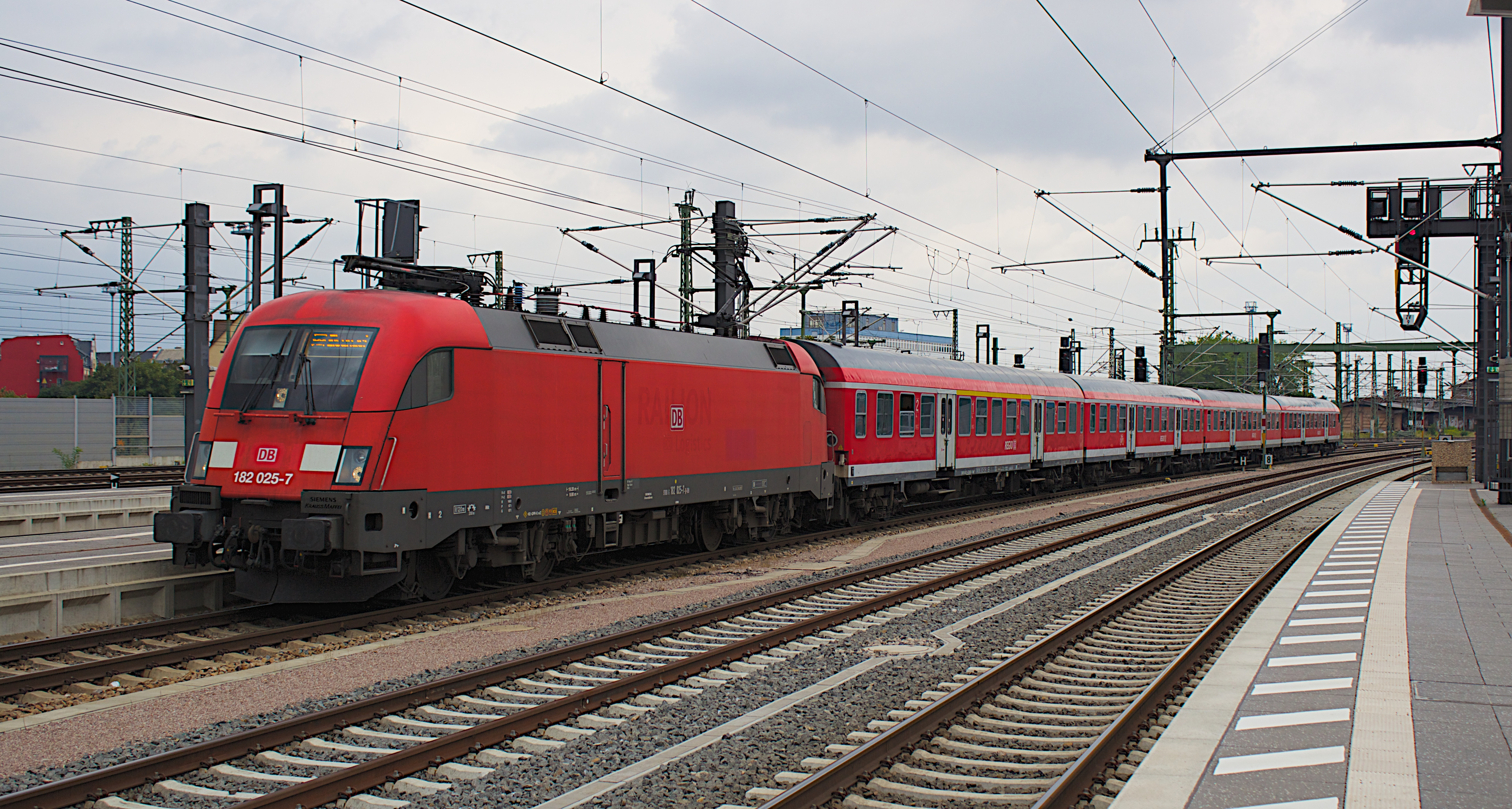
DB Regio train on line RB 20

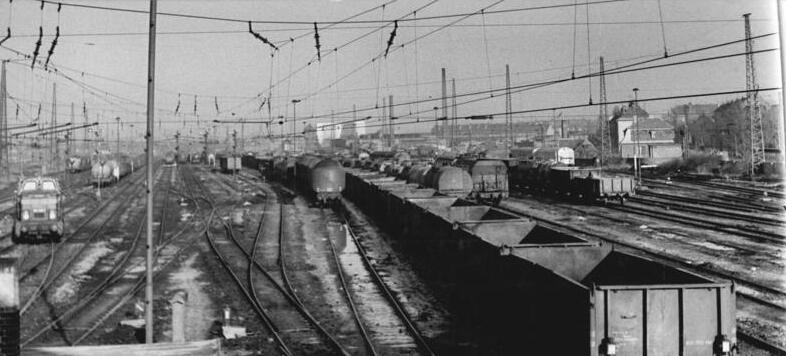
Merseburg freight yard, 1971

== Signal box ==
Merseburg station was extensively modernised between 2011 and 2013. An electronic interlocking was also installed. Since then Merseburg station has been controlled from the Leipzig control centre.

== Freight yard ==
Merseburg used to have a large freight yard south of the passenger station. This was important for the transport of lignite to the Leuna works. It is now administered as part of the station.

== See also ==
- Rail transport in Germany
- Railway stations in Germany
