= Mieste station =

Railway station in Germany

Mieste

General information
- Location: Mieste, Saxony-Anhalt; Germany
- Coordinates: 52°29′02″N 11°12′19″E
- Line: Berlin–Lehrte (KBS 202)

Other information
- Station code: 4104
- DS100 code: LMST
- Category: 6

Services
Preceding station	Abellio Rail Mitteldeutschland	Following station
Miesterhorst towards Wolfsburg Hbf	RB 35	Solpke towards Stendal Hbf
Location
- Location within Saxony-Anhalt

Mieste (German: Bahnhof Mieste) is a railway station located in Mieste, Germany. The station is located on the Berlin-Lehrte Railway. The train services are operated by Deutsche Bahn.

== Train services ==
The station is serves by the following service(s):

- Local services RB 35 Wolfsburg - Stendal
