= Merseburg–Halle-Nietleben railway =

Railway line in Germany

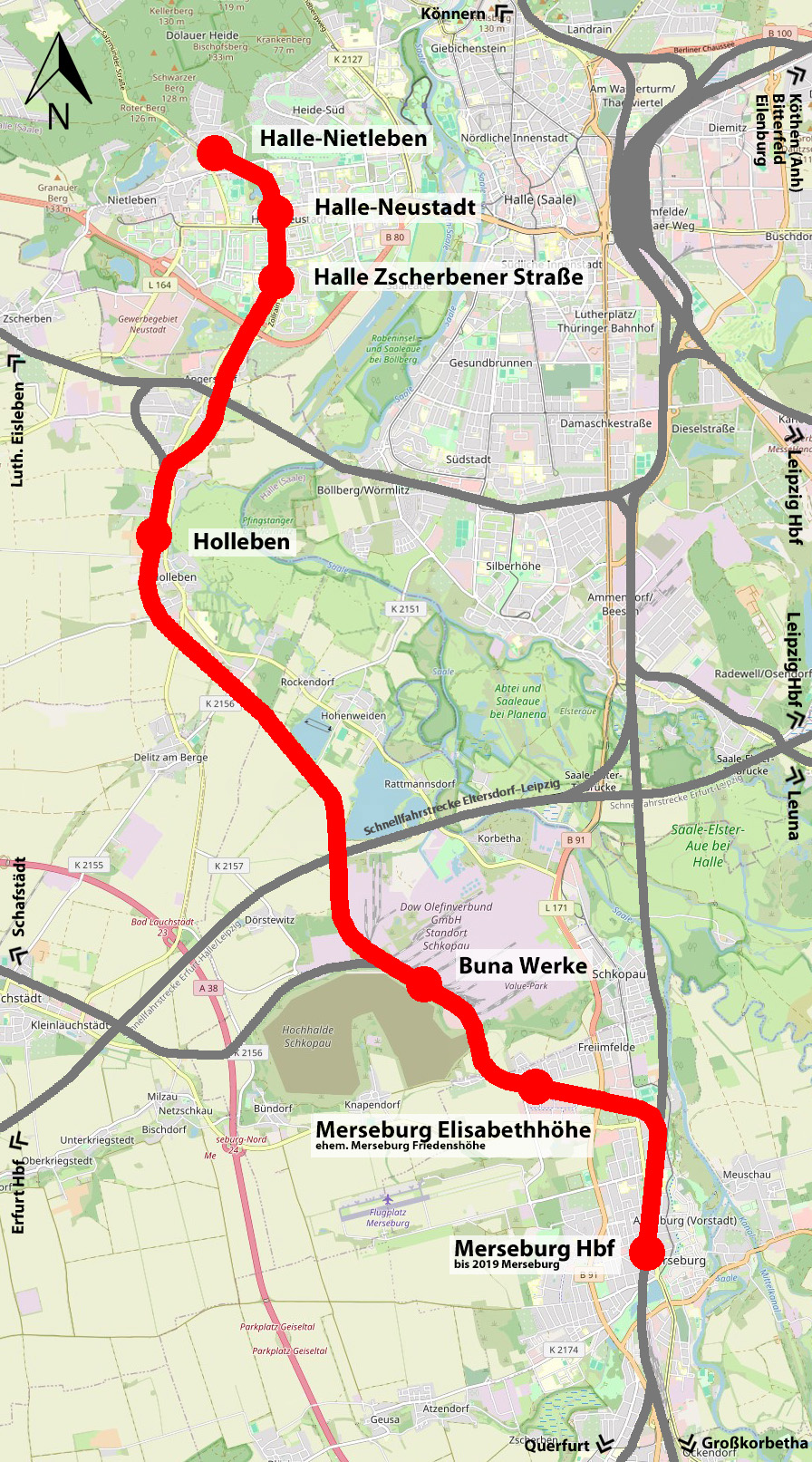
- Freight train at Elisabethhöhe station

Overview
- Line number: 6356 (Merseburg–H.-Nietleben); 6357 (Merseburg–M.-Elisabethhöhe); 6389 (Bad Lauchstädt–Angersdorf)
- Locale: Saxony-Anhalt, Germany

Service
- Route number: 588

Technical
- Line length: 19.2 km (11.9 mi)
- Track gauge: 1,435 mm (4 ft 8 1/2 in) standard gauge
- Electrification: 15 kV/16.7 Hz AC catenary
- Operating speed: 100 km/h (62.1 mph) (maximum)
- Maximum incline: 2.0%

The Merseburg–Halle-Nietleben railway is an about 19 kilometre-long electrified branch line in the German state of Saxony-Anhalt. A second track exists between Merseburg and Merseburg-Elisabethhöhe and between Halle-Zscherbener Straße and Halle-Nietleben. Part of the current route was built in 1967 with a significant realignment of the Zwiebelbahn on the (Merseburg–) Bad Lauchstädt–Angersdorf route.

== History ==
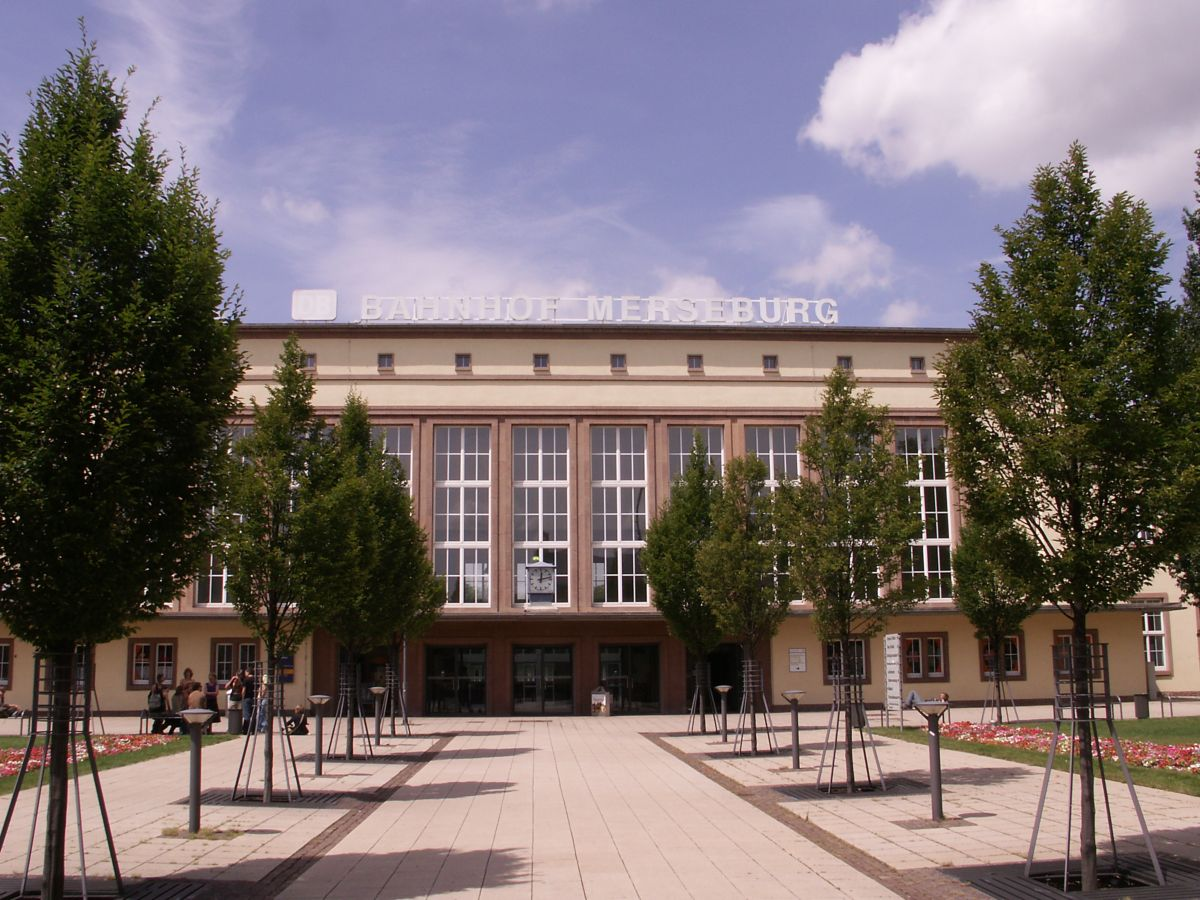
2007 – Merseburg station

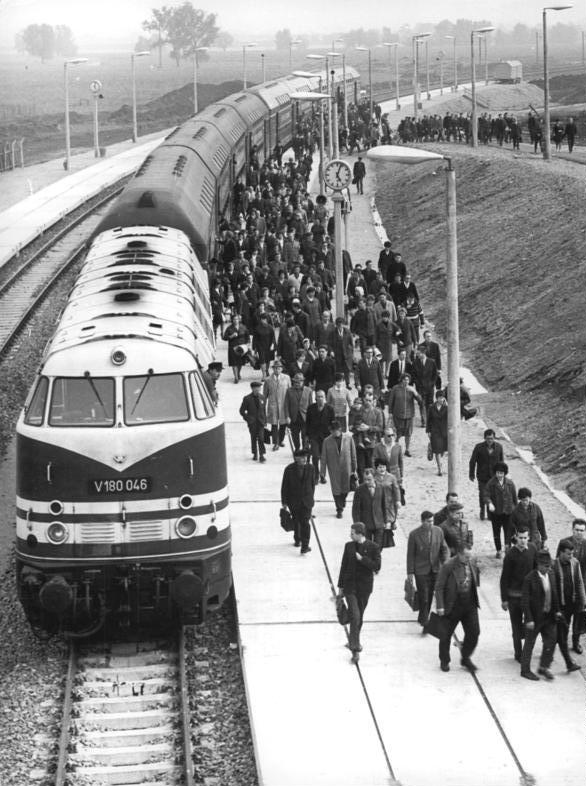
1967 – New Halle-Neustadt station (now: Halle Zscherbener Straße)

The Bad Lauchstädt–Benkendorf–Angersdorf line, which branched from the Merseburg–Schafstädt railway and was opened in 1896, was mostly used for local freight transport. In 1944/45, it was used as a diversion route when railways and bridges over the Saale in the Merseburg area were damaged in the war, but it subsequently lost its already limited passenger traffic.

During the implementation of the 1958 chemical program of the GDR, on the one hand chemical sites at the Buna Works and Leuna Works were massively expanded and, on the other hand, the planned dormitory suburb of Chemiearbeiterstadt Halle-West (later Halle-Neustadt) was completely redeveloped from 1964. Construction of a new rail link between the new residential and workplaces began on 2 January 1966. The continuous Bad Lauchstädt–Angersdorf railway was replaced by the new link, which was opened on 24 April 1967. The new Buna-Werke station had already been served two days earlier by some trains on the Merseburg–Schafstädt railway.

Passenger services ran on the new line from Weißenfels via Großkorbetha, Leuna-Werke, Merseburg, Buna-Werke and Halle-Neustadt to Halle-Nietleben. Commuter trains for chemical workers (known as Pelzerzügen, literally "fur worker trains") were operated each day in the 1980s to carry about 9,600 workers between Halle-Neustadt and the Buna works. Each train carried up to 1,200 passengers. The trains were each made up of three articulated sets of four double-deck carriages. The length of the platforms was adapted to the length of the train.

Similar trains were also operated on the Halle–Merseburg–Leuna-Werke–Weißenfels route on the Thuringian Railway. The two services were both listed in table 601 of the timetable until 1992.

Operations at the Buna Works changed after the Wende in 1989/90. With the takeover by Dow Chemical, modern production facilities were built, old ones were shut down and demolished. Due to the associated substantial reduction in employment, passenger numbers on the line also fell significantly. Services on the Merseburg–Schafstädt railway were numbered 588 in the timetable issued in 1992.

In the end, trains only consisted of a class 143 electric locomotive and a double-deck driving trailer. They were used only for commuter traffic from Monday to Friday in the morning and the afternoon. The journey time for the six train pairs a day between Merseburg and Halle-Nietleben was 22 minutes. Passenger services were abandoned at the timetable change on 9 December 2007, but the last trains had run two days earlier.

The section from Holleben (near the junction with the Halle–Hann. Münden railway) until shortly before the S-Bahn halt of Halle Zscherbener Straße, on which only a few freight trains operated in 2010 (carrying bulk material for track maintenance to Nietleben station, where it was stored), was closed in 2011. The Federal Railway Authority (Eisenbahn-Bundesamt) approved DB Netz’s application to close the line with effect from 31 August 2011.

== Current operations ==
The stations of Halle-Nietleben, Halle-Neustadt and Halle Zscherbener Straße are served by line S3 of the S-Bahn Mitteldeutschland.

In freight transport, the line remains important for connecting the Buna Works.
