= Miesterhorst station =

Railway station in Germany

Miesterhorst
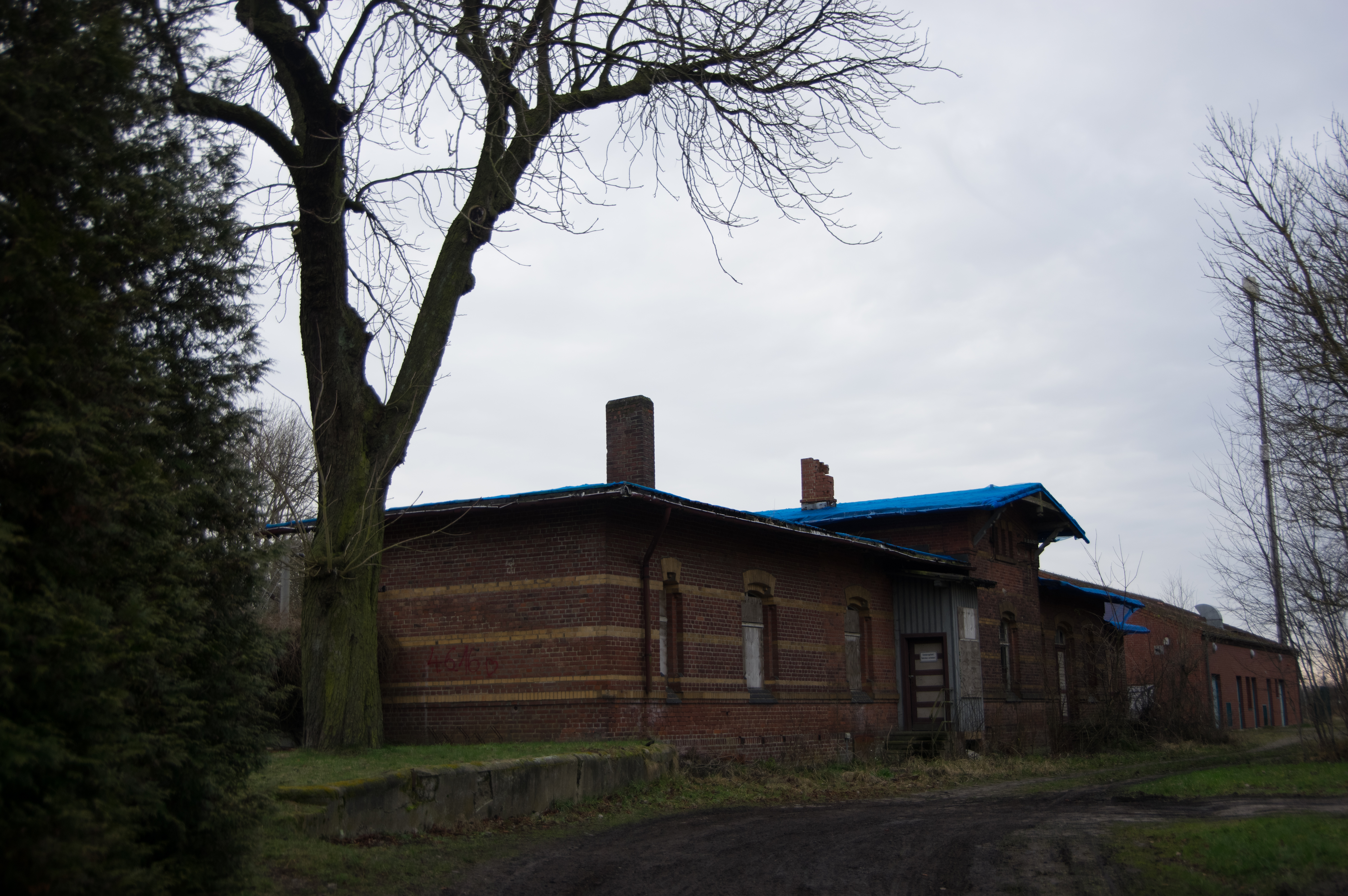
- Miesterhorst station building

General information
- Location: Miesterhorst, Saxony-Anhalt; Germany
- Coordinates: 52°27′59″N 11°07′19″E
- Line: Berlin–Lehrte (KBS 202)
- Platforms: 2

Other information
- Station code: 4105
- DS100 code: LMT
- Category: 7

Services
Preceding station	Abellio Rail Mitteldeutschland	Following station
Oebisfelde towards Wolfsburg Hbf	RB 35	Mieste towards Stendal Hbf
Location
- Location within Saxony-Anhalt

Miesterhorst (German: Bahnhof Miesterhorst) is a railway station located in Miesterhorst, Germany. The station is located on the Berlin-Lehrte Railway. The train services are operated by Deutsche Bahn.

== Train services ==
The station is serves by the following service(s):

- Local services RB 35 Wolfsburg - Stendal
