= Solpke station =

Railway station in Germany

Solpke

General information
- Location: Solpke, Saxony-Anhalt; Germany
- Coordinates: 52°30′01″N 11°17′40″E
- Line: Berlin–Lehrte (KBS 202)
- Platforms: 2

Other information
- Station code: 5891
- DS100 code: LSK
- Category: 7

Services
Preceding station	Abellio Rail Mitteldeutschland	Following station
Mieste towards Wolfsburg Hbf	RB 35	Gardelegen towards Stendal Hbf
Location
- Location within Saxony-Anhalt

Solpke (German: Bahnhof Solpke) is a railway station located in Solpke, Germany. The station is located on the Berlin-Lehrte Railway. The train services are operated by Deutsche Bahn.

== Train services ==
The station is serves by the following service(s):

- Local services RB 35 Wolfsburg - Stendal
