= Dessau–Köthen railway =

German railway line

Overview
- Line number: 6419
- Locale: Saxony-Anhalt, Germany

Service
- Route number: 334

Technical
- Line length: 21.2 km (13.2 mi)
- Track gauge: 1,435 mm (4 ft 8 1/2 in) standard gauge
- Operating speed: 100 km/h (62 mph) (maximum)

The Dessau–Köthen railway connects the cities of Dessau-Roßlau and Köthen in the German state of Saxony-Anhalt. It is one of the oldest lines in Germany and forms the western end of the main line of the Berlin-Anhalt Railway Company (German: Berlin-Anhaltische Eisenbahn-Gesellschaft, BAE). The only passenger services to use the line are regional services.

== History ==
The Dessau–Köthen line opened on 1 September 1840 as the first section of the Anhalt Railway. On 10 September 1841 the line was completed to Berlin. Regular long-distance services ran between Berlin and Köthen. Two daily services ran between Dessau and Köthen. With the opening of direct Dessau–Leipzig and Wittenberg–Halle lines in 1859, the Dessau–Köthen increasingly lost its importance. The line lost almost all of its freight traffic with the opening of the nearby Canon Railway in 1879.

In 1870/71 the BAE and the Magdeburg-Halberstadt Railway Company (MHE) opened a new Köthen station in Georgstraße. In 1863, the MHE had acquired the Köthen–Bernburg line, which had opened in 1846. The Magdeburg-Leipzig Railway continued to use its separate station in Köthen. In 1916 a new central railway station was opened in Köthen for all lines, slightly to the east of the 1870/71 station, requiring only limited rebuilding of trackwork. During this period most of the level crossings in Köthen were replaced by bridges. At this time water tower to the east of the station, which is still preserved, was built. In the 1880s the route was nationalised and transferred to the Prussian State Railways.

As part of reparations to the Soviet Union as a result of World War II, the second track of the Dessau-Köthen line was removed and, in contrast to the lines to Bernburg, Magdeburg and Leipzig, was never rebuilt. The Deutsche Reichsbahn (the former East German Railways) sought in 1992 to rebuild the second track and to electrify the line along with the Bernburg line, because of their significance for freight traffic. However, even the freight traffic faded away during the post-Communist period. So the plans for electrification and duplication have been abandoned. Overall, the route has been modernised since the Deutsche Reichsbahn was merged into Deutsche Bahn in 1994 only sparingly, so that most of the old mechanical interlocking technology still exists.

== Route ==
The route begins in Dessau Hauptbahnhof, which has Regionalbahn connections with Magdeburg, Wittenberg, Halle ( Saale) and Leipzig, as well as a Regional-Express service to Berlin. Regionalbahn trains operate from platform 6. After a few metres, the line separates from the mainline to Bitterfeld. In Dessau it passes over a level crossings at Kühnauer Straße and Brauereistraße. In this section, there are several, mostly unused, industrial sidings. Further on, the line passes under Hermann-Köhl-Straße and a siding to the former Polysius AG factory. The line reaches Alten district. On the right is the airfield of the former Junkers factory. Shortly after passing over a level crossing of the Hünefeldstrasse is Alten station. Further on an industrial and commercial centre has been built on part of the former Junkers site, but without sidings. After a few kilometres of running through open countryside, the line reaches Mosigkau station and shortly later crosses Erich-Weinert-Strasse. The next station is at Elsnigk, which is now much too big for its small patronage. The line then goes onto the rolling plain around Köthen. Running partly on embankments, the line reaches Osternienburg station (closed in 2022 due to low patronage) in the locality of Sibbesdorf. Shortly before Köthen the line crosses Highway 187a to Aken on one of the few modernised level crossings. A little later, the line from Aken converges from the north, but continues on its own parallel track to Köthen. Shortly before Köthen, both tracks runs below Elsdorfer Weg, as well as, somewhat later, the Magdeburg–Halle (Saale) main line. The line now turns to the south on the eastern side of the Magdeburg–Halle line, passing in Köthen over the streets of Dessauer Straße, Friedrichstrasse and Friedrich-Ebert-Straße and finally reaching Köthen station. Trains stop at the platforms 1, 2 and 3. There are connections to Intercity trains towards Leipzig and Magdeburg (continuing to Oldenburg or Cologne), as well as regional trains to Halle and Magdeburg.

== Operations ==
Trains on the line have been operated since 2004 by the Elbe-Saale-Bahn, a subsidiary of Deutsche Bahn, since winning a tender to operate the Altmark-Börde-Anhalt network, with class 642 diesel multiple units (Siemens Desiro Classic) running as Regionalbahn services hourly. The trains continue on the Bernburg line to Aschersleben. The line has a small amount of freight traffic.
