= Berlin-Blankenheim railway =

Railway line in Germany

Berlin–Blankenheim or Wetzlar Railway
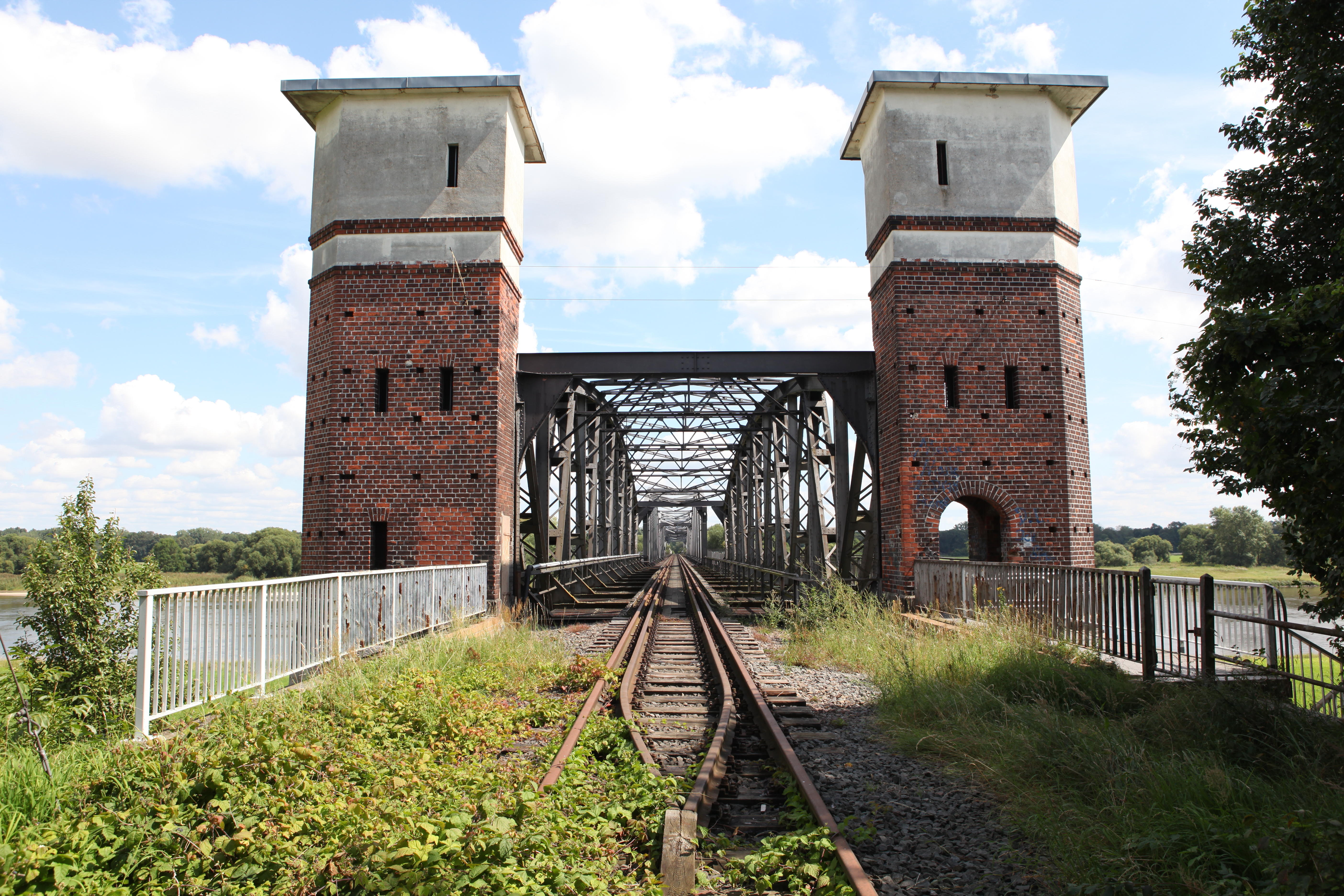

Overview
- Native name: Wetzlarer Bahn
- Line number: 6118; 6024 (S-Bahn)
- Locale: Berlin, Brandenburg and Saxony-Anhalt, Germany

Service
- Route number: 200.7, 207, ex258, 335

Technical
- Line length: 188.1 km (116.9 mi)
- Track gauge: 1,435 mm (4 ft 8 1/2 in) standard gauge
- Electrification: Berlin S-Bahn: 750 V third rail; Berlin–Wiesenburg: 15 kV/16.7 Hz AC overhead catenary

The Berlin-Blankenheim railway or Wetzlarer Bahn ("Wetzlar Railway") is a railway line in the German states of Berlin, Brandenburg and Saxony-Anhalt. It is a section of the Kanonenbahn (Cannons Railway) between Berlin and Metz, built between 1877 and 1882. Wetzlar used to be an important rail junction on the Kanonenbahn. The Berlin-Blankenheim line originally ran from Berlin, via Bad Belzig, Güsten, Sandersleben to Blankenheim, where a remnant of it still joins the Halle–Kassel line. The Wiesenburg–Güsten section has carried no traffic since 2004 and is now closed. Only the Berlin–Wiesenburg section is electrified. The Sandersleben–Blankenheim section has only a single track, while the remainder of the still-operating parts of the line is duplicated.

== History ==
The track was built at the instigation of the Prussian government between 1877 and 1882 as a direct militarily strategic railway, bypassing urban areas, connecting to Alsace-Lorraine, which had been acquired from France as a result of the War of 1870-71. The Berlin–Blankenheim section was the longest section of the Kanonenbahn that did not use existing lines. The building of the line away from urban areas was a disadvantage from the outset as there was little regular traffic on the line, except on a few of its sections. For long-distance traffic between Berlin and western and south-western Germany, other routes via Magdeburg, and Halle or Leipzig were more important.

In 1923, a connection was opened from Wiesenburg to Roßlau near Dessau. The section from Berlin to Wiesenburg was upgraded, but the Wiesenburg-Güsten section lost importance, since in addition to routes via Magdeburg, routes via Dessau were now available.

In 1961, the section from Drewitz (now Potsdam Medienstadt Babelsberg) to Berlin–Wannsee was closed to passenger traffic, as a result of the building of the Berlin Wall. Interzonal trains between Berlin and West Germany were rerouted via Potsdam. For freight transport this section was of great importance especially due to the Seddin freight depot.

In the 1980s it was planned to upgrade the line as an alternative to the congested Bitterfeld–Naumburg line for freight. Catenary stanchions for electrification were established in the Güterglück and Blankenheim areas, but no further work was carried out. Instead, the Güterglück–Berlin section was duplicated and electrified up to 1993. It was used by Intercity-Express and Intercity trains during construction work on the Berlin-Potsdam-Magdeburg line completed on 14 December 1995. For this purpose, some sections had been upgraded for a top speed of 160 km/h.

The Wiesenburg–Güsten section then experienced a gradual decline. In 1998, Regionalbahn trains stopped running between Barby and Güsten and instead ran between Güsten and Magdeburg. There still remained an InterRegio train from Berlin via Wernigerode to Aachen and a Berlin–Wernigerode weekend escape train. In 1999, these trains were canceled or diverted, leaving the Barby–Güsten section without traffic. The diversion of regional trains to Magdeburg was not successful and by 2002 only two pairs of trains on weekends were still operating; on 13 December 2003 all services were discontinued. At the same time was freight operations between Wiesenburg and Güterglück were moved to the Brandenburg–Magdeburg line. On 11 December 2004, the line was closed.

=== Developments in recent years ===
The Berlin–Bad Belzig–Wiesenburg section has been served for several years by Regional-Express services (currently line RE 7) running hourly to Dessau via Bad Belzig (only every two hours from Bad Belzig to Dessau at weekends, however). Long-distance trains were gradually reduced. With the opening of the line under the Berlin Tiergarten and the commencement of Intercity trains via Wittenberg, the last two inter-city trains via Dessau were terminated in December 2007. Since then only a few night trains run via Dessau. In contrast, traffic is dense in the Berlin area. Regional services RB 22 and MR 33 (operated by Märkische Regiobahn) run between Wannsee and Michendorf or Michendorf and Seddin. In the Berlin suburbs, all S-Bahn, regional and mainline services to Potsdam run on the Berlin-Blankenheim line.

The section from Wiesenburg to Güsten is now closed. Only two short sections at Barby and Calbe are still served by regional or freight traffic. Güsten station and its former depot has been scaled back considerably. Between Güsten and Sangerhausen Regional–Express services run every two hours on the Magdeburg–Erfurt route.
