= Magdeburg–Leipzig railway =

Railway line in Germany

Magdeburg–Halle (Saale)–Leipzig railway
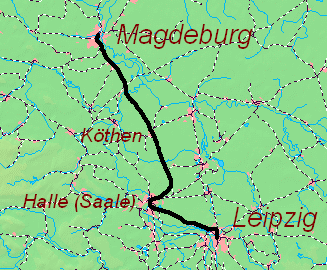

Overview
- Line number: 6403 Magdeburg–Leipzig Messe Süd; 6053 Halle–Gröbers-Süd
- Locale: Saxony-Anhalt and Saxony, Germany

Service
- Route number: 340

Technical
- Line length: 119.2 km (74.1 mi)
- Track gauge: 1,435 mm (4 ft 8 1/2 in) standard gauge
- Electrification: 15 kV/16.7 Hz AC catenary
- Operating speed: 160 km/h (99 mph) (maximum)

The Magdeburg–Leipzig railway is a double-track, electrified railway in the German states of Saxony-Anhalt and Saxony, connecting Magdeburg via Köthen and Halle to Leipzig.

== History ==
The line was built by the Magdeburg–Leipzig Railway Company (German: Magdeburg–Leipziger Eisenbahn-Gesellschaft), with construction starting on 24 January 1838. It was the first German railway that passed through several countries, in addition to the kingdoms of Prussia (Magdeburg, Halle) and Saxony (Leipzig), it also crossed the Duchy of Anhalt-Köthen. Opening dates:

- 29 June 1839: Magdeburg–Schönebeck (14.9 km)
- 9 September 1839: Schönebeck–Saale bridge near Calbe (12.4 km)
- 19 June 1840: Saale bridge–Köthen (22.6 km)
- 22 July 1840: Halle–Köthen (35.7 km)
- 18 August 1840: Halle–Leipzig (33.2 km)

Finally on 18 August 1840 the whole line from Magdeburg to Leipzig was opened. As the Magdeburg station in Leipzig was adjacent to the Dresden station, passengers between Magdeburg and Dresden (the Leipzig–Dresden railway opened in 1837) changed trains here. Later a short connecting line was built for the transfer of coaches. Between Halle and Leipzig the line passed from Prussia to Saxony. The section of the line in Saxony was operated under contract by the Leipzig–Dresden Railway Company. On 29 April 1874, the Magdeburg–Leipzig Railway Company purchased the Saxon section of the line with effect from 1 January 1875. Duplication of the line from Magdeburg Leipzig, which had started in 1842, was completed on 15 January 1843. On 1 November 1843 regular freight services commenced.

In 1873 a line opened to connect Magdeburg's two stations. Magdeburg's walls prevented a joint station being built. There was a station for trains to Wittenberge and Hamburg with the Leipziger station serving trains on the Magdeburg-Leipzig line and trains to Berlin, Braunschweig and Halberstadt.

On 1 June 1876 the Magdeburg–Leipzig Railway Company was taken over by the Magdeburg–Halberstadt Railway Company, which was nationalized by Prussia under an act of 20 December 1879. The Magdeburg–Leipzig line came under the management of the Königliche preußischen Eisenbahndirektion Magdeburg (Royal Prussian railway directorate of Magdeburg). From 1 April 1895 it came under the management of the new railway directorate of Halle-Leipzig.

On 1 May 1912 the Prussian part of the Leipzig Hauptbahnhof was opened, leading to the closure of the Magdeburger station. On 1 April 1920, the Magdeburg-Leipzig line went along with the other German state railways was merged into Deutsche Reichseisenbahnen (German Railways), which on 30 August 1924 became Deutsche Reichsbahn-Gesellschaft (German Railway Company).

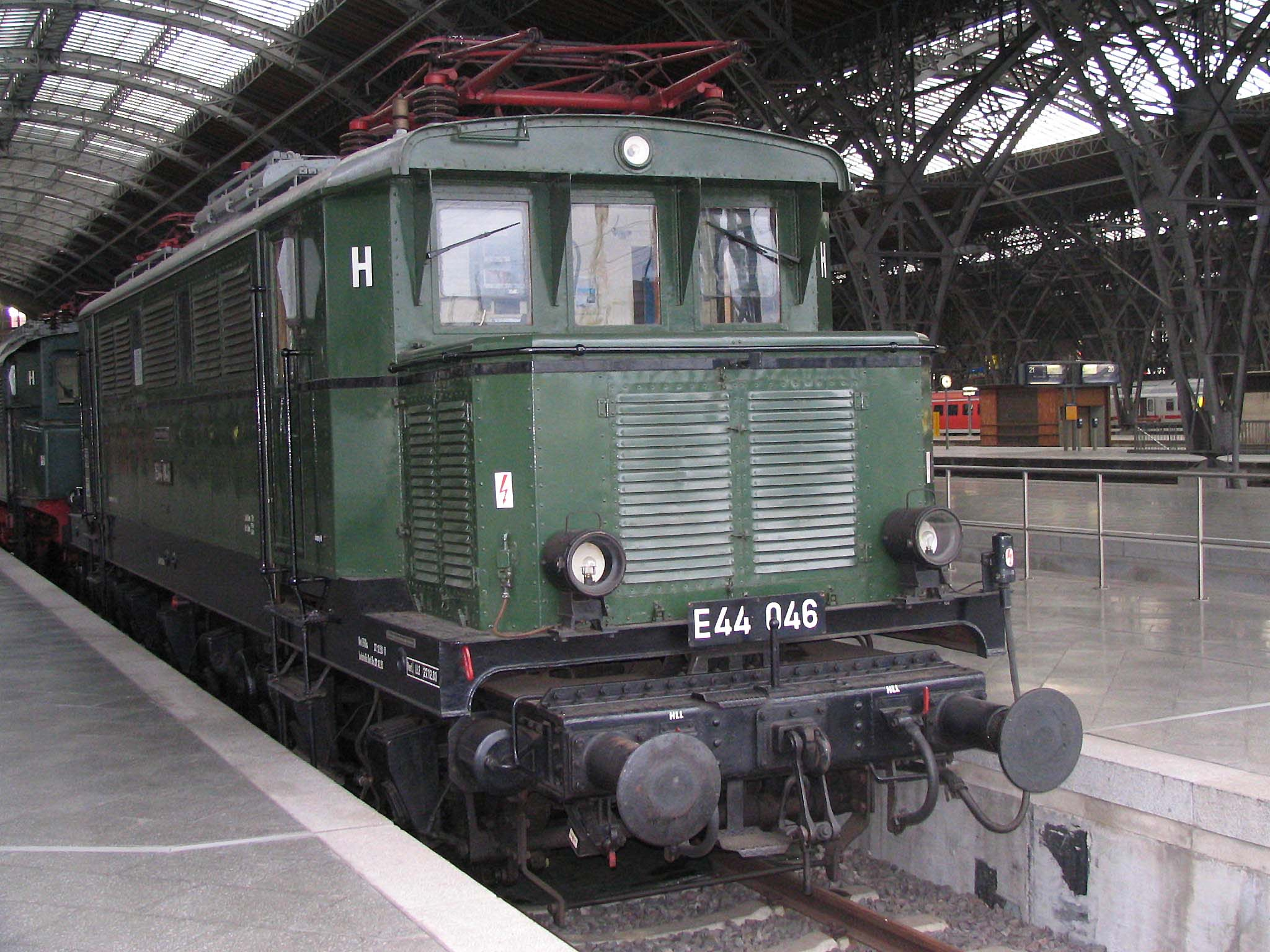
E 44 046 at Leipzig Hbf, one of the electric locomotives introduced in the 1950s

In 1920 electrification of the section between Halle and Leipzig began, with the first electric locomotive operating on it on 19 December 1922. Electrification from Magdeburg to Leipzig was completed on 7 October 1934. In 1946, the electrical installations were dismantled as reparations. On 1 September 1955, electric trains started running again between Halle and Köthen, after the Soviet Union returned some electric locomotives. Electrification was restored between Köthen and Schönebeck on 29 December 1955, between Schönebeck and Magdeburg on 12 January 1957, and the final section between Leipzig and Halle on 20 December 1958.

== Operations ==
Currently, the section between Magdeburg and Halle is served by Regionalbahn trains that run hourly and are made up of three double-deck carriages with control cars and propelled by class 143 electric locomotives. Trains on line S1 of the Mittelelbe S-Bahn between Magdeburg and Schönebeck, run between Magdeburg Hauptbahnhof and Magdeburg-Buckau on separate tracks. This service is operated with class 425 EMUs, which were modernised in 2015. Furthermore, the line is used Regional-Express services every two hours to Erfurt and every two hours between Magdeburg and Schönebeck by Regional-Express services to Aschersleben.

Lines S3 and S5X of the S-Bahn Mitteldeutschland run between Halle and Gröbers or Wahren with Bombardier Talent 2 multiple units. The S5X service to Gröbers runs on the mainline tracks and then uses the Erfurt–Leipzig/Halle high-speed railway towards Leipzig/Halle Airport.

In addition InterCity trains on IC lines 56 and 55 operate together providing an hourly service, stopping only in Magdeburg Hbf, Köthen, Halle Hbf, Leipzig/Halle Airport and Leipzig Hbf. Between Gröbers and Leipzig Hbf, these trains on the Erfurt–Leipzig/Halle high-speed railway. The line also carried significant freight traffic.
