= Bitterfeld station =

Railway station in Bitterfeld-Wolfen, Germany

Bitterfeld
- Platform and entrance building. The building was opened in 2025.

General information
- Location: Bahnhofstr. 1, Bitterfeld, Bitterfeld-Wolfen, Saxony-Anhalt; Germany
- Coordinates: 51°37′26″N 12°18′57″E
- Owner: Deutsche Bahn
- Operator: DB Netz; DB Station&Service
- Lines: Berlin–Halle km 131.6; Trebnitz–Leipzig km 48.5; Bitterfeld–Stumsdorf km 0.0
- Platforms: 6

Construction
- Accessible: Yes

Other information
- Station code: 680
- DS100 code: LBT
- IBNR: 8010050
- Category: 3
- Fare zone: MDV: 683 (Note: Both zones 263 and 264. As this zone is in the "MDV Nord" area, MDV fares only apply to rail transport.)
- Website: www.bahnhof.de

History
- Opened: 17 August 1857; 169 years ago
- Electrified: 1911-1914 (Note: Since 1915 catenaries were dismantled to recover copper for war production.); 1922-1946 (Note: From 1946 catenaries and overhead line masts were dismantled as Soviet war reparations.); 9 June 1958; 68 years ago

Services
Preceding station	DB Fernverkehr	Following station
Lutherstadt Wittenberg Hbf towards Berlin Gesundbrunnen	ICE 11	Halle (Saale) Hbf One-way operation
Lutherstadt Wittenberg Hbf towards Berlin Gesundbrunnen	ICE 11	Leipzig Hbf towards München Hbf
Lutherstadt Wittenberg Hbf towards Berlin Gesundbrunnen	ICE 18	Leipzig Hbf towards München Hbf
Leipzig Hbf towards München Hbf	ICE 28	Berlin Südkreuz towards Hamburg-Altona
Preceding station	DB Regio Südost	Following station
Wolfen towards Magdeburg Hbf	RE 13	Delitzsch unt Bf towards Leipzig Hbf
Preceding station	Mitteldeutschland S-Bahn	Following station
Greppin towards Dessau Hbf or Lutherstadt Wittenberg Hbf	S 2	Petersroda towards Leipzig-Stötteritz
Roitzsch towards Halle (Saale) Hbf	S 8	Muldenstein towards Lutherstadt Wittenberg Hbf
Location
- Location within Saxony-Anhalt Location within Germany Location within Europe

Bitterfeld station is a station in the town of Bitterfeld in the German state of Saxony-Anhalt. In 1857 the station was opened with the Trebnitz–Leipzig railway. Since the full commissioning of the line from Berlin to Halle, both lines have crossed in Bitterfeld. Subsequently, the line to Stumsdorf was also opened. Today, Bitterfeld is a long-distance station, which is served at two-hour intervals by ICEs from Berlin to Munich.

== Location ==
Bitterfeld station lies on the western edge of the residential part of Bitterfeld, which was an independent town until its merger into Bitterfeld-Wolfen in 2007. The centre of Bitterfeld is located about one kilometre further east. The adjacent streets are Bahnhofstraße and Schwarze Weg.

It is a junction station with lines running in four directions. The Berlin–Halle (running northeast–southwest) and Trebnitz–Leipzig (running north–south) lines cross in it. For more than three kilometres both lines run parallel. The nearest stations in all four directions are Greppin, Muldenstein, Petersroda and Roitzsch.

== History ==
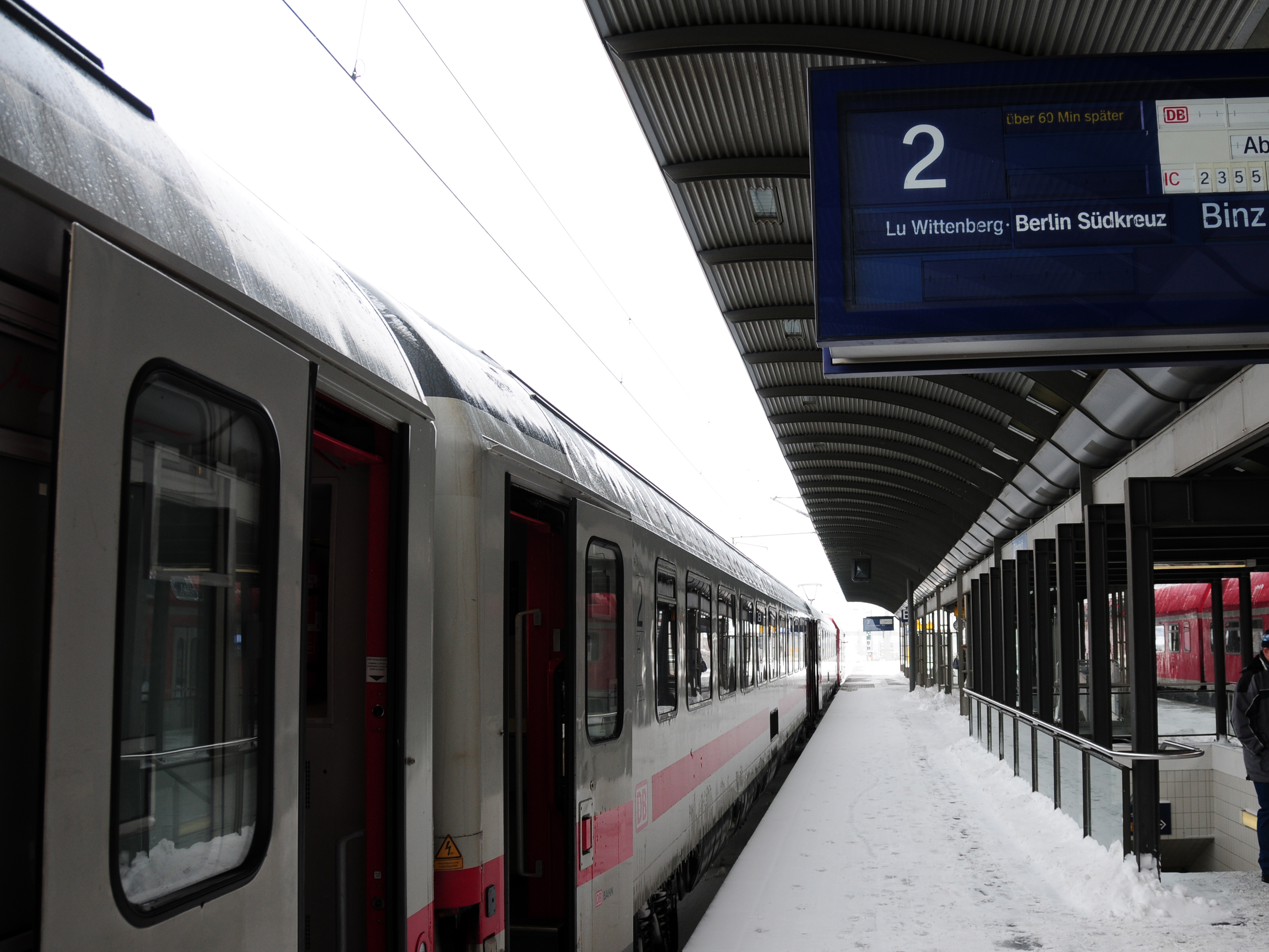
Intercity service (2010)

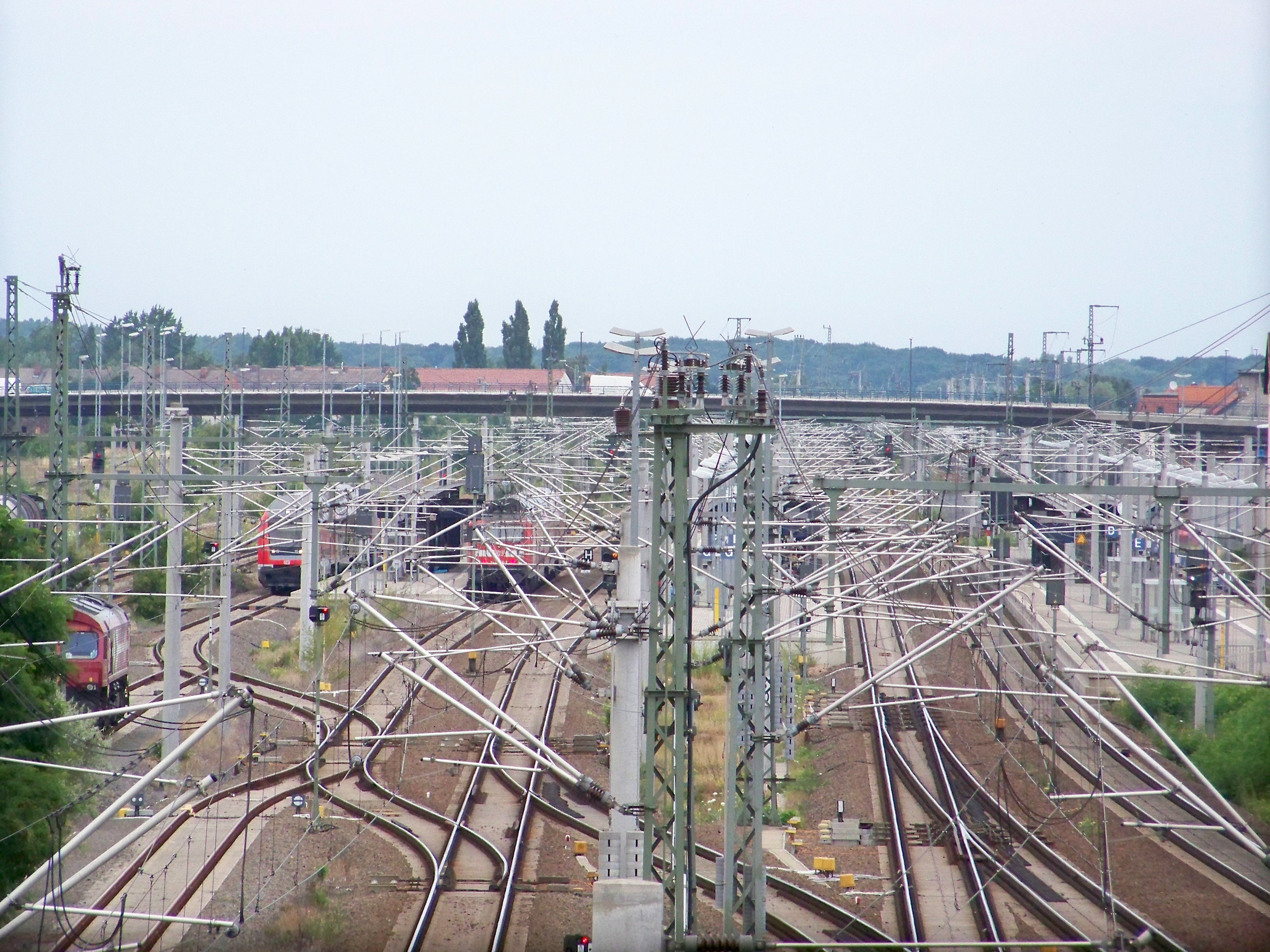
Looking to the north (2009)

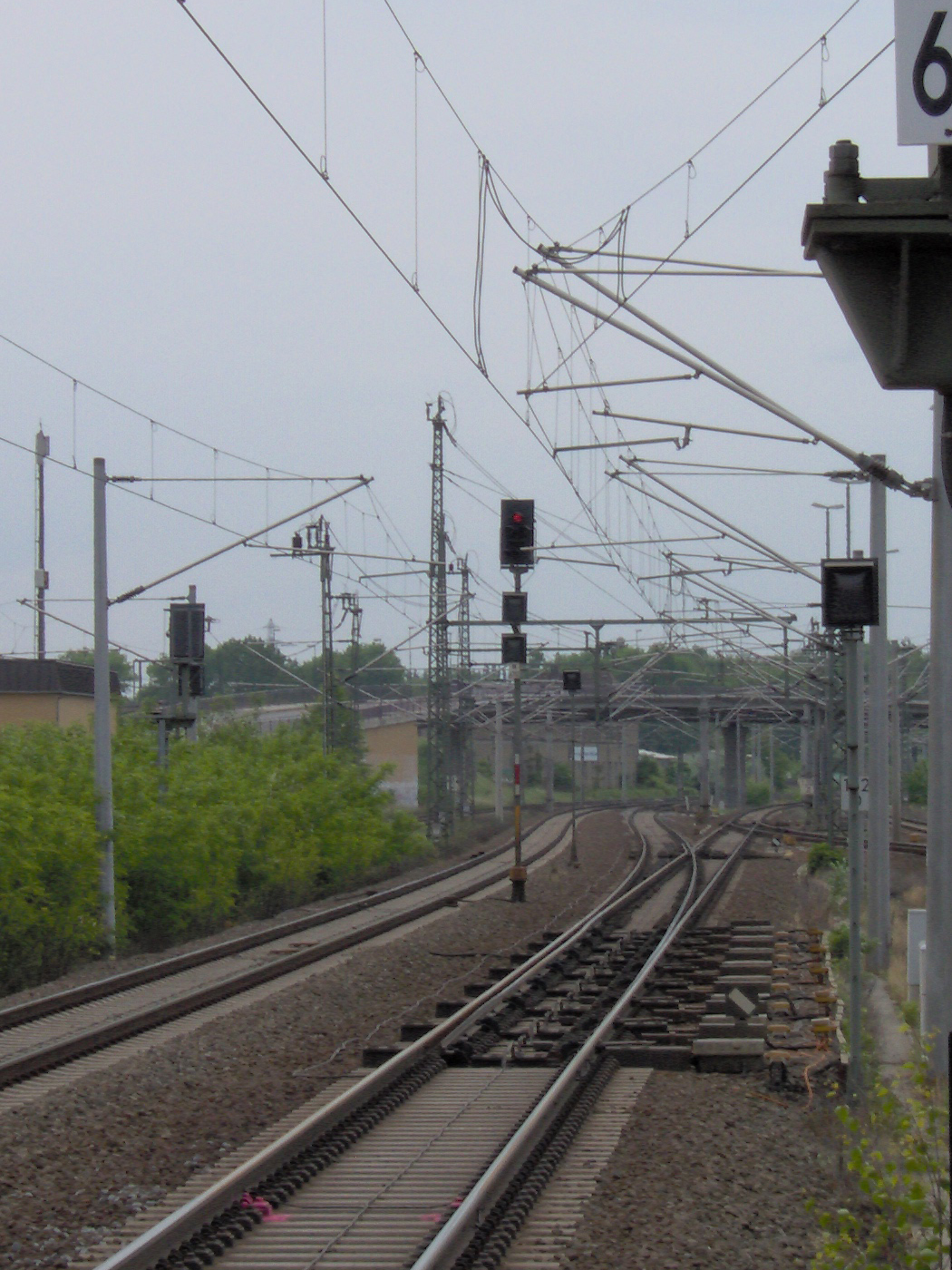
High speed points (2008)

Bitterfeld station was opened on 17 August 1857. The entrance building was built between the railway tracks. A water tower was built in 1890. Six years later, bridges were built over the tracks. Two island platforms and signal boxes designated as "Mbd", "Swt" and "Not" were also built. The freight shed was expanded in 1907. The branch line to Stumsdorf was opened on 1 October 1910. The station was electrified and electric trains ran to Dessau for the first time on 18 January 1911. Electrification of the line to Delitzsch was completed on 5 December 1913. Further signal boxes, designated as "Rtl", "Rtll" and "Zd", were built for shunting operations in 1917. Numerous sidings were connected to Bitterfeld station. After the First World War, electrical operations to Leipzig resumed on 27 September 1921. A new roundhouse where locomotives were heated (Heizhaus) was completed at the north end of the station in 1930. Toward the end of the Second World War, freight operations came to a standstill from March 1945, since the bridge over the Mulde had been blown up. This was not reopened until 23 February 1949. The infrastructure for the electrification in the station had to be dismantled for reparations in 1946. The first electric trains to run through the station after the war ran to Roßlau on 15 March 1958.

The Bitterfeld railway node extended for three kilometres and had nearly 400 employees. 40 trains were formed and 30 were broken up each day. The entire station was divided into three supervisory areas: "freight yard north", "freight yard south" and "passenger station". Two shunting locomotives were constantly used for the connecting sidings.

On 27 November 1977, there was a boiler explosion in Bitterfeld, which killed nine people.

Up to 1999, extensive reconstruction work took place on the entrance building and in the station forecourt. With the changes following the end of Communism, the freight traffic in Bitterfeld decreased significantly, so that many goods tracks and signal boxes were closed by 2000. The entire remodeling and reconstruction of the station cost about DM 180 million. Platforms 1–6 along with their canopies, the track layout and the entrance building were renewed. In addition, the station received a new bus station and a redesigned station forecourt. It has a diesel locomotive on exhibition, which is operated by a local model railway company.

== Infrastructure ==
Its network of tracks once included a total of 87 tracks. In addition, there were sidings connecting to local companies, two humps and other loading roads.

There was also a semi-circular roundhouse with 16 tracks and a coal-loading facility with 980 metres of sidings.

Today, Bitterfeld station has a total of six platforms. Platforms one to four are 370 meters long and the other two are 140 metres long. Their heights are 76 and 55 centimetres, respectively.

The entrance building, which is to the east of the tracks, and the station forecourt are owned by Deutsche Bahn (2016).

== Connections ==
Line	Route		Interval (min)	Operator
ICE 11	Berlin Gesundbrunnen – Berlin – Bitterfeld – Frankfurt – Stuttgart – Munich		A few daily trains	DB Fernverkehr
ICE 18	Berlin Gesundbrunnen – Berlin – Bitterfeld – Leipzig – Nuremberg – Augsburg – Munich		Once a day	DB Fernverkehr
ICE 28	Hamburg-Altona – Hamburg – Berlin – Bitterfeld – Leipzig – Erfurt – Bamberg – Nuremberg – Munich		120	DB Fernverkehr
RE 13	Magdeburg – Biederitz – Zerbst – Roßlau – Dessau – Wolfen – Bitterfeld – Delitzsch – Leipzig		60	DB Regio Südost
S 2	Leipzig-Stötteritz – Leipzig – Delitzsch – Bitterfeld –	Wolfen – Dessau	30 (Leipzig–Bitterfeld Mon–Fri); 60 (Leipzig–Bitterfeld Sat–Sun); 120 (Bitterfeld–Dessau); 120 (Bitterfeld–Wittenberg)	DB Regio Südost
S 2	Leipzig-Stötteritz – Leipzig – Delitzsch – Bitterfeld –	Gräfenhainichen – Wittenberg (– Jüterbog)	30 (Leipzig–Bitterfeld Mon–Fri); 60 (Leipzig–Bitterfeld Sat–Sun); 120 (Bitterfeld–Dessau); 120 (Bitterfeld–Wittenberg)	DB Regio Südost
S 8	Halle – Landsberg – Bitterfeld –	Wolfen – Dessau	30 (Halle–Bitterfeld Mon–Fri); 60 (Halle–Bitterfeld Sat–Sun); 120 (Bitterfeld–Dessau); 120 (Bitterfeld–Wittenberg)	DB Regio Südost
S 8	Halle – Landsberg – Bitterfeld –	Gräfenhainichen – Wittenberg (– Jüterbog)	30 (Halle–Bitterfeld Mon–Fri); 60 (Halle–Bitterfeld Sat–Sun); 120 (Bitterfeld–Dessau); 120 (Bitterfeld–Wittenberg)	DB Regio Südost

At hourly intervals services on state bus route 434 run to Stumsdorf via Zörbig. This route was established after the cancellation of the passenger services on the Bitterfeld–Stumsdorf railway.
