= Dessau Süd station =

Railway stop in Dessau-Roßlau, Germany

Dessau Süd
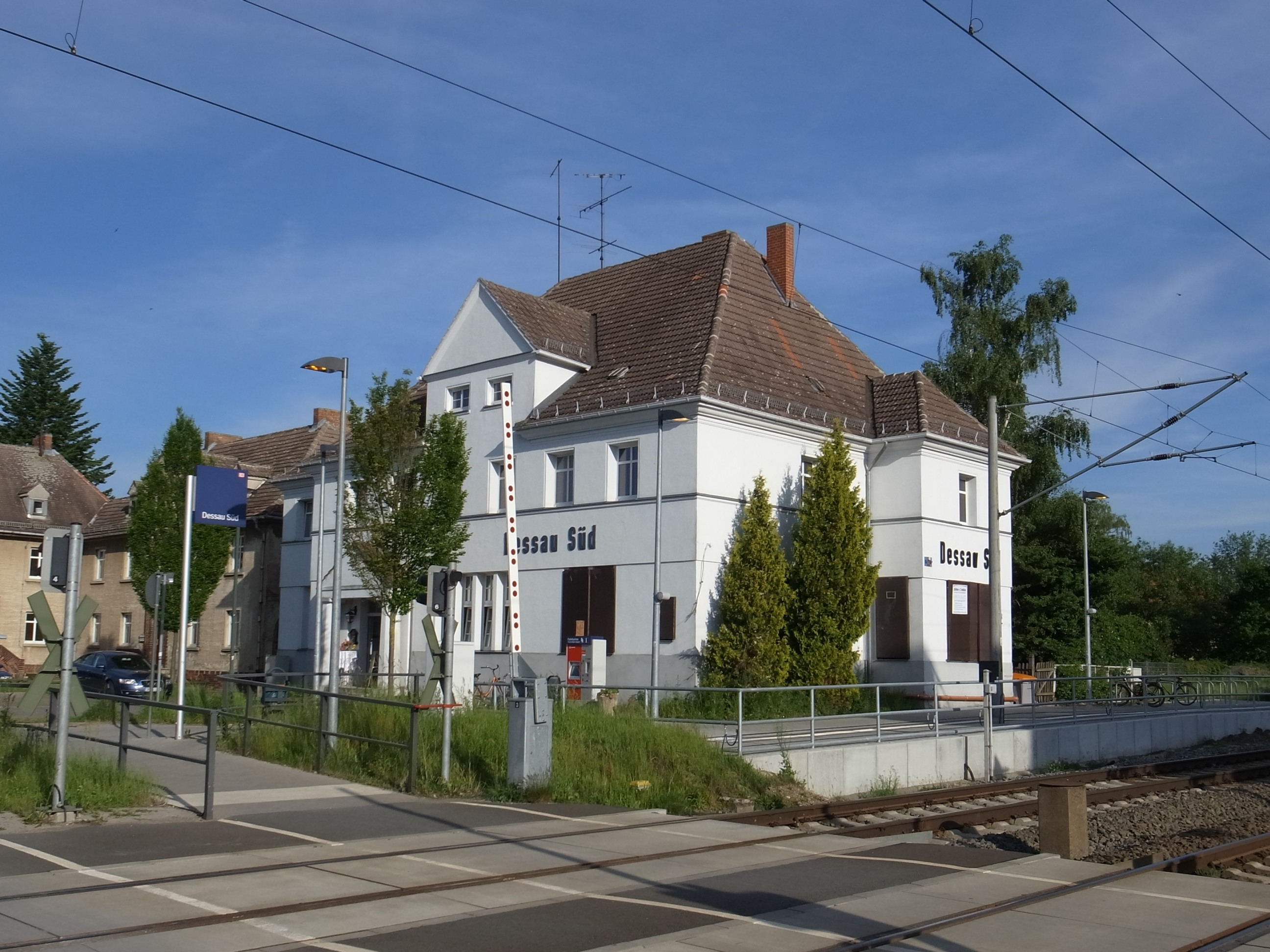
- 2014

General information
- Location: Peterholzstraße 16; 06844 Dessau; Saxony-Anhalt; Germany
- Coordinates: 51.8023°N 12.2366°E
- System: Bf
- Owner: DB Netz
- Operator: DB Station&Service
- Lines: Trebnitz–Leipzig railway (KBS 251)
- Platforms: 2 side platforms
- Tracks: 2
- Train operators: S-Bahn Mitteldeutschland

Construction
- Parking: yes
- Cycle facilities: yes
- Accessible: yes

Other information
- Station code: 1174
- DS100 code: LDS
- IBNR: 8011361
- Category: 6
- Fare zone: MDV: 270 (Note: As this zone is in the "MDV Nord" area, MDV fares only apply to rail transport.)
- Website: www.bahnhof.de

Services
Preceding station	Mitteldeutschland S-Bahn	Following station
Dessau Hbf Terminus	S 2	Marke towards Leipzig-Stötteritz
Marke towards Halle (Saale) Hbf	S 8	Dessau Hbf towards Lutherstadt Wittenberg Hbf
Location
- Location within Saxony-Anhalt Location within Germany Location within Europe

Dessau Süd station is a railway station in the southern part of Dessau, Saxony-Anhalt, Germany.
