= Dessau Hauptbahnhof =

Railway station in Dessau-Roßlau, Germany

Dessau Hbf
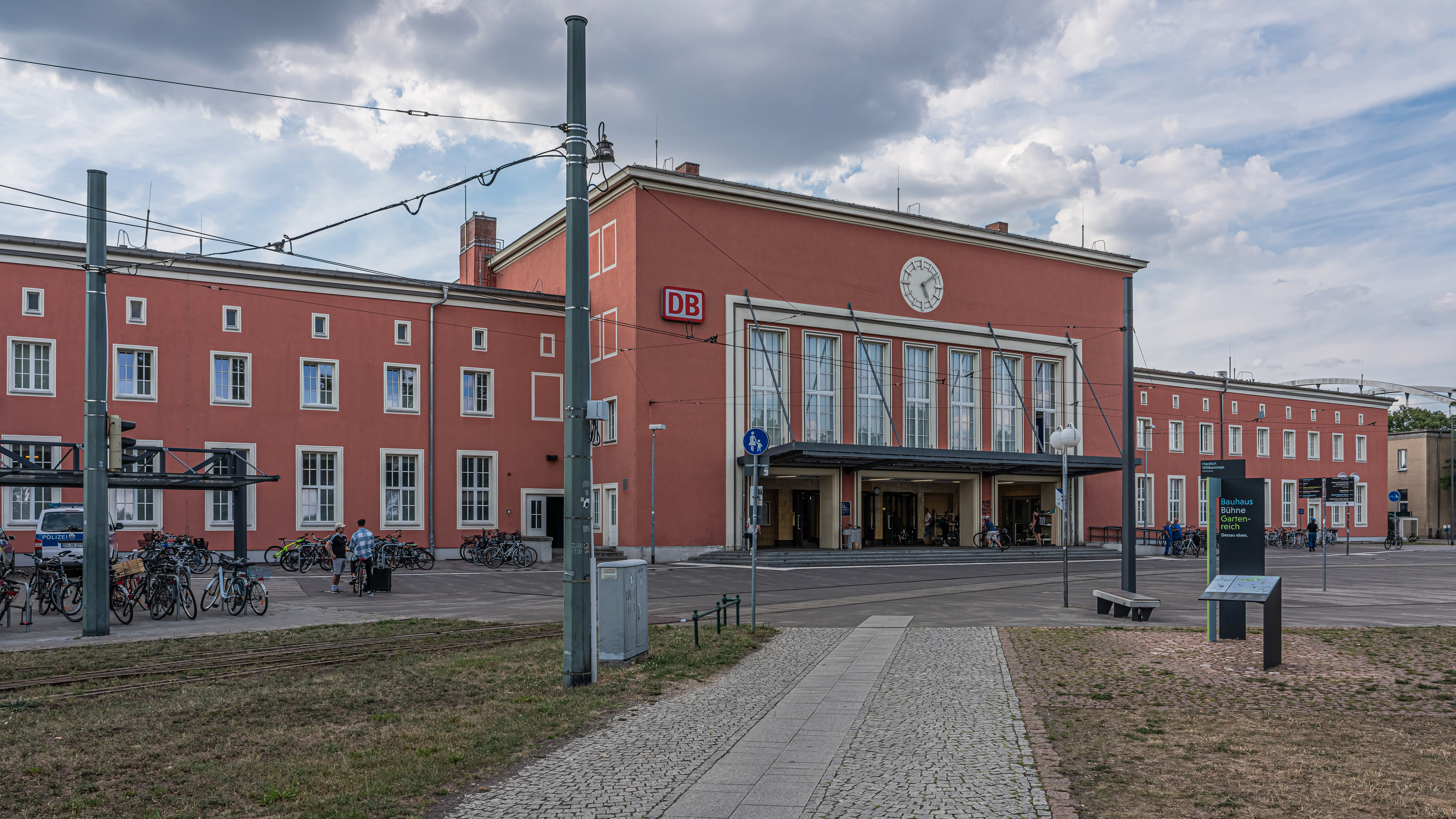
- Entrance hall of station (2022)

General information
- Location: Fritz-Hesse-Str. 47, Dessau-Roßlau, Saxony-Anhalt; Germany
- Coordinates: 51°50′24″N 12°14′6″E
- Owner: Deutsche Bahn
- Operator: DB Station&Service
- Lines: Dessau–Leipzig; Biederitz–Dessau; Dessau–Wörlitz; Dessau–Köthen
- Platforms: 6 + 1 side platform (DWE)
- Train operators: Abellio Rail Mitteldeutschland; DB Regio Nordost; DB Regio Südost; Dessau-Wörlitzer Eisenbahn; S-Bahn Mitteldeutschland

Construction
- Accessible: Yes
- Architectural style: Bauhaus

Other information
- Station code: 1173
- DS100 code: LD
- IBNR: 8010077
- Category: 3
- Fare zone: MDV: 270 (Note: As this zone is in the "MDV Nord" area, MDV fares only apply to rail transport.)
- Website: www.bahnhof.de

History
- Opened: 1 September 1840; 185 years ago
- Electrified: 1911-1914 (Note: Since 1915 catenaries were dismantled to recover copper for war production.); 1922-1946 (Note: From 1946 catenaries and overhead line masts were dismantled as Soviet war reparations.); 9 June 1958; 68 years ago

Services
Preceding station	Abellio Rail Mitteldeutschland	Following station
Dessau-Alten towards Aschersleben	RB 50	Terminus
Preceding station	DB Regio Nordost	Following station
Terminus	RE 7	Roßlau (Elbe) towards Senftenberg
Preceding station	DB Regio Südost	Following station
Roßlau (Elbe) towards Magdeburg Hbf	RE 13	Wolfen towards Leipzig Hbf
Terminus	RE 14	Roßlau (Elbe) towards Falkenberg (Elster)
Terminus	RB 51	Roßlau (Elbe) towards Lutherstadt Wittenberg
Preceding station	Dessau-Wörlitzer Eisenbahn	Following station
Terminus	Dessau–Wörlitz	Dessau-Waldersee towards Wörlitz
Preceding station	Mitteldeutschland S-Bahn	Following station
Terminus	S 2	Dessau Süd towards Leipzig-Stötteritz
Dessau Süd towards Halle (Saale) Hbf	S 8	Terminus
Location

Dessau Hauptbahnhof is the main passenger station in the city of Dessau-Roßlau in the German state of Saxony-Anhalt.

== Location ==
The station is located to the south of the Elbe and to the west of central Dessau. It is a through station, orientated from the north-east to the south-west. Located on its south-eastern frontage is a stop for trams and buses operated by the Dessauer Verkehrsgesellschaft, the city's public transport company.

== History ==
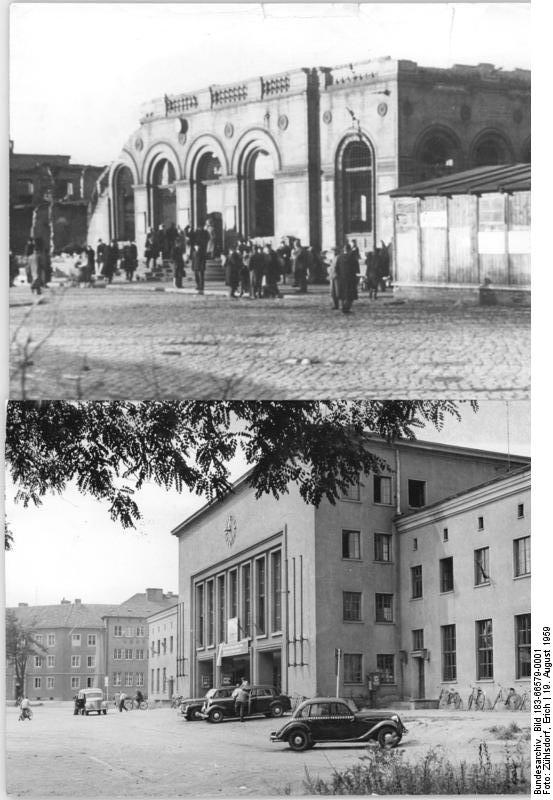
1945 (above), 1959 (below)

Dessau had an important role in rail transport from the early days of railways in Germany because of the crossing over the Elbe to its north. The first railway was opened on 1 September 1840 by the Berlin-Anhalt Railway Company. As early as 1911 the line to Bitterfeld was electrified experimentally. Because of the location of several industrial enterprises in the region, such as the Junkers aircraft factory, the railway was very important for rail freight.

In World War II, the station building was destroyed in an air raid on 7 March 1945 and was rebuilt up to 1952.

While the station was formerly a stop for InterRegio and Intercity trains, it is now almost exclusively served by regional transport as Dessau is not located on the busy Berlin–Halle and Magdeburg–Halle–Leipzig lines.

Between 2008 and 2011 a comprehensive renovation was carried out in the Roßlau/Dessau railway transport hub, including a major renovation of the track and overhead line equipment. The track plan of the station has been simplified, so that a speed of 160 km/h is now possible. On 5 December 2010, an electronic interlocking was brought into operation in Dessau.

On 13 December 2015, Dessau became a station on the network of the S-Bahn Mitteldeutschland, which connects it with Leipzig.

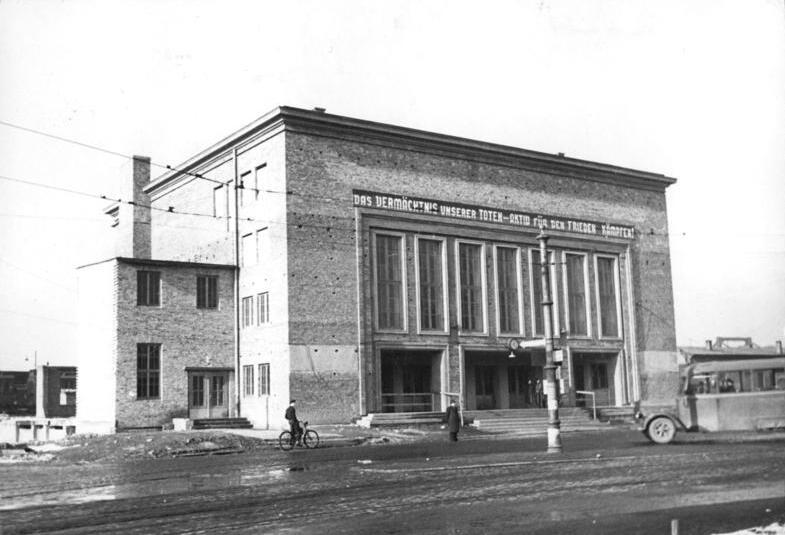
1951

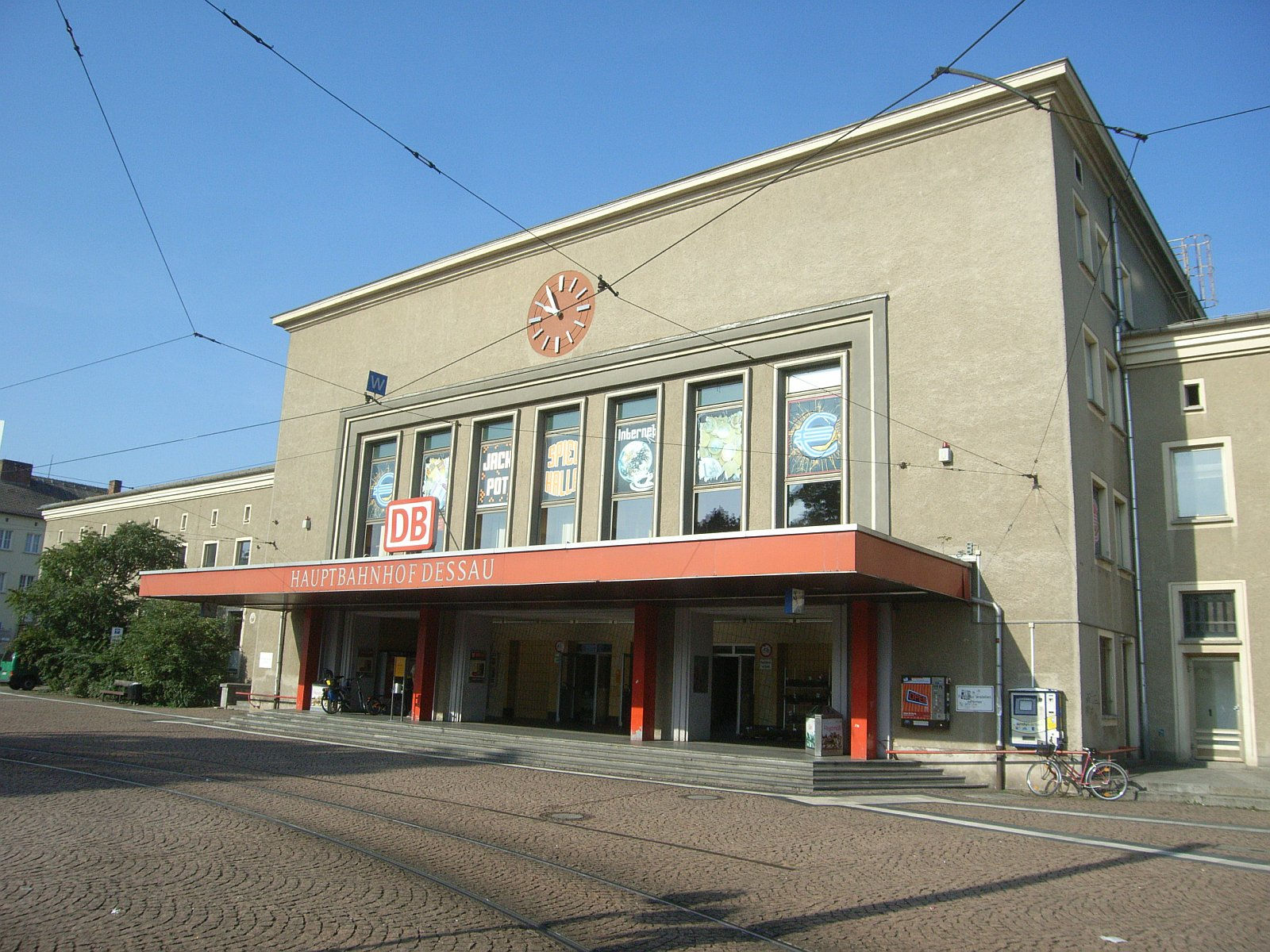
2009

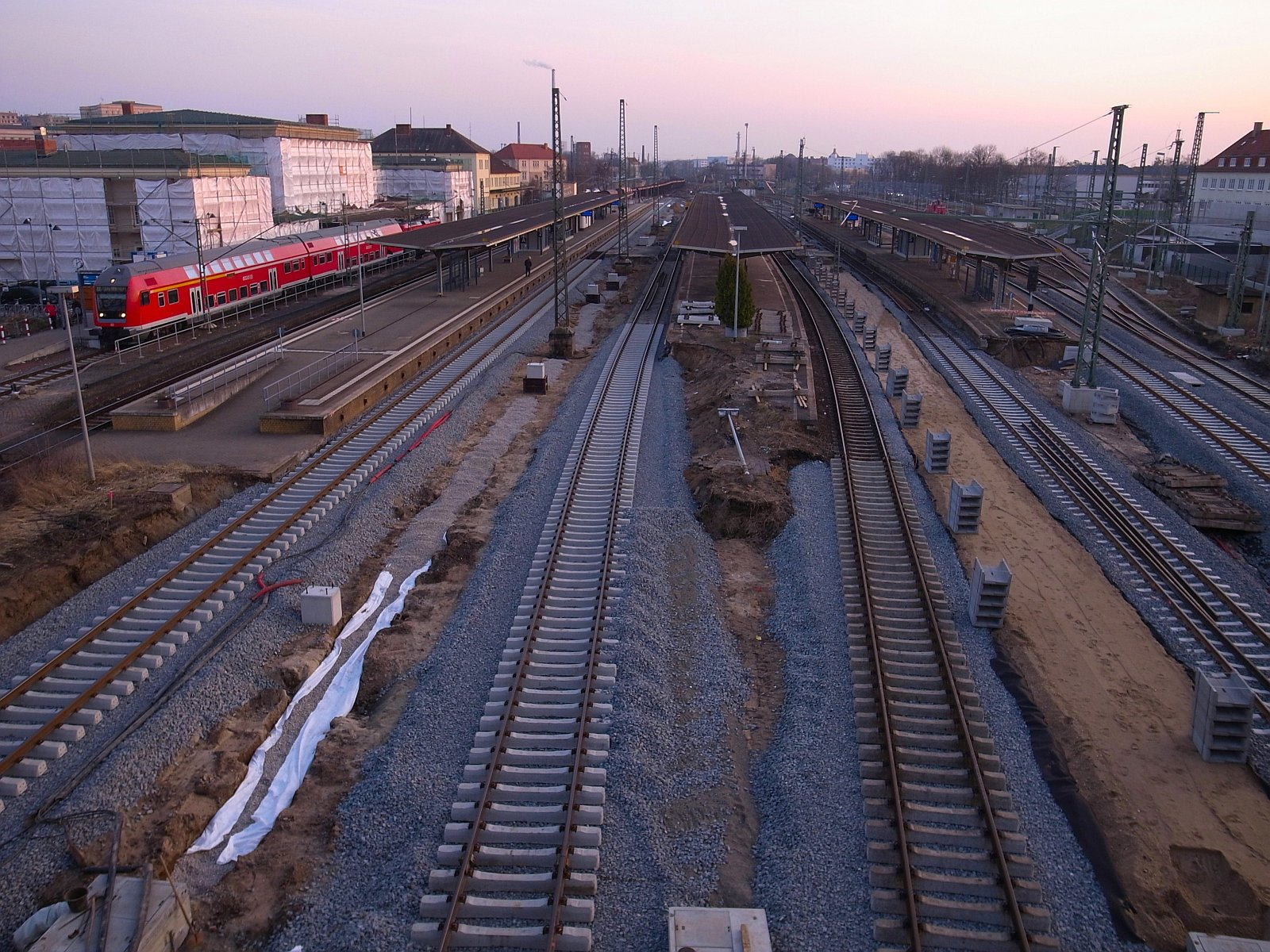
2010, rebuild of the station

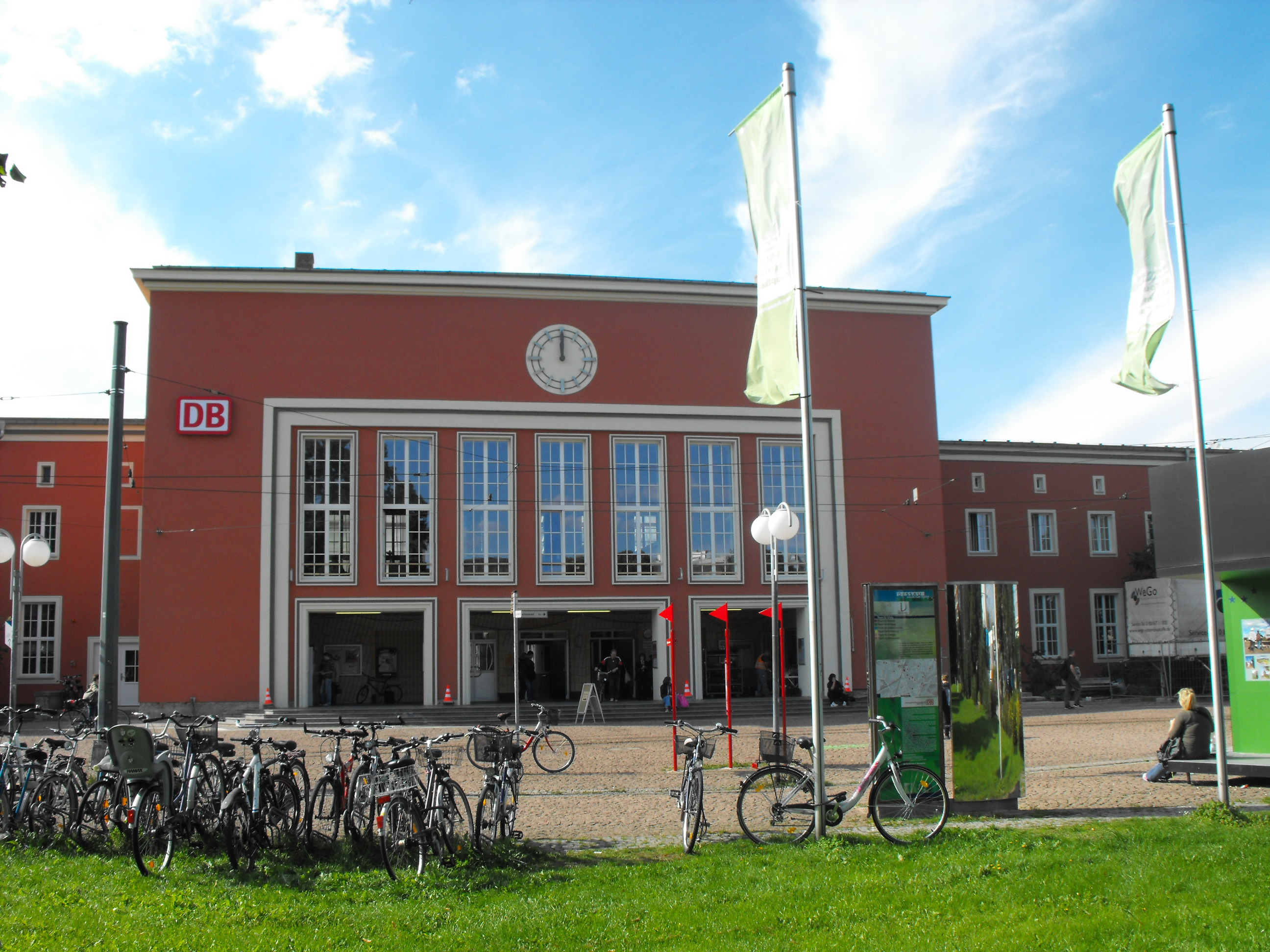
2010, after rebuild

== Connections ==
The station is used only by regional traffic. There have been no regular long-distance services since the opening of Berlin Hauptbahnhof in 2006. The Dessau-Wörlitz Railway is now a tourist railway and only operates during the summer season. The following services served the station in 2019, including IC services temporarily diverted from the Magdeburg–Halle line.

Line	Route	Interval	Operator
IC 55	Dresden – Leipzig – Bitterfeld – Dessau – Magdeburg – Braunschweig – Hannover – Bielefeld – Dortmund	Some trains	DB Fernverkehr
IC 56	Leipzig – Halle – Bitterfeld – Dessau – Magdeburg – Braunschweig – Hannover – Bremen – Oldenburg – Emden	Some trains	DB Fernverkehr
RE 3	Berlin – Ludwigsfelde – Lutherstadt Wittenberg – Dessau – Bitterfeld – Halle (Saale)	Some trains	DB Regio Nordost
RE 7	Dessau – Bad Belzig – Michendorf – Berlin – Rangsdorf – Wünsdorf-Waldstadt – Lübbenau – Senftenberg	60 (Mon–Fri); 120 (Sat–Sun)	DB Regio Nordost
RE 13	Magdeburg – Zerbst – Dessau – Bitterfeld – Delitzsch – Leipzig	60	DB Regio Südost
RE 14	Magdeburg – Zerbst – Dessau – Lutherstadt Wittenberg – Falkenberg (Elster)	Some trains	DB Regio Südost
RB 50	Dessau – Köthen – Bernburg – Güsten – Aschersleben	60 (Dessau–Güsten); 120 (Güsten–Aschersleben)	Abellio
RB 51	Dessau – Roßlau – Coswig – Lutherstadt Wittenberg	60	DB Regio Südost
S 2	Dessau – Bitterfeld – Delitzsch – Leipzig – Leipzig-Connewitz – Leipzig-Stötteritz	120	DB Regio Südost
S 8	Dessau – Wolfen – Bitterfeld – Landsberg – Halle	120	DB Regio Südost
DVE	Dessau – Oranienbaum – Wörlitz	90 (operates March–October)	DVE

In public transport the station is served by two tram and six bus routes. In addition all night bus routes start here.
