= Roßlau (Elbe) station =

Railway station in Dessau-Roßlau, Germany

Roßlau (Elbe)
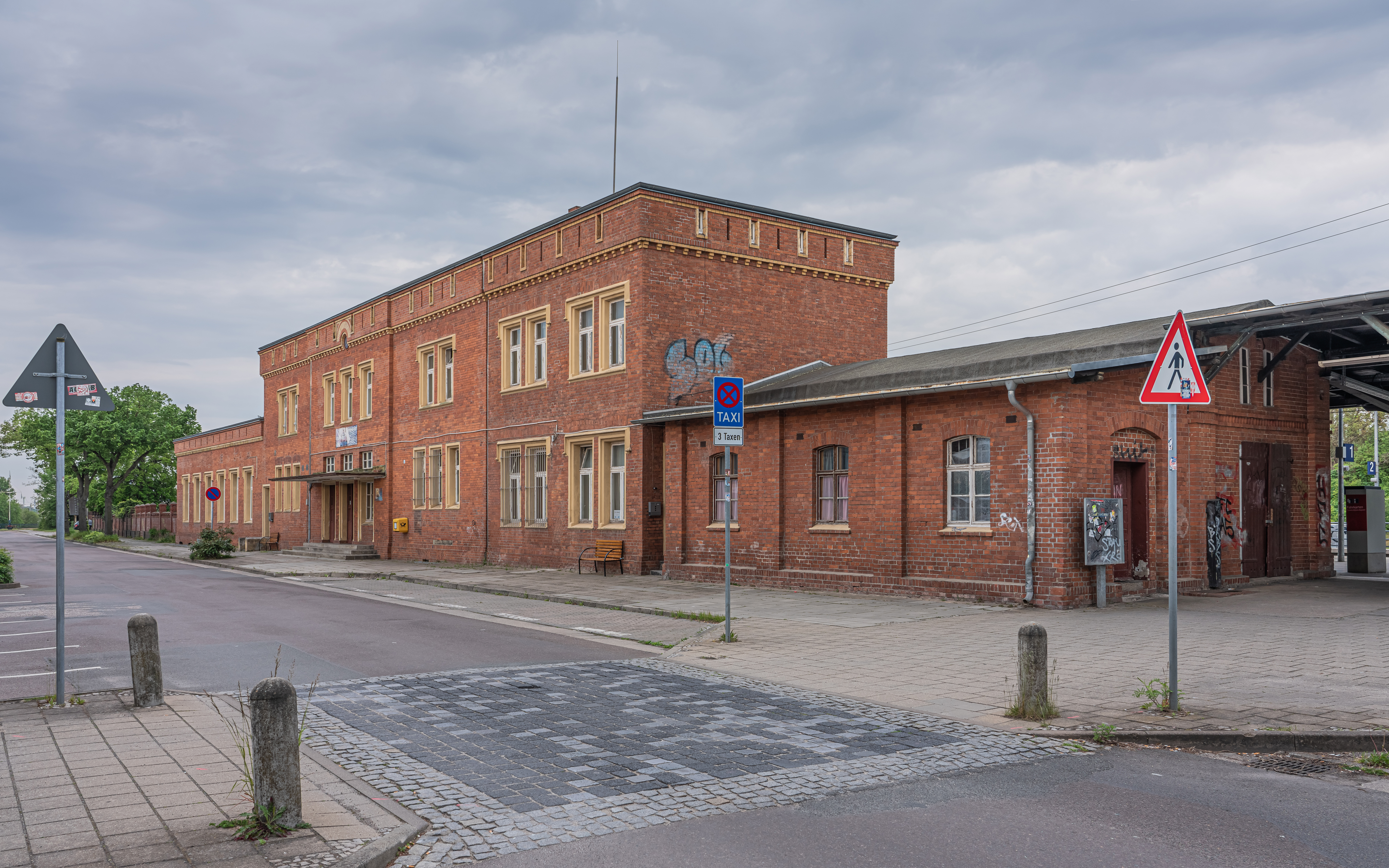
- Entrance building from the street

General information
- Location: Dessau-Roßlau, Saxony-Anhalt; Germany
- Coordinates: 51°53′03″N 12°14′14″E
- Owner: DB Netz
- Operator: DB Station&Service
- Lines: Trebnitz–Leipzig (17.9 km); Węgliniec–Roßlau (Elbe) (233.7 km); Wiesenburg–Roßlau (28.7 km)
- Platforms: 3

Construction
- Accessible: Yes

Other information
- Station code: 5358
- DS100 code: LR, LRG (freight yard)
- Category: 4
- Fare zone: MDV: 270 (rail only)
- Website: www.bahnhof.de

History
- Opened: 17 August 1841; 185 years ago
- Electrified: 1923-1946; 17 March 1958; 68 years ago

Passengers
- < 2,500

Services
| Preceding station | DB Regio Nordost | Following station |
|---|---|---|
| Dessau Hbf Terminus | RE 7 | Jeber-Bergfrieden towards Senftenberg |
| Preceding station | DB Regio Südost | Following station |
| Rodleben towards Magdeburg Hbf | RE 13 | Dessau Hbf towards Leipzig Hbf |
| Rodleben towards Magdeburg Hbf | RE 14 | Dessau Hbf towards Falkenberg (Elster) |
| Dessau Hbf towards Magdeburg Hbf | RE 14 | Coswig (Anhalt) towards Falkenberg (Elster) |
| Dessau Hbf Terminus | RB 51 | Meinsdorf towards Falkenberg (Elster) |
Location
- Location within Saxony-Anhalt Location within Germany Location within Europe

Roßlau (Elbe) station is a passenger station and freight yard in the district of Roßlau of the city of Dessau in the German state of Saxony-Anhalt.

== Infrastructure ==
The station building is located on the east side of the tracks. Platform 1 is the main platform next to the reception building and platforms 2 and 3 form an island platform. Both platforms are covered and connected by a tunnel.

The station is a railway junction. North of the passenger station the Roßlau-Falkenberg/Elster line branches off to the north east at a triangular junction from the Trebnitz–Leipzig railway. On it is the formerly significant Roßlau freight yard. It is connected by means of connecting curves to the other line, but it is now largely abandoned. The Wiesenburg–Roßlau railway also ends here.

A siding runs to the west from the passenger station to the Roßlau shipyard (Roßlauer Schiffswerft).

Immediately south of Roßlau station is the railway bridge over the Elbe.

== History ==
In 1841, the Berlin-Anhalt Railway Company (Berlin-Anhaltische Eisenbahn-Gesellschaft) had built its first station building in Roßlau for the construction of its main line from Berlin via Wittenberg and Dessau to Köthen. The Dessau–Coswig section was inaugurated on 17 August 1841. Services were running regularly to the Anhalt station by 10 September 1841. The cost of the first small building was stated to be 2,169 thalers. In the following year an extension was added for a post-Expeditions-Lokale ("post journey bar").

The present main building of the station was built in 1866 and its predecessor to its north was demolished in the following year. Additional tracks were laid in the 1870s in response to the extension of the Anhalt Leopold's railway from Zerbst to Magdeburg and the construction of the Wittenberg Falkenberg railway. The thus greatly increasing freight traffic—in particular for the transport of coal from Upper Silesia—required the establishment of a direct connection between the Wittenberg line and the Zerbst line; an area called the Eisenbahninsel ("railway island") was created by the triangle of lines thus created. The current freight yard was also established at this time and opened on 15 October 1877.

To enable the operation of through passenger service between Magdeburg/Zerbst and Coswig/Wittenberg, a second station was built in the western tip of the "railway Island"—Roßlau Neue (new) station—and opened on 15 May 1876. For through passengers this provided a little improvement, but for all other passengers it meant a significant deterioration since the trains on the Zerbst—Dessau route now stopped alternately at the old station or the new station. As a result, the "New station" was closed on 15 October 1883.

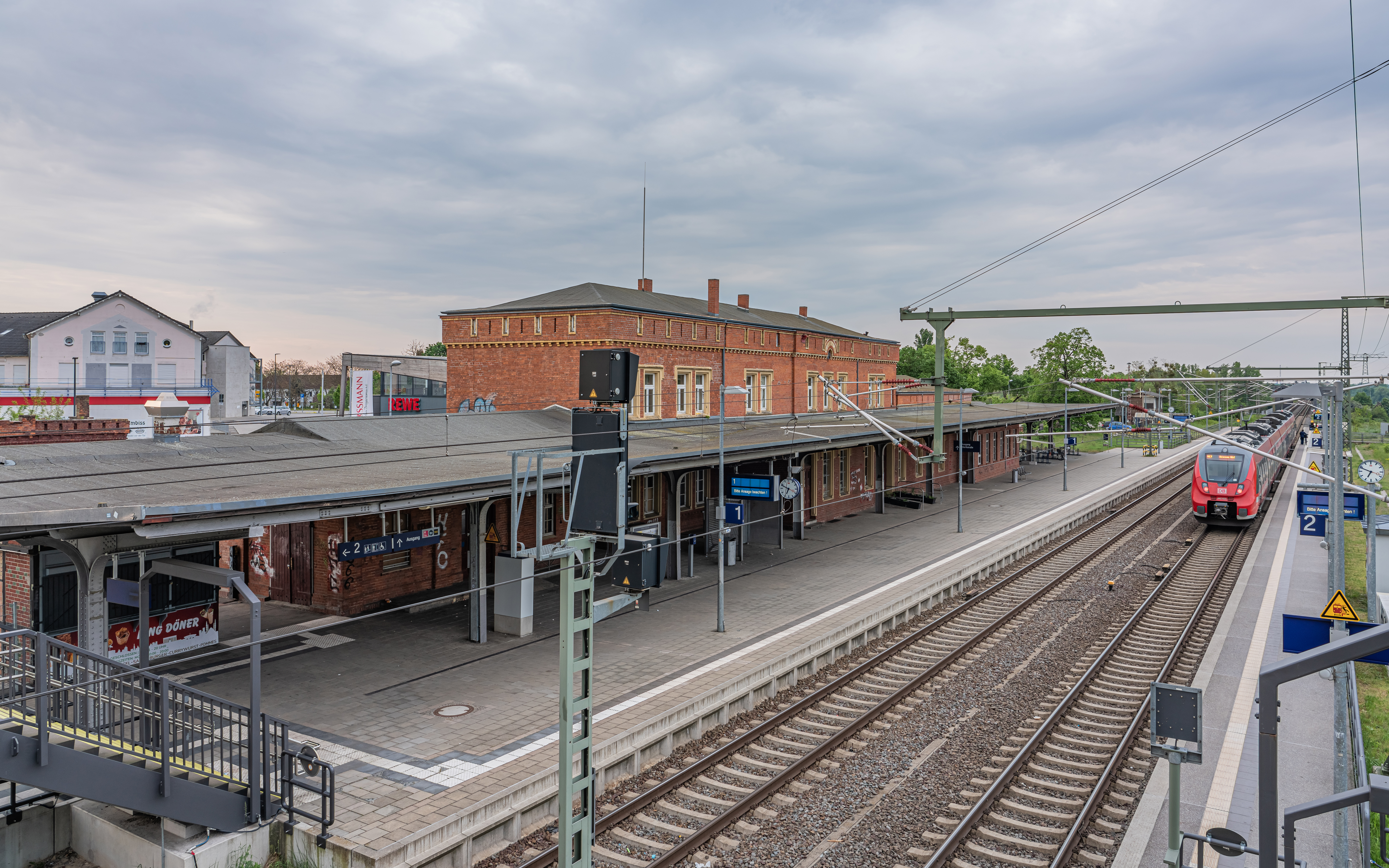
Station building, track side

One last major renovation of the passenger station was carried out between 1904 and September 1906: the island platform was built and connected by a pedestrian tunnel and canopies were built over both platforms. This work cost 228,000 gold marks. Even the freight yard continued to grow gradually, as it received a large increase in traffic in 1931 as a result of the transfer of marshalling traffic from Dessau marshalling yard.

In 1923, electric operations commenced on the Dessau–Roßlau–Zerbst line. The catenary was dismantled in 1945 as war reparations to the Soviet Union. In 1958, Roßlau station was reconnected to Deutsche Reichsbahn’s electrified network with the electrification of the track from Roßlau freight yard to Bitterfeld. The line to Zerbst and Magdeburg was electrified in 1974 and to Lutherstadt Wittenberg in 1985. Electrical services were introduced on the line via Wiesenburg in 1992.

The station building including 1,200 m² of land was sold in April 2013.

From 2018 to 2022, a comprehensive renovation was carried out, including the thorough refurbishment of the track and overhead line equipment of the Roßlau/Dessau railway hub. The tracks of the station were being simplified and an electronic interlocking was built. Two new side platforms were built at the station. The northern pedestrian tunnel was partially demolished and a pedestrian overpass with lifts has replaced it since 2021.

== Transport services ==
The Roßlau (Elbe) station is linked to the northeast to the federal capital of Berlin, to the northwest to the state capital of Magdeburg, to the east to Lutherstadt Wittenberg and to the south via Dessau to Halle and Leipzig. It is served exclusively by Regional-Express and Regionalbahn trains.

On the street side of the station there is a bus station, taxi parking spaces and commuter and short term parking.

| Line | Route | Frequency | Operator |
|---|---|---|---|
| RE 7 | Dessau – Roßlau – Bad Belzig – Michendorf – Potsdam Medienstadt Babelsberg – Berlin – BER Airport - Terminal 1-2 – Wünsdorf-Waldstadt – Lübbenau – Senftenberg | 60 (Mon–Fri); 120 (Sat–Sun) | DB Regio Nordost |
| RE 13 | Magdeburg – Roßlau – Dessau – Leipzig | 120 | DB Regio Südost |
| RE 14 | Falkenberg (Elster) – Lutherstadt Wittenberg – Roßlau – Dessau | - | DB Regio Südost |
| RB 51 | Dessau – Roßlau – Lutherstadt Wittenberg – Falkenberg (Elster) | 60 | DB Regio Südost |
