= Trebnitz–Leipzig railway =

Railway in Saxony and Saxony-Anhalt, Germany

Trebnitz–Leipzig Hbf railway
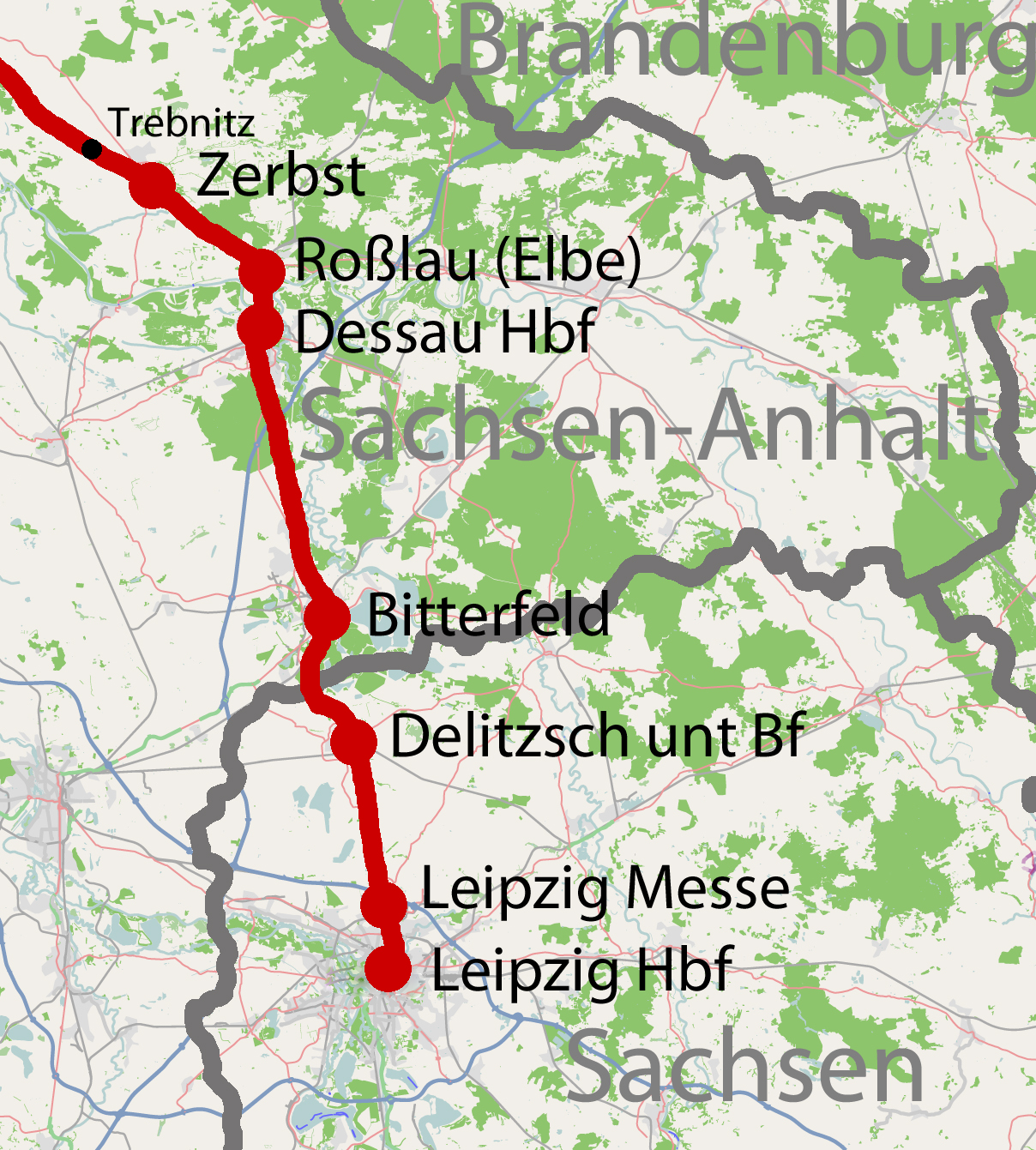

Overview
- Line number: 6411
- Locale: Saxony and Saxony-Anhalt, Germany

Service
- Route number: 251 (Dessau–Leipzig); 254 (Trebnitz–Dessau)

Technical
- Line length: 81.268 km (50.498 mi)
- Track gauge: 1,435 mm (4 ft 8 1/2 in) standard gauge
- Electrification: 15 kV/16.7 Hz AC overhead catenary

The Trebnitz–Leipzig railway is a double track electrified main line in the German states of Saxony-Anhalt and Saxony built and originally operated by the Berlin-Anhalt Railway Company. It formally starts at Trebnitz on the former border between the Duchy of Anhalt and Prussia and runs via Dessau and Delitzsch to Leipzig. The section from Bitterfeld to Leipzig is part of Line 1 of the Trans-European Transport Networks (TEN-T). Until 1871, the Zerbst–Roßlau section was called the Anhaltische Leopoldsbahn (Anhalt Leopold's railway).

== History ==
=== Planning and Construction ===
The Berlin-Anhalt Railway Company (German: Berlin-Anhaltische Eisenbahn-Gesellschaft) was for more than four decades in the 19th century one of the major railway companies in Germany. It built during this period a network of major rail links between Berlin and the northern part of the Kingdom of Saxony and the Prussian Province of Saxony and the Duchy of Anhalt, including the Anhalt trunk line.

Its trunk line ran from Berlin via Wittenberg and Dessau to Köthen, where it connected with the Magdeburg-Leipzig line to Halle and Leipzig. In order to shorten the route to Halle and Leipzig, the company built direct lines from Dessau via Bitterfeld to Leipzig and Halle in the late 1850s. The section from Dessau to Bitterfeld was opened on 17 August 1857. This was followed by the opening of the sections from Bitterfeld to both Halle and Leipzig on 1 February 1859. A shorter line was opened between Berlin to Leipzig on a direct route between Wittenberg and Bitterfeld on 3 August 1859.

The parliament of the Duchy of Anhalt decided to build a 13 km long railway from Roßlau to Zerbst to connect Zerbst to the fast-growing rail network. This was opened on 1 November 1863. The line was operated by the Berlin-Anhalt Railway Company. It acquired the railway on 1 October 1871 for one million marks and extended it from 1 July 1874 to the Anhalt–Prussian border at Trebnitz. At the same time the Berlin-Potsdam-Magdeburg Railway Company (Potsdam-Magdeburger Eisenbahngesellschaft) opened it line from the border to Biederitz, which was already connected by the Berlin–Potsdam–Magdeburg Railway to Magdeburg.

A passenger train and a locomotive collided at a Rackwitz on 21 June 1871. 19 people died and 56 others were injured.

=== Electrification ===
The Magdeburg–Dessau–Leipzig–Halle axis was one of the first mainline to be electrified with low-frequency, single phase power. The Prussian state railways preferred to electrify the Euskirchen–Trier and the Altona-Kiel lines, but the army command had objections in both cases. In addition, lignite deposits in the area meant that a power station with short supply routes could be constructed at Muldenstein. Construction on the Muldenstein railway power station started on 18 January 1910 and about two months later the construction of a substation in Bitterfeld and the erection of overhead contact wire for the first section from Dessau to Bitterfeld began.

The state police approved the power supply and contact line systems on 4 January 1911 and trial operations with a voltage of 5 kV and a supply line voltage of 30 kV began on 18 January 1911 using a borrowed Baden State Railways class A1 locomotive, which had previously had test runs on the Ammergau Railway with transformers suitable for 5.5 kV. After increasing the supply line voltage to the designated 60 kV, the catenary voltage was increased to 10 kV for test runs on 25 March and permanent on 28 March the newly built WSL 10502 HALLE and WGL 10204 HALLE locomotives could be reach their full traction effort. On 1 April, the line was opened for public operations by the Prussian Minister Paul von Breitenbach in the presence of members of parliament. After the “Convention relating to the implementation of electric traction" was established by the state railway administrations of Prussia-Hesse, Bavaria and Baden in 1912, it was agreed in the autumn of 1913 that a voltage of 15 kV and frequency of 16 2/3 Hz would be adopted. In order to extend electrified service to the south, a sub-station was put into operation on 1 May 1914 in Wahren along with a 60 kV feeder line. By 1 June 1914, electric rail operations had been extended to Neuwiederitzsch and beyond to parts of the Leipzig freight ring, but after the outbreak of the First World War it was closed in the first few days of August 1914 so that the materials could be completely recovered. According to Tetzlaff, the whole line to Leipzig Hauptbahnhof was taken into operation by electric traction in June 1914, but this is considered unlikely.

At the beginning of the twenties, the electrification was initially restored between Leipzig and Dessau and soon extended over the whole line towards Magdeburg. To ensure the power supply, another substation was built in Marke.

=== After the Second World War ===
After the end of World War II, the most urgent war damage was eliminated and electric operations resumed, but it had to be abandoned in March 1946. The infrastructure was abruptly dismantled and delivered together with the locomotives to the USSR as war reparations. After the return of the electrification equipment in 1952 the line was electrified for a third time. The contact wire between Bitterfeld and Meinsdorf (Roßlau freight yard) was completed on 15 March 1958 and between Leipzig and Bitterfeld on 9 July 1958. For the connection to Magdeburg, the route via Köthen to Halle was more important, so that the line northwest of Roßlau was not initially electrified.

In 1962, the Bitterfeld–Delitzsch section was moved to allow the development of a new open pit mine at Holzweißig-West, extending its length by 1498 metres and Petersroda station was rebuilt. Federal highway 184 was rebuilt parallel to the line.

From 1 January 1955 to 1 January 1977, the section north of Haideburg yard belonged to Reichsbahndirektion (railway division) Halle, subsequently the border with the area of Reichsbahndirektion Magdeburg corresponded again with the boundary of the district of Magdeburg at Neeken. The second track was restored in the 1970s to the northwest of Roßlau in the district of Magdeburg. For unknown reasons the track was not restored in the area of the district of Halle, so points had to be installed at Neeken. The line was then re-electrified. The overhead wire was completed on 4 October 1974 between Roßlau and Zerbst and the remaining section between Zerbst and Magdeburg Neustadt was completed on 15 April 1975. Preparations were made for the overhead wire for the missing second track between Neeken and Roßlau freight yard, but the section remained single track. Although the missing track was relaid in 1990, two-track operations were not introduced because the points at the junctions had not been modified for two-track operations.

In long-distance traffic between Berlin and Leipzig, the section between Bitterfeld and Leipzig–together with the line from Bitterfeld to Halle–was the busiest in the GDR. They were served by express trains via Leipzig to Zwickau and Aue and to Gera and Saalfeld. Trains also ran over the network of Deutsche Reichsbahn from Berlin to Karlovy Vary and Rostock to Munich. In addition, one or two pairs of express ran daily from Leipzig to Magdeburg and continued towards Hanover. Trains ran towards the Berlin outer ring via Dessau, especially unscheduled services, seasonal trains and transit trains (which did not stop in East Germany) between West Berlin and West Germany.

From 1976, the line was included in Deutsche Reichsbahn’s new Städteexpress ("city express") network.

List of Städteexpress (Ex) services on the line (as of 31 May 1991)

- Ex 100/107 Elstertal: Gera–Leipzig–Berlin
- Ex 160/167 Sachsenring: Zwickau–Berlin
- Ex 151/156 Berliner Bär: Berlin–Leipzig–Erfurt
- Ex 162/163 Thomaner: Leipzig–Berlin
- Ex 166/161 Lipsia: Leipzig–Berlin

=== After 1990 ===
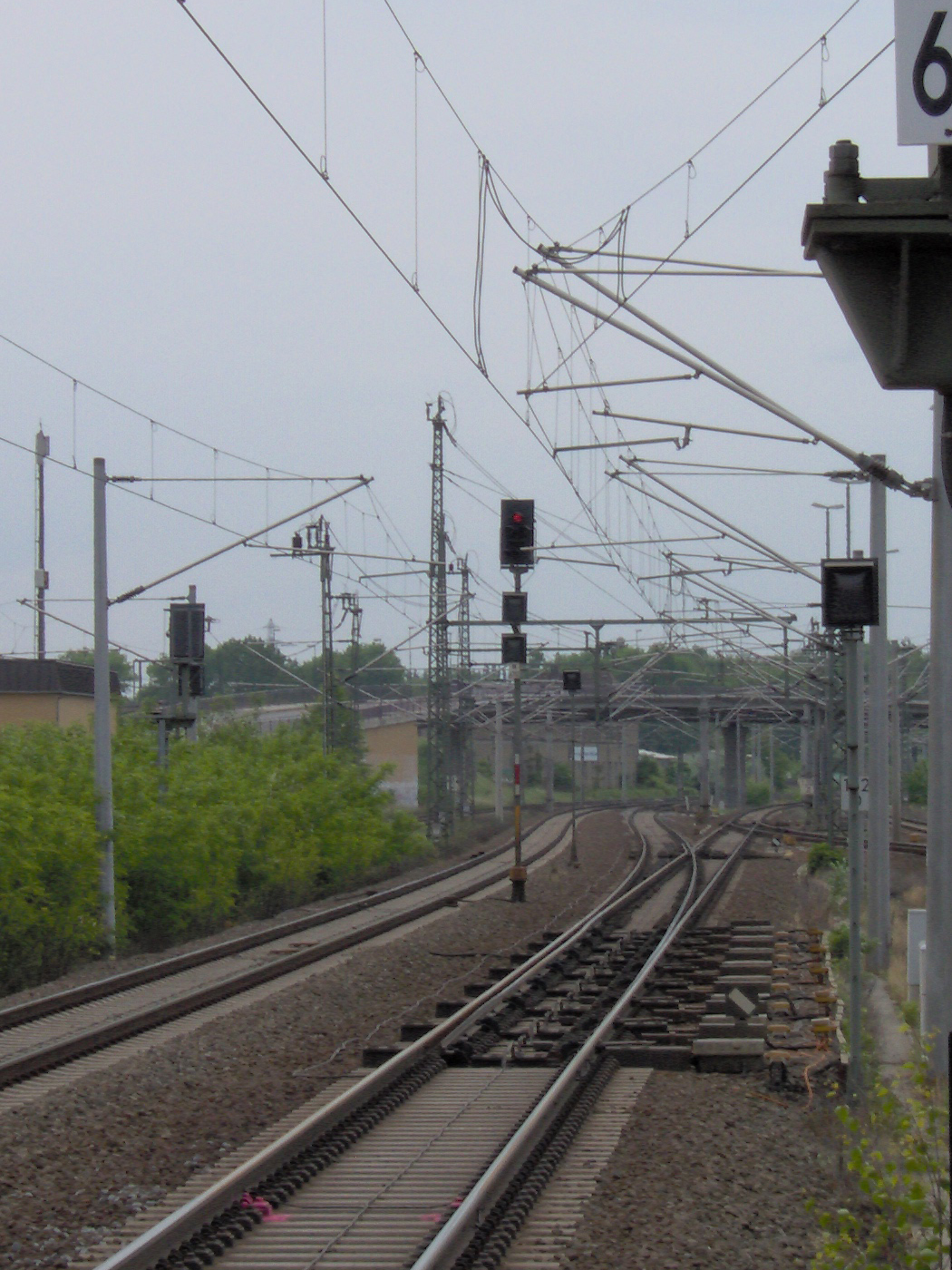
High-speed switch at the southern end of Bitterfeld station, longest in the world when installed in January 1998

Following the reunification of Germany the section from Leipzig to Bitterfeld became less important at first; the Städteexpress trains were abandoned on 31 May 1991 and replaced by Intercity and InterRegio services. Later a regular-interval timetable was introduced. The scheduled travel time between Leipzig and Berlin was around two and a half hours in 1990. As of the summer 1992 timetable, long-distance line 8 service ran every two hours from Bitterfeld to Leipzig on the Berlin–Leipzig–Nuremberg–Munich route. From 1997 to 1999, this service ran via Berlin-Wannsee and Dessau. After the service returned to running via Lutherstadt Wittenberg, Dessau initially received in its place InterRegio 36 services running between Stralsund and Frankfurt running through Bitterfeld and Halle. In addition, from 1994, there was a single daily InterRegio service running from northwest Germany via Magdeburg, Dessau and Leipzig through Saxony and eastern Thuringia with a stop in Zerbst. During the night, a train ran, depending on the timetable period, from Berlin via Dessau with destinations in Switzerland, Northern Italy or Hungary.

In 1991, upgrading of the line from Berlin to Halle and Leipzig commenced as part of the German Unity Transport Projects: rail project 8.3. In the same year, work began at the section between Bitterfeld and Delitzsch, followed in 1992 by work between Zschortau and Delitzsch. The upgrading of the entire 27.5 km section for 160 km/h was estimated to cost 340 million Deutsche Marks in early 1993. The development of the line between Leipzig and Bitterfeld was carried in a total of ten sections. At this time the line between Delitzsch and Zschortau was upgraded for a length of 2.2 km.

In the mid-1990s, the upgrade was sufficiently advanced for speeds on a section of it to be raised to a maximum of 160 km/h. Further work was required for the raising of speeds to 200 km/h, in particular the elimination of many level crossings. Completion of this work in 1999, at a cost of 3.5 billion marks, cut the travel time between Halle/Leipzig and Berlin to under an hour. Various improvements had been made to the line, including the eliminating of all crossings and the modernisation of all stations. A radio-based train protection system was installed. A timetable change in May 2006 raised speeds largely to 200 km/h on the upgraded section of the line between Bitterfeld and Leipzig.

The upgrade of the Berlin–Bitterfeld–Leipzig line allowed the operation of ICE T tilting trains on IC line 8 from December 2002. In 2005 and 2006, the line from Bitterfeld to Leipzig was upgraded for operations of up to 200 km/h. A total of €1.657 billion was invested in the upgrade of line between Halle, Leipzig and Berlin up to the end of 2013.

A curve directly connecting Leipzig/Halle Airport and the line to the north towards Berlin was contemplated but rejected in 2010.

The Elbe floods of 2002 significantly damaged an already weakened section of the bridge over the Mulde between Roßlau and Dessau. Subsequently the embankment and all the bridges were rebuilt from 2008 to 2011 just to the east of the old line and the old works were then dismantled.

Subsequently since 2009 there has been a comprehensive renovation, including a major reconstruction of the track and overhead line equipment of the Roßlau/Dessau railway node. The first section rebuilt covered the line from Dessau to Wolfen, including work to renew and adapt the stations of Dessau-Süd, Marke, Raguhn, Jeßnitz and Wolfen. On 5 December 2010, electronic interlockings were put into operation in Dessau and Raguhn, which replaced all other signal boxes on the section between Dessau and Wolfen. Between the spring of 2012 and the summer of 2013, further work was carried out on the section between Güterglück and Roßlau. Here, the second track was restored between Neeken and Roßlau, Zerbst and Rodleben stations were rebuilt and the overhead contact lines and the signalling systems were renewed. An electronic interlocking for this section of line was built in Güterglück. The remodelling of Roßlau station is planned.

Between early 2010 and mid-2013, alterations were carried out between Leipzig Messe and Leipzig Hauptbahnhof for the integration of the Leipzig City Tunnel in place of the existing route. In this context, the new Leipzig Nord (planning name: Theresienstraße) station at Berliner Bridge was brought into operation at the end of 2013 together with the City Tunnel. The route to Bitterfeld was integrated into the network of the S-Bahn Mitteldeutschland. By 2017, further development is planned within the city of Leipzig as part of German Unity Transport Project 8.3.

== Route ==
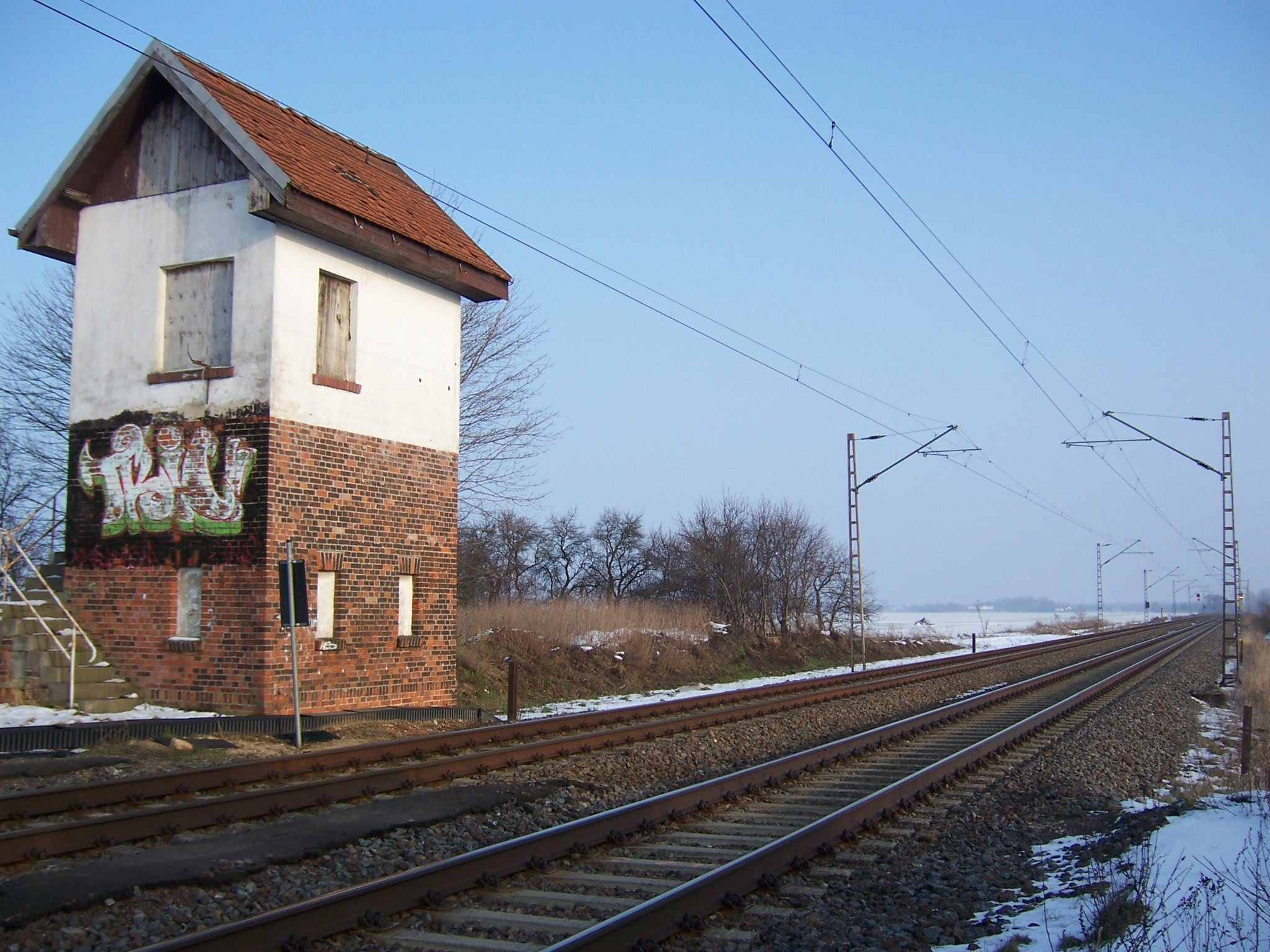
Beginning of line at Trebnitz block post

The line (6411), as defined by Deutsche Bahn, begins as the immediate continuation of the Biederitz–Trebnitz railway (6410) with the 0.0 kilometre point (at the line change) at the former Trebnitz block post, north of the village of the same name. It runs straight to Roßlau in a southeasterly direction through the fertile corridor between the Fläming Heath and the Elbe and through Zerbst, running substantially parallel to national highway 184 (B184), which it at crosses at Rodleben. On the northwestern outskirts of Roßlau there is a junction to the north with a connecting curve to Roßlau marshalling yard and the lines to Wiesenburg and Falkenberg/Elster, while this line turns south and runs to Roßlau (Elbe) station. The line passes under the B 184 before Roßlau station and the line crosses the Elbe on a truss bridge just south of the station. After about two kilometres, following a section on a long bridge, the line crosses of the Mulde and its flood plain. At Dessau Hauptbahnhof, the line again passes under the B 184, which runs north and south of the city largely parallel to the line.

At the southern exit of Dessau Hauptbahnhof, the line to Köthen branches off to the west and about three kilometres later the line reaches Dessau repair shop (Ausbesserungswerk). Between Dessau-Haideburg and Marke the line runs through a wooded area, and approximately half-way through it, national highway 9 passes under the line. The line follows the cultivated part of the Mulden valley until Raguhn, but the industrial area around Bitterfeld-Wolfen begins in Jeßnitz. In Bitterfeld the line from Stumsdorf, which is used only for freight traffic, runs from the west while the Berlin–Halle railway runs from the north through the Mulde valley. The latter line runs parallel for about two kilometres from Bitterfeld station until the vicinity of Holzweißig, where it crosses over using a flying junction and runs away to the southeast towards Halle. Near Petersroda the line passes Ludwigsee and the Neuhäuser See (lakes) at a distance and it then crosses the border with Saxony. After crossing the Lober, the line again returns to its original route and soon reaches Delitzsch with its repair shop and Delitzsch unterer (lower) station. South of Delitzsch the line run almost straight to the outskirts of Leipzig and passes under federal highway 184 and autobahn 14. Near the Leipzig Trade Fair (Messe), the Erfurt–Leipzig/Halle high-speed railway approaches from the west. After Leipzig Messe station, the old line from Halle approaches from the same direction, together with the freight ring. The latter turns to the east at Eutritzsch towards Engelsdorf, while the line from Eilenburg comes from the same direction. After a slight change of direction to the southwest, the line reaches Leipzig Hauptbahnhof near to the centre of its many tracks.

== Infrastructure ==
As part of the re-equipment with Punktförmige Zugbeeinflussung ("intermittent train protection”), the remaining semaphore and colour light signals were replaced. As part of the upgrading of the whole line to allow operations at 200 km/h between 1992 and 1999, it was equipped with electronic interlockings. Since then, continuous reversible operations have been possible as only Ks signals (Kombinationssignal), the most modern system of colour light signals in Germany, are used. All level crossings have been eliminated and replaced by new bridges.

To test and adapt the new European standard signalling and control system, Deutsche Bahn installed European Train Control System (ETCS) Level 2 on part of this line for the first time in Germany. The 2418/2419 pair of Intercity trains operated on trial scheduled services equipped with ETCS at up to 200 km/h from 26 May 2006. On 17 June 2006, for the first time in Europe, a scheduled service, operated under ETCS, was recorded at 200 km/h.

== Operations ==
Since 2006, there have been no long-distance trains north of Bitterfeld. In the current timetable (as of 15 December 2013) the following trains run:

Line	Route	Line section	Frequency	Remarks
ICE28	Hamburg–Berlin Hauptbahnhof–Leipzig–Nuremberg–Munich	Bitterfeld–Leipzig	60 min	Some trains continues via Halle rather than Leipzig
X	Warnemünde–Berlin–Leipzig	Bitterfeld–Leipzig	Twice daily	InterConnex
RE13	Magdeburg–Dessau–Leipzig	Trebnitz–Leipzig	120 min	
RE15	Magdeburg–Dessau–Lutherstadt Wittenberg	Trebnitz–Dessau	Max. twice daily	Extra trains at peak hours
RB42	Magdeburg–Dessau	Dessau–Leipzig	120 min	
RB54	Dessau–Bitterfeld–Leipzig	Dessau–Leipzig	120 min	
RB57	Lutherstadt Wittenberg–Bitterfeld–Leipzig	Bitterfeld–Leipzig	120 min	
RB86	Dessau–Bitterfeld–Halle	Dessau–Bitterfeld	120 min	
S2	Bitterfeld–Delitzsch–Leipzig–Gaschwitz	Bitterfeld–Leipzig	60 min	

Regional services RB54 and RB86 overlap between Dessau and Bitterfeld and RB54 and RB57 overlap between Bitterfeld and Leipzig to give an hour service in Bitterfeld.

The trains on line S2 of the S-Bahn Mitteldeutschland run hourly between Bitterfeld and Leipzig, but only between Delitzsch and Leipzig on weekends.
