= Lutherstadt Wittenberg Hauptbahnhof =

Railway station in Lutherstadt Wittenberg, Germany

Lutherstadt Wittenberg Hbf
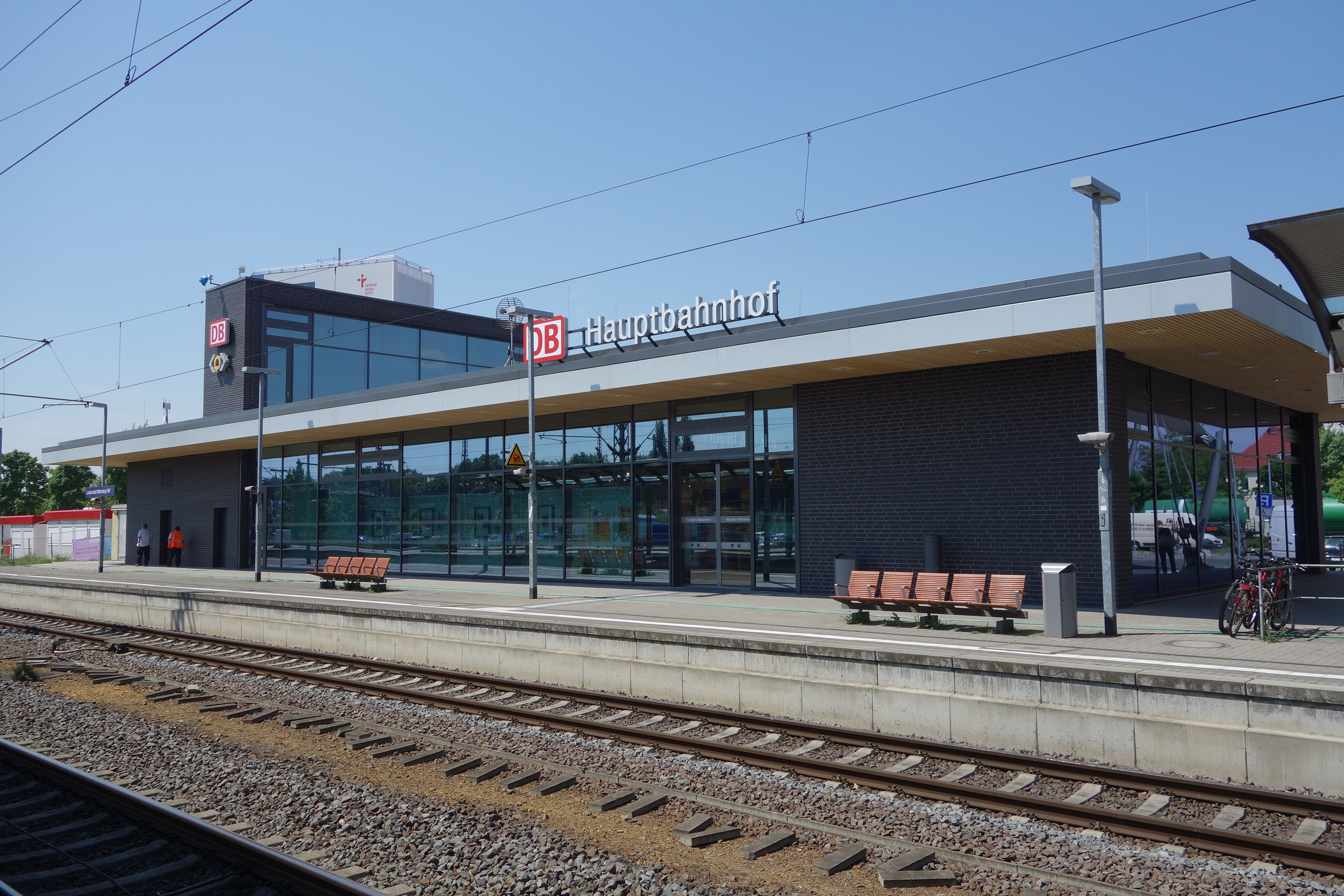
- The station in 2017

General information
- Location: Wittenberg, Saxony-Anhalt; Germany
- Coordinates: 51°52′03″N 12°39′44″E
- Owner: Deutsche Bahn
- Operator: DB Netz; DB Station&Service
- Lines: Berlin–Halle railway; Roßlau–Falkenberg/Elster railway
- Platforms: 7

Construction
- Accessible: Yes
- Architect: Franz Schwechten
- Architectural style: Neo-Renaissance

Other information
- Station code: 3863
- DS100 code: LW
- IBNR: 8010222
- Category: 3
- Fare zone: MDV: 283 (Note: As this zone is in the "MDV Nord" area, MDV fares only apply to rail transport.)
- Website: www.bahnhof.de

History
- Opened: 3 August 1859; 167 years ago
- Electrified: 25 May 1978; 48 years ago, 15 kV 16.7 Hz AC
- Former names: 1859–1945 Bf Wittenberg; 1945–2016 Bf Lutherstadt Wittenberg

Passengers
- 5000
Services
Preceding station	DB Fernverkehr	Following station
Bitterfeld towards München Hbf	ICE 11	Berlin Südkreuz towards Berlin Gesundbrunnen
Bitterfeld towards München Hbf	ICE 18	Berlin Südkreuz towards Berlin Gesundbrunnen
Leipzig Hbf towards München Hbf	ICE 28	Berlin Südkreuz towards Hamburg-Altona
Preceding station	DB Regio Nordost	Following station
Terminus	RE 3	Zörnigall towards Stralsund Hbf
Preceding station	DB Regio Südost	Following station
Lutherstadt Wittenberg Altstadt towards Magdeburg Hbf	RE 14	Lutherstadt Wittenberg-Labetz towards Falkenberg (Elster)
Lutherstadt Wittenberg Altstadt towards Dessau Hbf	RB 51	Lutherstadt Wittenberg-Labetz towards Falkenberg (Elster)
Preceding station	Mitteldeutschland S-Bahn	Following station
Terminus	S 2	Pratau towards Leipzig-Stötteritz
Pratau towards Halle (Saale) Hbf	S 8	Terminus
Location

Lutherstadt Wittenberg Hauptbahnhof (until December 2016: Bahnhof Lutherstadt Wittenberg in German) is a railway station located in Wittenberg, Germany. The station opened on 3 August 1859 is located on the Berlin–Halle railway and Roßlau–Falkenberg/Elster railway. The train services are operated by Deutsche Bahn. With over 5000 passengers per day, it is the most important railway station in the eastern part of the state of Saxony-Anhalt.

== Location and name ==
The station is located in the east of Wittenberg, about one kilometre from the historic city centre. The Berlin–Halle railway, running from the northeast to the southwest, and the Roßlau–Falkenberg/Elster railway, running east–west, cross at the station.

The station was originally called only Wittenberg and later Wittenberg (Prov Sachs), indicating that it was in the Province of Saxony. Since 1938, the city has been nicknamed Lutherstadt (Luther city) and the station has also been called Lutherstadt Wittenberg since the end of the Second World War. It is also sometimes referred to as a Hauptbahnhof (main station) unofficially and by the municipality. The street leading to the station, which was formerly called Am Bahnhof ("at the station") is now called Am Hauptbahnhof.

== History ==
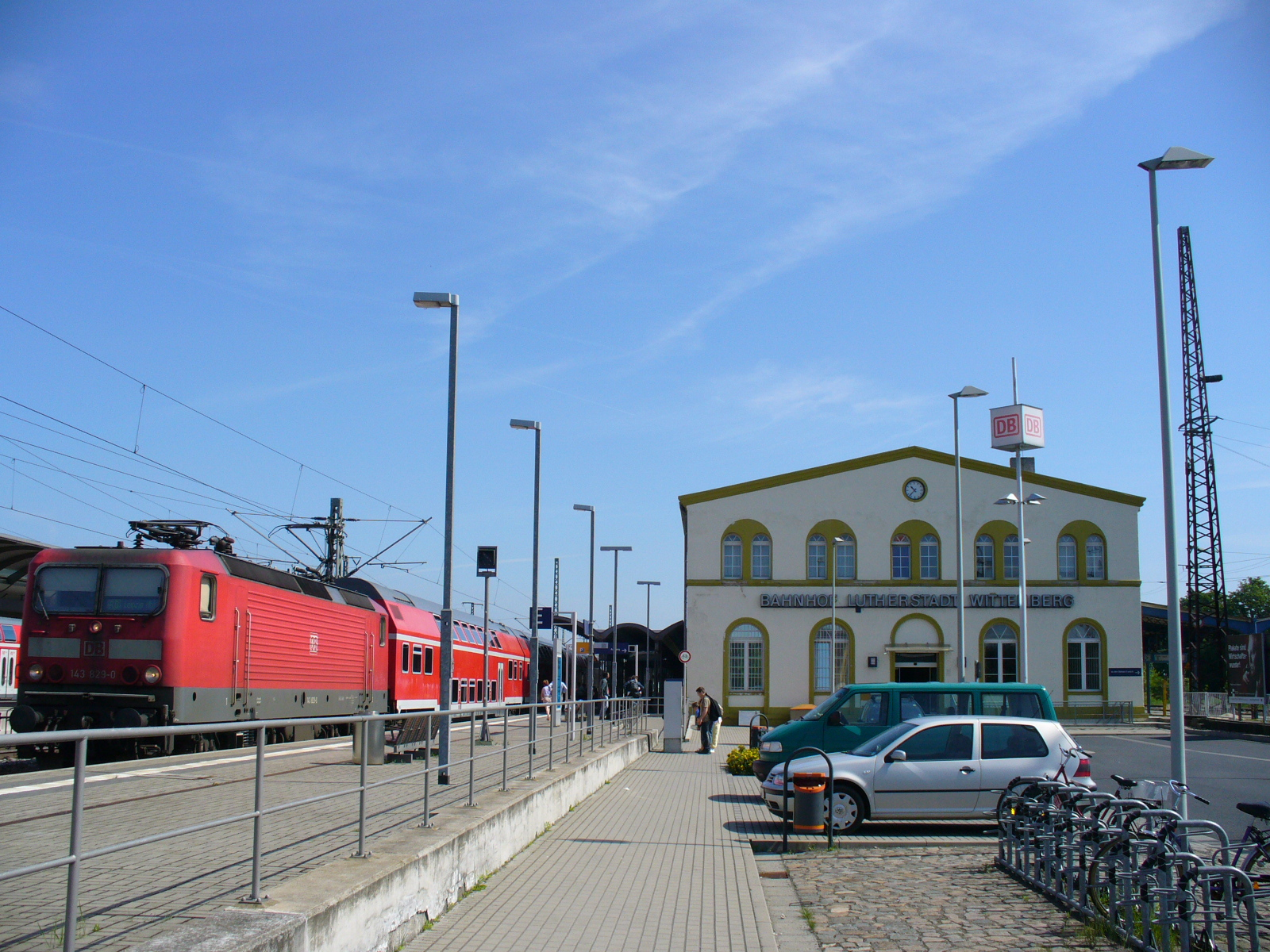
The old building

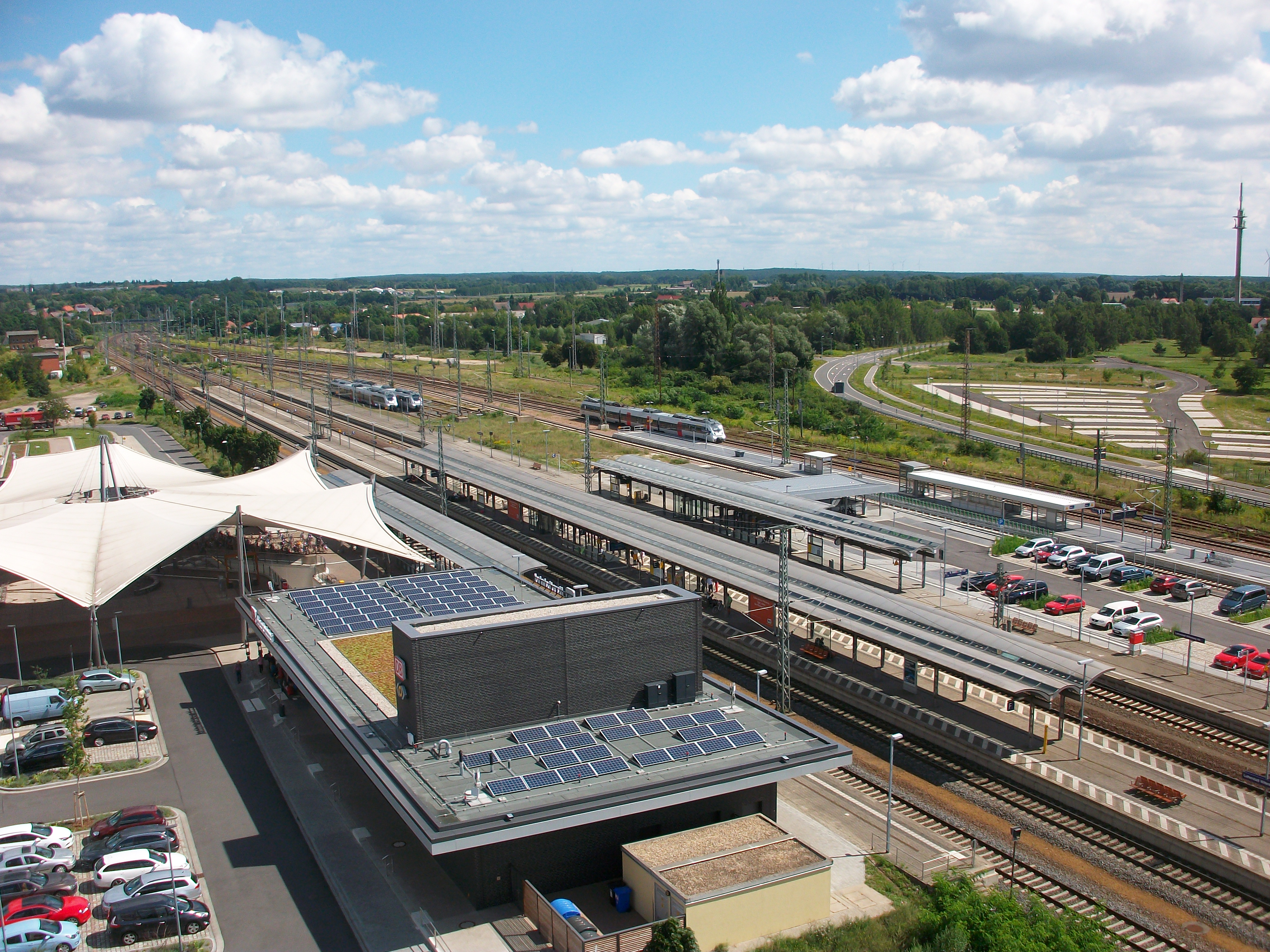
The rebuild "green station"

The Anhalt railway built by the Berlin-Anhalt Railway Company (Anhalter Bahn, BAE) from Köthen and Dessau reached Wittenberg on 28 August 1841. On 10 September 1841, the railway was consistently in operation as far as the Anhalt station in Berlin. The first Wittenberg station was also built in 1841 on the former line to the north of the city wall. It still exists today and is considered one of the oldest railway station building in Germany, but it is no longer used as such. It is located on the street of Am Alten Bahnhof (“at the old station”).

The railway facilities were reorganised in 1859 during the construction of the first railway bridge over the Elbe on a direct line from Wittenberg to Bitterfeld, which was opened on 3 August 1859. In the same year a new station building was built in the Swiss chalet style. It was located on the town side of the railway tracks at about the 95.0 km point of the current chainage of the line.

The Wittenberg–Falkenberg (Elster) railway was opened by BAE on 15 October 1875. Wittenberg had developed into a railway junction. The third station of the town was opened at its current location on 13 November 1877. The architect and builder was Franz Schwechten.

From 1888 to 1921, the station was connected to the town centre by a metre gauge horse railway.

The station was destroyed by Allied air raids on 16 and 20 April 1945. Only the outer walls from the entrance building remained standing. Reconstruction took place from 1948 and 1951.

Electric operations commenced on the Berlin–Halle railway in 1978 and on the Roßlau–Falkenberg railway in 1985.

In the spring of 1996, extensive remodelling of the station began as part of the German Unity Transport Projects (Verkehrsprojekts Deutsche Einheit): 8.3 (upgrading of the Berlin–Leipzig/Halle line). Three platforms on the Berlin–Halle railway and a 42 m-long (138 ft) pedestrian tunnel were completely rebuilt up to 1998. While previously access to the station had only been possible by a road running between the tracks of the lines to Bitterfeld and Dessau, there has since been a direct western exit to the town. The new bus station is located on the newly created station forecourt. An electronic interlocking replaced several old signal boxes. The new tracks have allowed trains to run through the station at up to 160 km/h since the construction of the new Elbe bridge.

=== Reconstruction ===
The station was rebuilt as the second "green station" in Germany, and the station building was replaced by a new building. The construction work was initially to begin in June 2012 and to be completed by the end of 2013. On 7 March 2011, the former Saxony-Anhalt Minister for Construction and Transport, Karl-Heinz Daehre, presented the idea of the first climate-friendly station in Germany. Natural materials were mainly used in the construction, and renewable energies such as sunlight provide some of the energy for the new station building. Wittenberg also transformed the area around the station and nearby parking areas. Half of the proposed project cost of €3.3 million covered the acquisition of land. The new station opened in December 2016. The new station building was built west of the tracks, and the old station building was demolished.

== Infrastructure ==
The entrance building designed by Franz Schwechten and opened in 1877 was built on an island between the tracks. The tracks are not connected south of the station and the line to Dessau passes under the line to Bitterfeld. In the north there is a common field of tracks between the lines and there are also facilities for freight.

The station building is designed like a basilica so that the entrance building benefits from daylight. Schwechten's design was in the style of the Italian Renaissance. After the destruction of the Second World War only the outer walls were intact and the design of the entire interior comes from the post-war period.

West of the station building is the line from Berlin to Halle with platform tracks 1–4, with track 4 lying next to the station building and tracks 2 and 3 lying next to an island platform. The platforms are covered and connected by a tunnel. East of the station building is the Roßlau–Falkenberg (Elster) line with platform tracks 5–7, of which only track 6 is currently (2013) used regularly by passenger trains. This platforms is not covered and can only be reached by crossing the tracks from platform 5 next to the station building.

Some two kilometres of the station to the northeast is the former Lutherstadt Wittenberg rail workshop (Bahnbetriebswerk Lutherstadt Wittenberg).

== Train services ==
Wittenberg station offers connections to the north to Berlin as well as to the south towards Halle and Leipzig. To the west there are regional rail links towards Dessau and from there to Magdeburg and to the east there are connections to Falkenberg (Elster) and from there to Cottbus and Hoyerswerda. Intercity-Express and Intercity trains also stop in Wittenberg. The historic town centre is about one kilometre away from the station.

In the 2026 timetable, the following services stop at the station:

Line	Route	Interval (min)	Operator
ICE 11	Berlin Gesundbrunnen – Berlin – Lutherstadt Wittenberg – Leipzig – Erfurt – Frankfurt – Stuttgart – Munich	120	DB Fernverkehr
ICE 18	Munich – Augsburg – Nuremberg – Jena Paradies – Leipzig – Wittenberg – Berlin – Berlin Gesundbrunnen	One train pair overnight	DB Fernverkehr
ICE 28	Hamburg-Altona – Hamburg – Berlin – Wittenberg – Leipzig – Erfurt – Bamberg – Nuremberg – Munich	120	DB Fernverkehr
RE 3	Wittenberg – Jüterbog – Berlin – Eberswalde – Greifswald – Stralsund	120	DB Regio Nordost
RE 14	Dessau – Roßlau – Coswig – Wittenberg – Annaburg – Falkenberg	Some trains in the afternoon peak	DB Regio Südost
RB 51	Dessau – Roßlau – Coswig – Wittenberg – Annaburg – Falkenberg	60 (Dessau–Wittenberg); 120 (Wittenberg–Falkenberg)	DB Regio Südost
S 2	(Jüterbog –) Wittenberg – Gräfenhainichen – Bitterfeld – Delitzsch – Leipzig – Leipzig-Stötteritz	120	DB Regio Südost
S 8	(Jüterbog –) Wittenberg – Gräfenhainichen – Bitterfeld – Landsberg – Halle	120	DB Regio Südost
