= Berlin–Halle railway =

Railway line in Germany

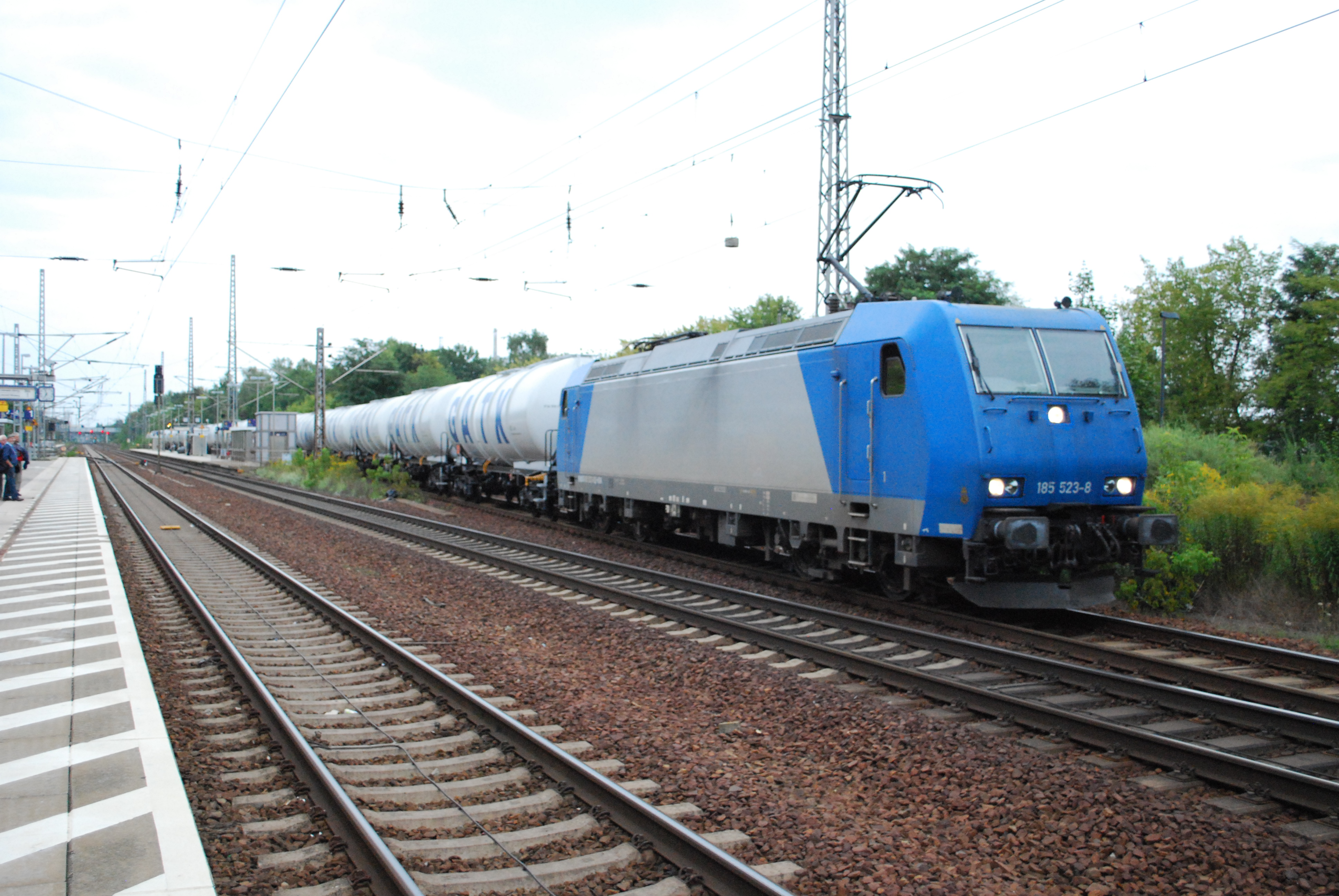
- A freight train passes Ludwigsfelde station in 2012

Overview
- Native name: Anhalter Bahn
- Line number: 6132
- Locale: Berlin, Brandenburg, Saxony-Anhalt, Germany
- Termini: Berlin Südkreuz; Halle

Service
- Route number: 250

History
- Opened: 1 July 1841; 10 September 1841; 1859

Technical
- Line length: 161.6 km (100.4 mi)
- Track gauge: 1,435 mm (4 ft 8 1/2 in) standard gauge
- Electrification: 15 kV/16.7 Hz AC overhead catenary
- Operating speed: 200 km/h (124.3 mph) (maximum)
Route map
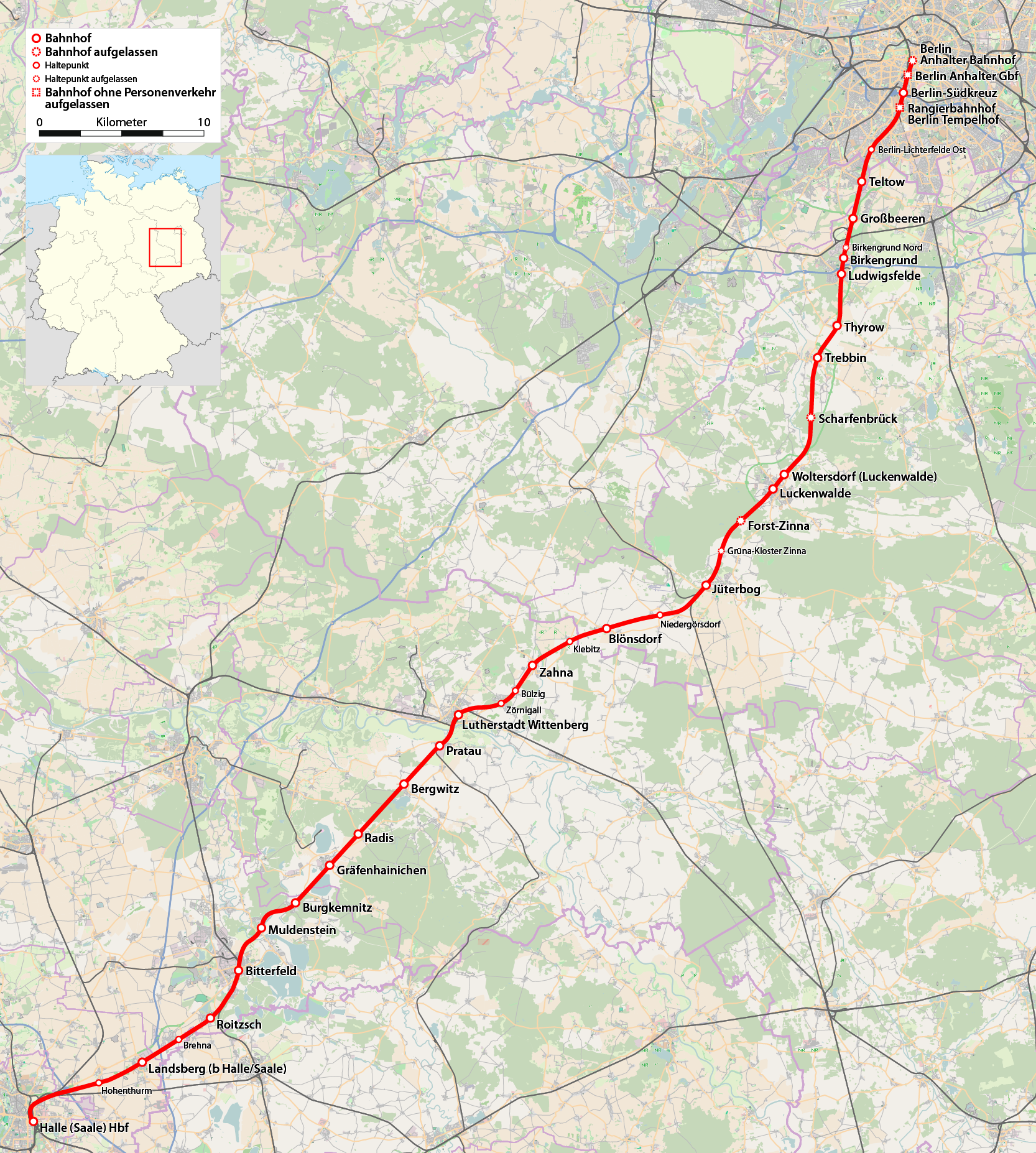
- Source: German railway atlas

The Berlin–Halle railway, sometimes called the Anhalt railway (German: Anhalter Bahn), is a twin-track, electrified main line found in the German city and state of Berlin, and the states of Brandenburg and Sachsen-Anhalt. The railway was originally built and managed by the Berlin-Anhaltische Eisenbahn-Gesellschaft.

The Anhalt railway runs from Berlin via Jüterbog and Wittenberg to Halle. The line is part of the Line 1 of Trans-European Transport Networks (TEN-T). In the Berlin area, Anhalt Suburban Line, which carries Berlin S-Bahn services, runs parallel to the main line.

== History ==
=== Early history and construction ===
The Berlin-Anhaltische Eisenbahn-Gesellschaft (Berlin-Anhalt Railway Company, BAE) was one of the most important railway companies in Germany for about four decades in the 19th century. In addition to the main Anhalt Railway, the BAE built a network of important railway connections between Berlin and the northern parts of the Kingdom of Saxony, the Prussian Province of Saxony, and the Duchy of Anhalt, with a total length of 430 kilometres (270 mi) at its apex.

The original Anhalt Railway ran from the Anhalter Bahnhof in Berlin via Jüterbog, Wittenberg, and Dessau to Köthen (including the Wittenberg–Roßlau line, the Roßlau–Dessau line and the Dessau–Köthen railway) and was put into service in 1840/1841. The section of the current line north of Jüterbog was opened on 1 July 1841 and the section between Jüterbog and Wittenberg was opened on 10 September 1841. A connection was possible in Köthen over the Magdeburg-Leipzig railway to Halle and Leipzig. In 1859, the trip between Berlin and Halle/Leipzig was considerably shortened with the opening of the direct connection between Wittenberg and Bitterfeld.

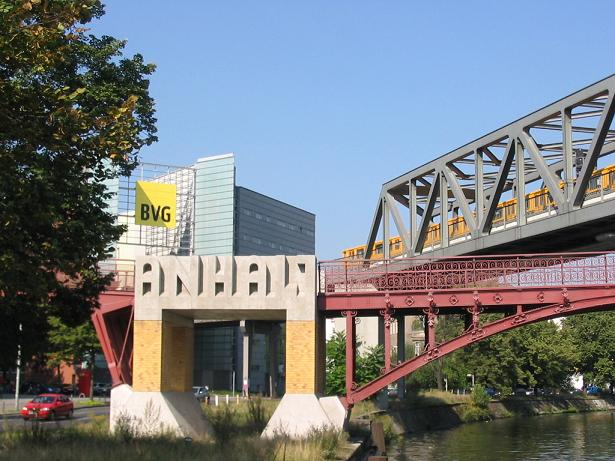
The U1 U-Bahn viaduct above the old railway bridge, near the former Anhalter Bahnhof, crossing over the Landwehrkanal

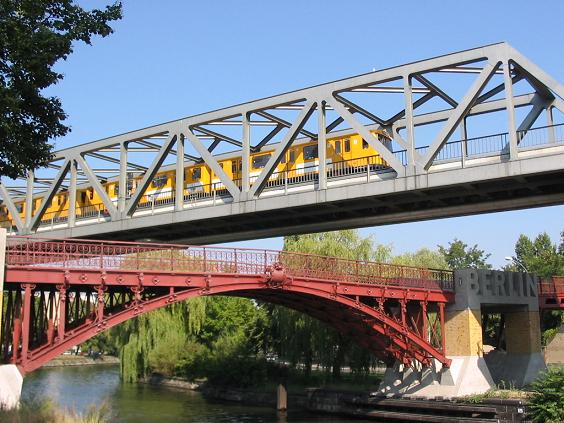
Same area as above, different perspective

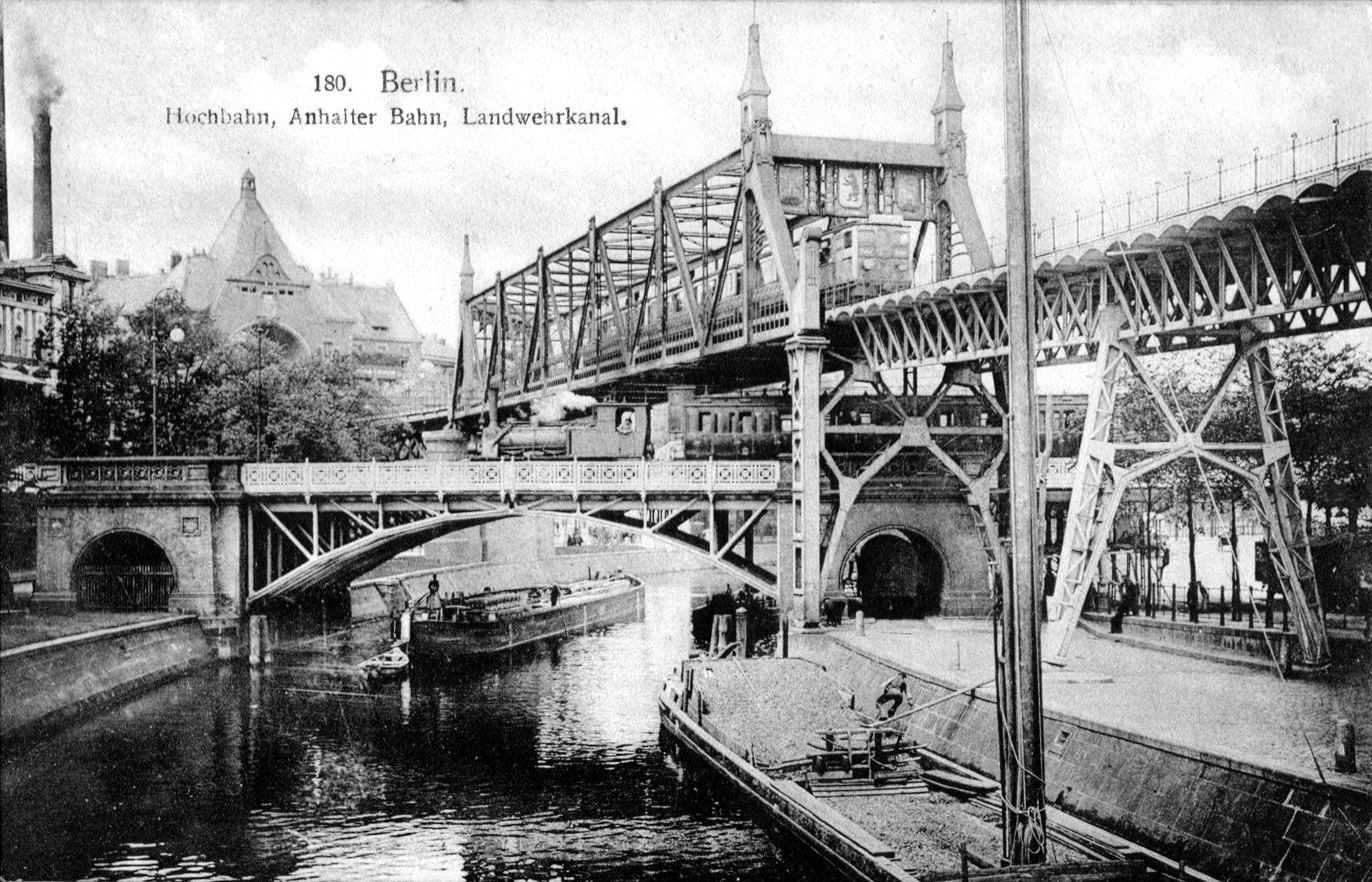
Same area around 1900

=== Prior to World War I ===
The Anhalt railway was one of the most important long-distance railways in Germany at the time of its opening. Some of the first express trains traveled from Berlin via Köthen to Halle, Leipzig, Frankfurt am Main and Munich, as well as to Dresden, Prague, and Vienna via Jüterbog-Röderau. The railway also allowed a connection between Berlin, Vienna, Rome, and Athens.

=== Part of the Deutsche Reichsbahn ===
Starting in 1923, one of the first long-distance express trains (FD-Zug) traveled from Berlin via Halle and Erfurt to Frankfurt. Starting in 1935, express multiple unit electric railcars provided the same service. In 1939, the section between Berlin and Bitterfeld, which carried long-distance services towards the Rhine-Main area and South Germany, was used by 33 pairs of long-distance trains per day, the busiest line in Germany for long-distance traffic.

=== After World War II ===
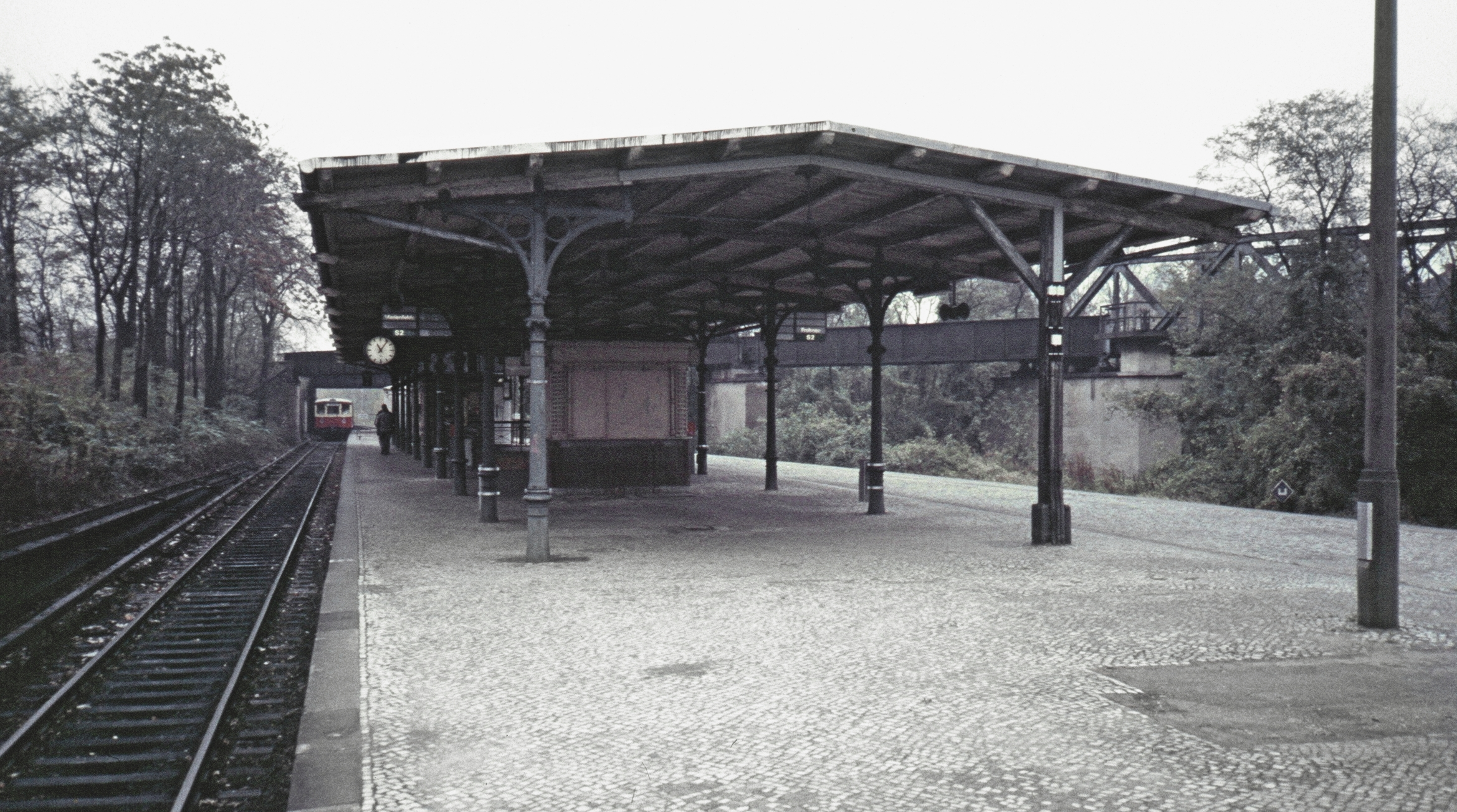
Papestraße S-Bahn station (lower platform), in the background: the Ringbahn, 1986

The property of the Anhalt railway suffered major damage during World War II, and was only repaired in critical areas. After the partition of Berlin, Deutsche Reichsbahn (East Germany) ran services to stations in East Berlin. It was not until 1951 with the completion of the first sections of the Berlin outer ring, that direct connections were possible coming from Halle or Leipzig. The connection to Berlin, and the heavily damaged Anhalter Bahnhof in Berlin-Kreuzberg, was completed on 18 May 1952. The internal East German long-distance traffic to East Berlin ran to the terminus stations of Ostbahnhof, Lichtenberg or Schöneweide. Regional service trains terminated at Teltow until the construction of the Berlin Wall, where connections to the Berlin S-Bahn using the Anhalt Suburban Line were possible.

After the construction of the Wall, the section to Teltow became a branch line. Some of the regional service trains, coming from Ludwigsfelde, were routed across the Outer Ring to Schönefeld and Schöneweide, but in general, passenger services were limited.

Nevertheless, the railway between Berlin and Halle/Leipzig was one of the busiest lines in East Germany for long-distance traffic. For example, in 1989, more than 30 express trains ran on the section between Berlin and Bitterfeld throughout the year and additional trains ran only during the summer or on weekends. About half of these trains stopped at Bitterfeld and Wittenberg, some stopped at Jüterbog, and a few stopped at Luckenwalde. Express services, some coming from the Baltic Sea coast, ran via Halle and Erfurt to Meiningen, via Leipzig to Zwickau and Aue as well as to Gera and Saalfeld. Trains also left the network of the Reichsbahn and ran from Berlin to Karlsbad, and from Rostock to Munich. Most of the transit trains from Berlin to West Germany ran on a route via Dessau, and only came onto the Anhalt railway at Bitterfeld; only in rare cases did these trains use the line from Dennewitz junction near Jüterbog.

Starting in 1976, the railway was integrated into the new City Express (Städteexpress) network of the Deutsche Reichsbahn (East Germany) as one of its central sections, especially the section between Berlin and Bitterfeld.

List of City-Express-trains (Ex) on the Berlin–Halle railway (as of: 31 May 1991)

- Ex 100/107 Elstertal: Gera–Leipzig–Berlin
- Ex 160/167 Sachsenring: Zwickau–Berlin
- Ex 150/157 Rennsteig: Meiningen–Suhl–Erfurt–Berlin
- Ex 151/156 Berliner Bär: Berlin–Leipzig–Erfurt
- Ex 162/163 Thomaner: Leipzig–Berlin
- Ex 166/161 Lipsia: Leipzig–Berlin

=== After 1990 ===
The Anhalter Bahn lost some of its significance with German reunification. The transit trains lost their special status with the removal of border crossings between East and West Germany, and the City Express service was discontinued on 31 May 1991. The first Intercity and InterRegio trains ran at off-peak times, and did not present a service improvement, and synchronized schedules were not introduced for several years.

After reunification, these trains used the railway:

- IC line 8: Berlin–Leipzig–Nürnberg–Munich.
- IR line 15: Berlin–Halle–Erfurt–Frankfurt am Main

Long-distance service from Berlin to the south and west was routed from 1998 over the Hanover–Berlin high-speed railway and the Hanover–Würzburg high-speed railway to Frankfurt, Munich, and Basel. Even the connection between Berlin and Munich was faster over these lines than over the Anhalt railway.

In 1991, the upgrade of the Berlin-Halle/Leipzig railway was started as one of the "German Unity Transport Projects" (Verkehrsprojekt Deutsche Einheit), project number 8.3. Planning began in 1992. In 1993, the upgrade of the Berlin–Bitterfeld section to 160 km/h (99 mph) had an estimated cost of 1.95 billion Deutsche Marks. A subsequent speed increase to 200 km/h (120 mph) was proposed.

Initially, a five-kilometre (3.1 mi) section between Diedersdorf and Genshagener Heide on the Berlin Outer Ring, which then carried traffic towards the Anhalt Railway, was equipped for 160 km/h (99 mph) and was put into operation on 22 December 1992, after five months of construction. In mid-1994 around 30 km (19 mi) of track between Berlin and Bitterfeld could be operated at 160 km/h (99 mph). After eleven months of full closure for upgrading for 160 km/h (99 mph), the Halle–Bitterfeld section was reopened on 28 May 1995. The planned construction period of two years was not achieved. By the mid-1990s, the upgrade had sufficiently progressed so that continuous operations at 160 km/h (99 mph) was possible.

In 1995, the work was planned to be completed in 1999 at a total cost of 3.5 billion Deutsche Marks. The travelling time between Halle/Leipzig and Berlin would be less than an hour.

A variety of line improvements were made during the development, including the elimination of all level crossings and the modernisation of all stations. A radio-based, train-control system was planned. The scheduled journey time between Berlin and Leipzig dropped from 142 minutes, in 1990, to 100 minutes in 1995.

The upgrade to 200 km/h (120 mph) lasted until 2006. After the commissioning of the Hanover–Berlin high-speed railway in 1998, a trip from Berlin to Munich via that line and continuing via Fulda and Würzburg was faster than on this line until the end of May 2006.

On 30 April 2000, an electronic interlocking was put into operation in Luckenwalde and Trebbin in operation and connected to the existing electronic interlocking in Jüterbog. The IC 8 service was operated with ICE tilting trains from December 2002.

The so-called "mushroom concept" (Pilzkonzept), which was adopted for the planning and construction of lines connecting to the new Berlin Hauptbahnhof, included the restoration of the Anhalt Railway in the Berlin area. The north–south main line would connect Berlin Hauptbahnhof to the Anhalt Railway. This involved upgrading the Berlin–Leipzig railway for high-speed operations at up to 200 km/h (120 mph) in 2005 and 2006. A total of €1.657 billion was invested in the upgrade of the lines between Halle, Leipzig and Berlin up to the end of 2013. The investment of €9 million is still awaited.

In the Berlin area, the 16.9 km-long (10.5 mi) section of the Anhalt Railway between Berlin Südkreuz and Ludwigsfelde station was rebuilt. The design speed was raised to 160 km/h (99 mph) in the Berlin area and to 200 km/h (120 mph) outside Berlin. In addition, 18 bridges and, among other things, the stations served by regional services at Großbeeren, Teltow and Lichterfelde Ost were rebuilt. The project planning made provision for the eventual quadruplication of the line.

The upgrading of the mainline tracks of the Anhalt Railway for Intercity-Express (ICE) trains towards Leipzig, Nuremberg and Munich was put into service on 28 May 2006. The running time for long-distance services between Berlin and Leipzig was reduced from 108 minutes (from Zoo Station) to 73 minutes (from Berlin Hauptbahnhof). About one fifth more passengers were counted in the first week according to information provided by DB. The private long-distance InterConnex service and several Regional-Express and Regionalbahn services also operated on the line.

According to Deutsche Bahn, the number of ICE passengers on the line rose by 45 percent between early 2005 and May 2007. Another press release from the company indicated that the 45 percent increase was a comparison of the first four months of 2006 and of 2007.

On 1 August 2012, the Federal Railway Authority banned operations on a 15 km (9.3 mi) section between Halle and Bitterfeld after the Y-shaped steel sleepers installed in the slab track were so badly rusted that the track resistance was at risk. The ballasting of the sleepers and covering material to reduce noise meant that rain water was not drained away and led to corrosion. The problems with sleepers built in the mid-1990s meant that line speed limits were reduced from the original 160 km/h (99 mph) to 120 km/h (75 mph) and then to 50 or 30 km/h (31 or 19 mph). Trains were diverted via Delitzsch. The complete renovation of the section was originally intended to be carried out in 2015, according to Deutsche Bahn.

Demolition of the existing track began at the end of 2012. The line then received a new slab track. Deutsche Bahn invested tens of millions of Euros in the reconstruction.

It has been again possible to operate over the line at a maximum speed of 160 km/h since 29 June 2013. A planning approval process for an increase to 200 km/h was commenced in June 2013. Work had been planned to commence at the end of 2012 and to be completed in 2015. It is now expected to be completed in 2017.

Further works are planned near Halle (Saale) Hauptbahnhof in future years. These include integration to the north with the Ausbaustrecke Berlin–Halle/Leipzig (Berlin-Halle/Leipzig upgraded line project, VDE 8.3) and the renewal of track and overhead line systems in the station area. Two new electronic signalling centres will replace 20 existing signal boxes. The related financing agreement amounting to €252 million, of which €223 million would be provided by the federal government, was signed at the end of October 2012.

The market for long-distance travel between the area of Berlin and Halle (all modes) according to Deutsche Bahn amounts to around 2,500 trips per day.

=== Development of travel times ===
During 2007, the first full year of operations over the upgraded line, the shortest scheduled journey time for an off-peak ICE train without intermediate stops running to the north between Leipzig and Berlin Südkreuz was 57 minutes, while an off-peak train stopping at Wittenberg took 65 minutes. The other ICE trains took 60 minutes non-stop and 67 minutes with one stop. To the south the running times were 62 minutes (non-stop) and 67 minutes (one stop). A pair of trains (ICE 1516/1517) ran between Leipzig Hauptbahnhof and Berlin Hauptbahnhof without intermediate stops with a scheduled time of 60 minutes. Such a scheduled journey time was not maintained in the following timetables. In the 2008 timetable, the scheduled non-stop travel time running south was 60 minutes and, with one intermediate stop, 64 minutes; running north the non-stop time was 62 minutes. The overall time in the 2008 timetable was the shortest average travel time in the history of the line.

In the 2010 timetable, the scheduled travel time between Leipzig and Berlin Südkreuz was 67–75 minutes; some trains took 62 minutes. In the 2011 and 2012 timetables, the scheduled travel times were of the same order.

Between Halle Hauptbahnhof and Berlin Hauptbahnhof the fastest journey time in 2008 was 76 minutes; in 2012 it was 78 minutes. Using regional services with a change in Wittenberg (or in Bitterfeld) it takes (in the 2015 timetable) between 147 and 151 minutes. Because of line closure between Bitterfeld and Halle and the resulting detour the scheduled travel times was extended by up to 15 minutes.

== Accidents ==
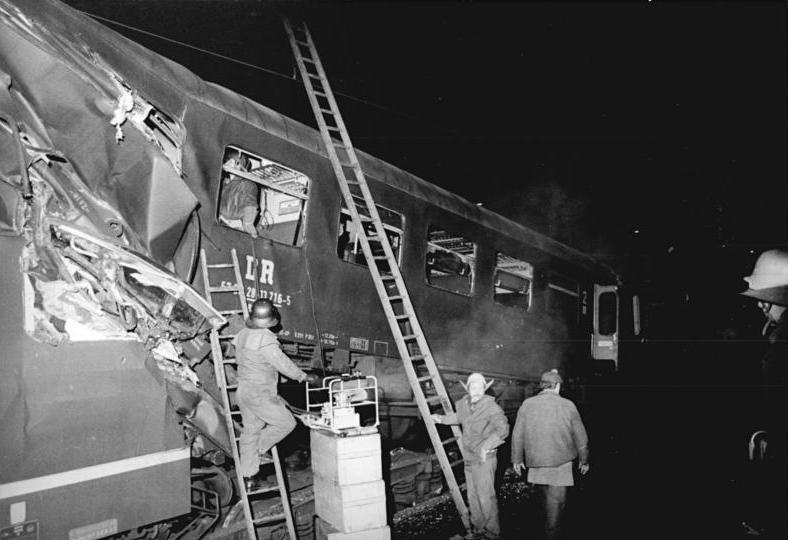
Rescue work after the accident of 29 February 1984

A military train derailed near Trebbin on 1 March 1962 after a tanks gun barrel swung lose into an oncoming express train. The resulting derailment caused a pile up of wagons transporting Soviet military personnel, at least 70 of which were killed. One passenger from the express train was also killed.

A serious accident occurred at Forst Zinna (near Jüterbog) on 19 January 1988. An express train ran at 120 km/h (75 mph) into a Soviet tank that was on the tracks. Six people died and 33 others were seriously injured.

A D 354 express and the P 7523 stopping train crashed into each other at Hohenthurm on 29 February 1984. 11 people died and 46 were injured.

A freight train derailed just outside Pratau station near Wittenberg on 29 May 1988 and 18 carriages fell over.

== Technical equipment ==
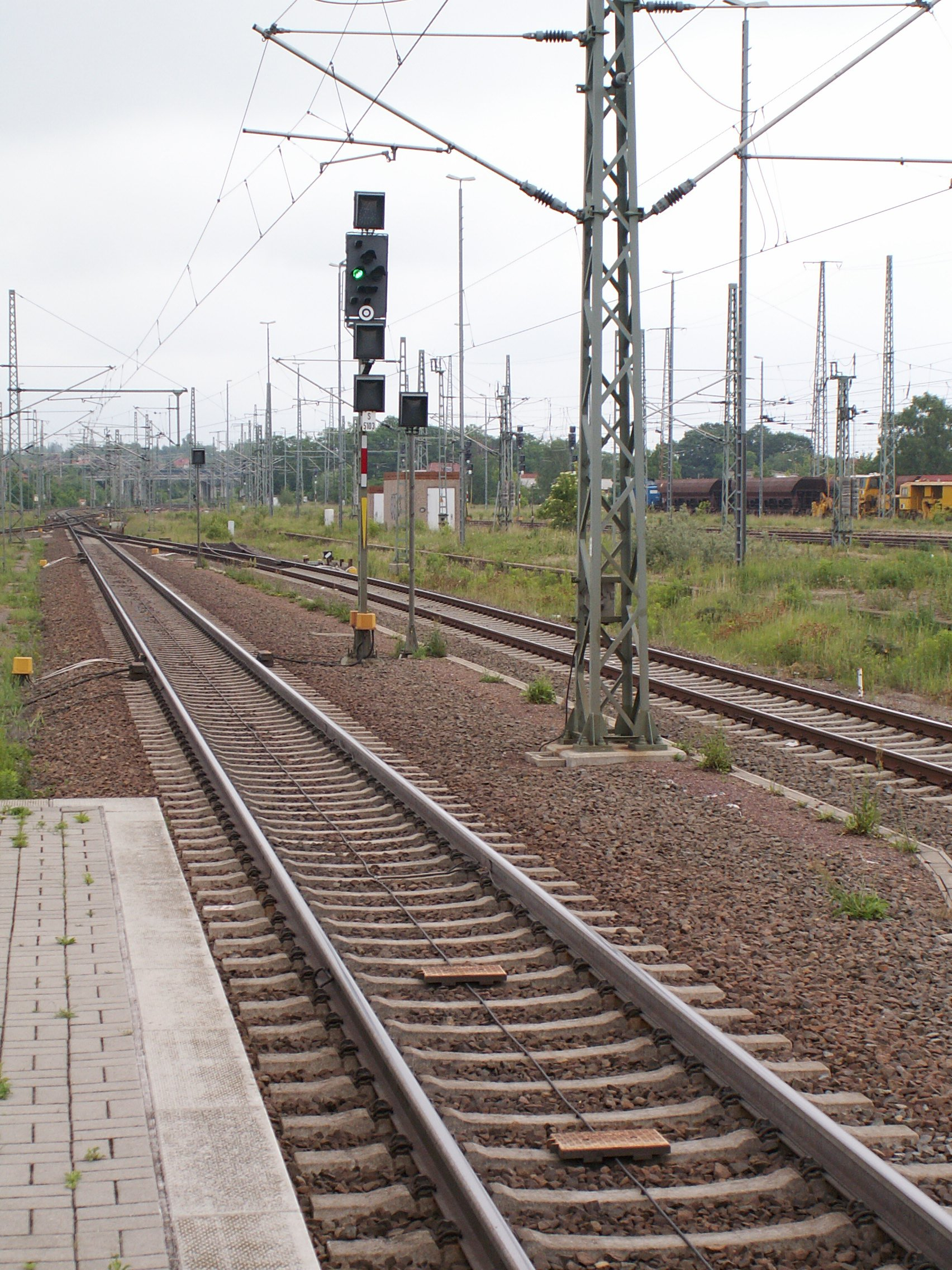
Two ETCS balises at the beginning of a section of line controlled by the Linienzugbeeinflussung signalling system before a Ks signal to the north of platform 3 of Lutherstadt Wittenberg station

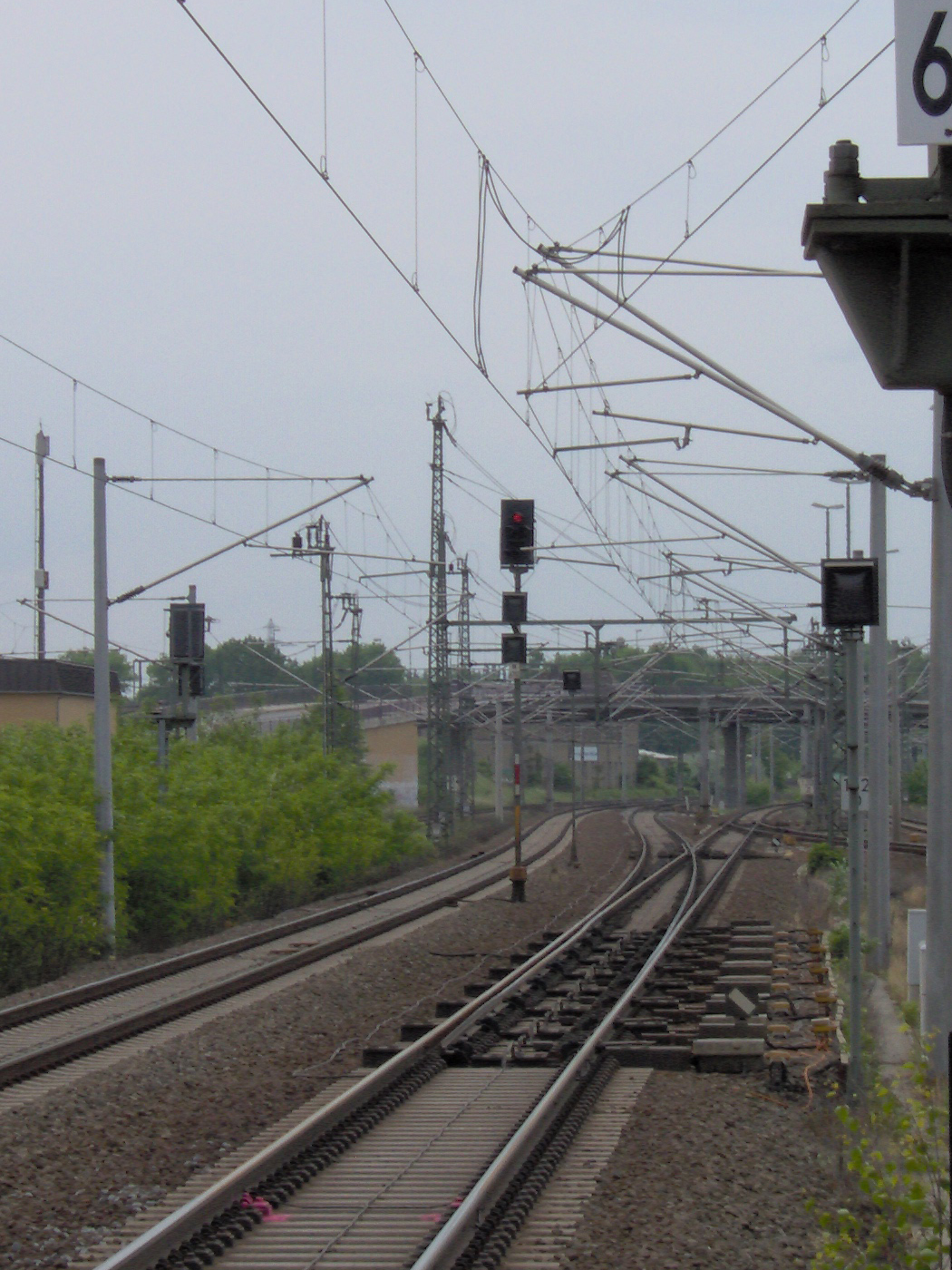
High-speed set of points to the south of the platforms of Bitterfeld station

Electric operation started early on part of the Anhalt line. The Bitterfeld–Dessau section of the Trebnitz–Leipzig railway was electrified as a test track in 1911. Electrification on the Bitterfeld–Leipzig section was put into operation on 5 June 1914. However, the electrical equipment was disconnected on 1 August 1914 year. In 1922, it was reinstated, but a planned extension to Berlin was abandoned because of the outbreak of the Second World War. In March 1946, the catenary systems had to be dismantled for war reparations to the Soviet Union. Electrical operations on the Leipzig–Dessau line were restored on 9 July 1958. Electrification of the Anhalt line commenced in 1976 and the whole line was open for electrical operation by 1984.

It was clear that the signalling technology was the responsibility of the individual Reichsbahn divisions. While the Ludwigsfelde–Dennewitz section, which was controlled by the Berlin Reichsbahn division, was equipped until 1978 with track plan interlockings (including the first interlocking of the GsIIISp68 class in Jüterbog station) and automatic block signalling, the Niedergörsdorf–Leipzig section, which was controlled by the Halle Reichsbahn division, continued to be signalled with conventional systems. As part of its resignalling with the Punktförmige Zugbeeinflussung train protection system the remaining semaphore signals were replaced by colour light signals. During the upgrade to 200 km/h, the whole line was equipped with electronic interlockings between 1992 and 1999. Since then continuous two-way working has been possible, using only Kombinationsignale (combination signals). During the remodelling of Muldenstein station, moveable point frogs were inserted into the continuous track at the northern end of the station. In addition, all level crossings were eliminated and new bridges were built. These included the northern Mulde flood bridge near Muldenstein, the Mulde bridge and the Leine bridge. These three new prestressed concrete girder bridges replaced arch bridges built in 1857.

The longest set of points in the world was installed in Bitterfeld station in January 1998. This 169.2 metre-long construction is passable at 220 km/h (in normal operations at up to 200 km/h) on the diverging track. Switch 03 at the northern end of Bitterfeld station thus allows trains from Leipzig to Berlin to pass through on the line from Halle without reducing speed. The point blades are each 59 metres long and weigh 120 tons, including their support mechanism.

In preparation for the installation of the European Train Control System (ETCS), a 15 km test section between Bitterfeld and Gräfenhainichen was put into full operation in 2001. To adapt the control system of the Deutsche Bahn to the newly agreed European Standard, ETCS Level 2 was installed on part of this line for the first time in Germany. Around 1,200 balises were installed. On 26 May 2006, a pair of Intercity (IC) services (2418/2419) were equipped with ETCS for speeds of up to 200 km/h. On 17 June 2006, for the first time in Europe, a scheduled service ran under ETCS at a speed of 200 km/h. The trains pairs of IC 2418/2419 and 2416/2417 IC and EN 228/229 ran under ETCS. Five class 101 locomotives were fitted with ETCS for the test runs up to mid-2001.

A working definition of ETCS only became available much later than originally planned, delaying the achievement of a speed of 200 km/h that had been a target since the beginning of the project in 1992. If this speed could not have been achieved, funds would have had to be repaid to the European Union. To avoid this, the line between Bitterfeld and Berlin (10.6 km) was equipped with Linienzugbeeinflussung (class LZB L72 CE II) with CIR-ELKE II in 2005 and 2006. Only the main through tracks and the connections between them are equipped with these control systems.

=== Line condition and speed ===
Between Teltow (near Berlin) (12.36 km) and Bitterfeld (132.10 km) it has been possible to the operate on the since 28 May 2006 at 200 km/h. However, in the area of Wittenberg (km 92.9 to 97.5) the scheduled maximum speed limit is 160 km/h. From June 2010 to 13 December 2013, there were two sections, each around ten km long, Graefenhainichen–Muldenstein (km 126 to 116) and Blönsdorf–Zahna (km 84 to 75) that could be operated at only 160 km/h. Since December 2013, these sections can be operated at 200 km/h again. The reason for the three-year speed limit was the lack of new hot box detectors.
