= Grünau (Leipzig) =

- Stadtteil of Leipzig
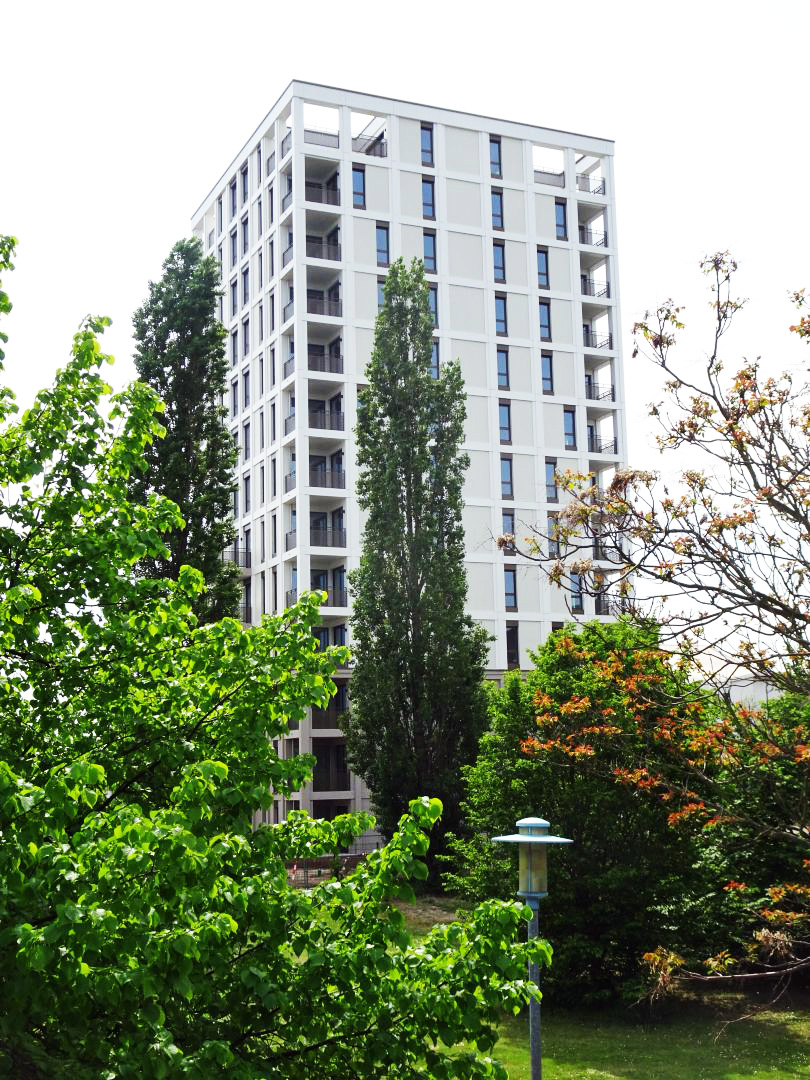
- Interactive map of Grünau
- Location within Germany Location within Saxony
- Coordinates: 51°19′10″N 12°17′25″E
- Country: Germany
- State: Saxony
- District: Urban district
- City: Leipzig

Area
  - Total: 8.7 km^{2} (3.4 sq mi)

Population (2023)
  - Total: 49,100
  - Density: 5,600/km^{2} (15,000/sq mi)
- Time zone: UTC+01:00 (CET)
  - Summer (DST): UTC+02:00 (CEST)
- Postal codes: 04205, 04207, 04209
- Dialling codes: 0341

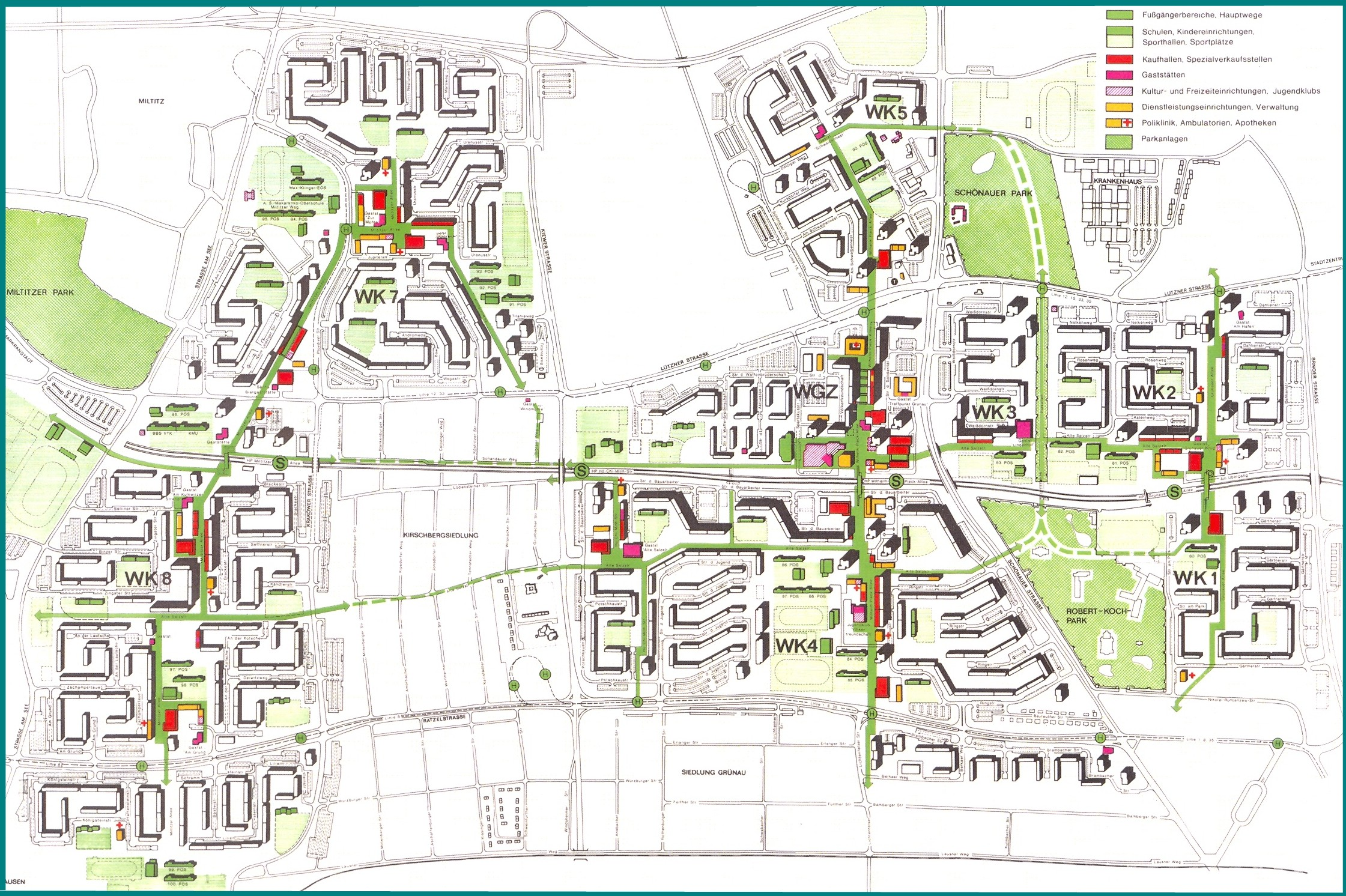
Grünau how it was planned in 1985

Grünau (German pronunciation: [ɡʁyːˈnaʊ]) is a large housing estate in the western part of Leipzig, Germany, designed in the 1970s and 1980s. It dominates the Stadtbezirk Leipzig-West. In its short history Grünau was at times the most populated district of Leipzig with a maximum of 85,000 inhabitants (1989).

Together with Marzahn (Berlin) and Halle-Neustadt, the large housing estate of Grünau was one of the largest prefabricated housing estates (so-called Plattenbau) of East Germany and is the largest settlement of this type in Saxony. It consists of eight Wohnkomplex (translation: residential complexes, abbreviation WK) with large apartment buildings of the dwelling series WBS 70. Despite the good infrastructure, the population of Grünau declined rapidly after 1990. In 2010, the district lost more than half of its residents and thousands of apartments were demolished. At the same time, due to the increasing aging and the settlement of low-income families, there is a negative trend in the age and social structure of this residential area. Since 2010, the population has slowly increased again.

== Location and outline ==
The housing estate on the western outskirts of Leipzig is located 6 km (3.7 mi) from the city center and covers an area of 4.5 km (2.8 mi) east-west by 2.5 km (1.6 mi) north-south. It was planned for 100,000 inhabitants with 8 so-called Wohnkomplex (WK). There are Wohnkomplex 1 to 8, with WK 6 never built. The Stadtbezirk Leipzig-West, which for the most part consists of the Grünau housing estate, is divided into the localities of Grünau-Ost (WK 1 to 3), Grünau-Mitte (WK 4 and 5.2), Schönau (Schönauer Viertel, WK 5.1 and Lindenauer Hafen), Grünau-Nord (WK 7), Lausen-Grünau (WK 8 and the village of Lausen, incorporated in 1995) as well as two localities not characterised by prefabricated buildings: Grünau-Siedlung and Miltitz, incorporated in 1999.

=== Localities of the borough Leipzig-West ===
Grünau Ost

Grünau-Mitte

Schönau

Grünau-Nord

Lausen-Grünau

Grünau-Siedlung

Miltitz

== History ==
Today's large residential complex Grünau was built on a green field on the outskirts of Leipzig. Since 1793, the old Lützner Land- und Heerstraße led from Leipzig to Lützen and then to Weißenfels in today's Lützner Straße. The name Grünau does not derive from a village that was located there, but from a garden settlement belonging to the Leipzig-Kleinzschocher locality that was laid out in the 1920s on the southern edge of today's large settlement. At the beginning of the 20th century it was here, near the former Plagwitz-Pörsten railway line, part of the agricultural property of the Vorwerk Lausen.

On Lützner Straße, west of the village of Schönau, there was a barracks built in the time of the Reichswehr and then used first by the Wehrmacht and then by the Group of Soviet Forces in Germany. On 24 September 1982 there was a chain reaction with the explosion of ammunition in the barracks, several schools were evacuated. After 1991, when the last Soviet soldiers left, a residential, commercial and recreational area, the Schönauer Viertel, with single-family houses and a shopping centre developed on the site of the former barracks.

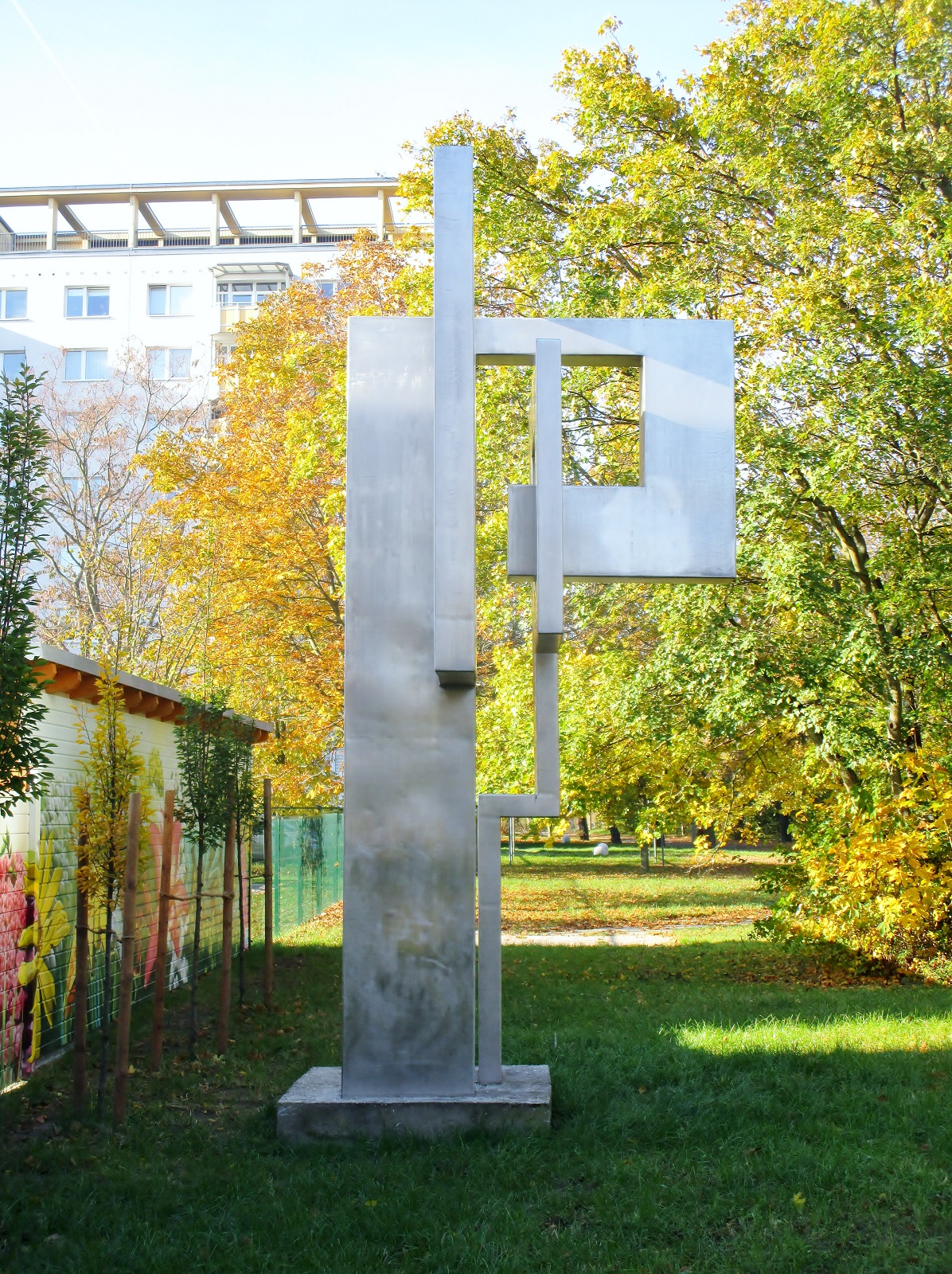
The memorial commemorates the laying of the foundation stone in 1976

On 1 June 1976, Mayor Karl-Heinz Müller laid the foundation stone for the large housing estate on the northern edge of WK 1. On the occasion of the tenth anniversary, a memorial was erected on this site. By the end of the 1980s, eight industrial prefabricated housing estates had been built in the localities of Kleinzschocher, Schönau (partly demolished due to construction), Lausen and Großmiltitz. Between 1976 and 1982, mainly 5-storey prefabricated buildings with relatively large green areas were built.

After 1990, shopping and leisure opportunities improved. In 1995, the PEP shopping centre was opened, in 1996 the Allee-Center and next to it an eight-screen multiplex cinema, today's Cineplexx Leipzig. There are also 321 retail stores in Grünau. The Grünauer Welle indoor swimming pool (with sports pool) was opened in 1999 and the Kulkwitzer See, which has been a local recreation area since 1973, are used by residents for local recreation. The artificial climbing wall K4, the largest outdoor climbing structure in Leipzig, has been located in Grünau since 2001. In 2010, a new venue for the children's and youth theatre Theatrium on the Alte Salzstraße in Grünau-Ost was built for 1.2 million euros. In terms of cultural and leisure activities, the district is considered to be poorly equipped in terms of infrastructure, despite "selective offerings". The centre of Grünau is formed by the area around Lützner Straße and Stuttgarter Allee.

Despite these efforts, it was not possible to avoid the process of demographic contraction.

Population development of Grünau
	1979	1981	1983	1989	1992	1995	1999	2002	2004	2005	2008	2010	2016
Residenti	16.000	36.000	60.000	85.000	78.000	74.000	63.500	61.000	49.400	48.000	42.500	40.700	43.600

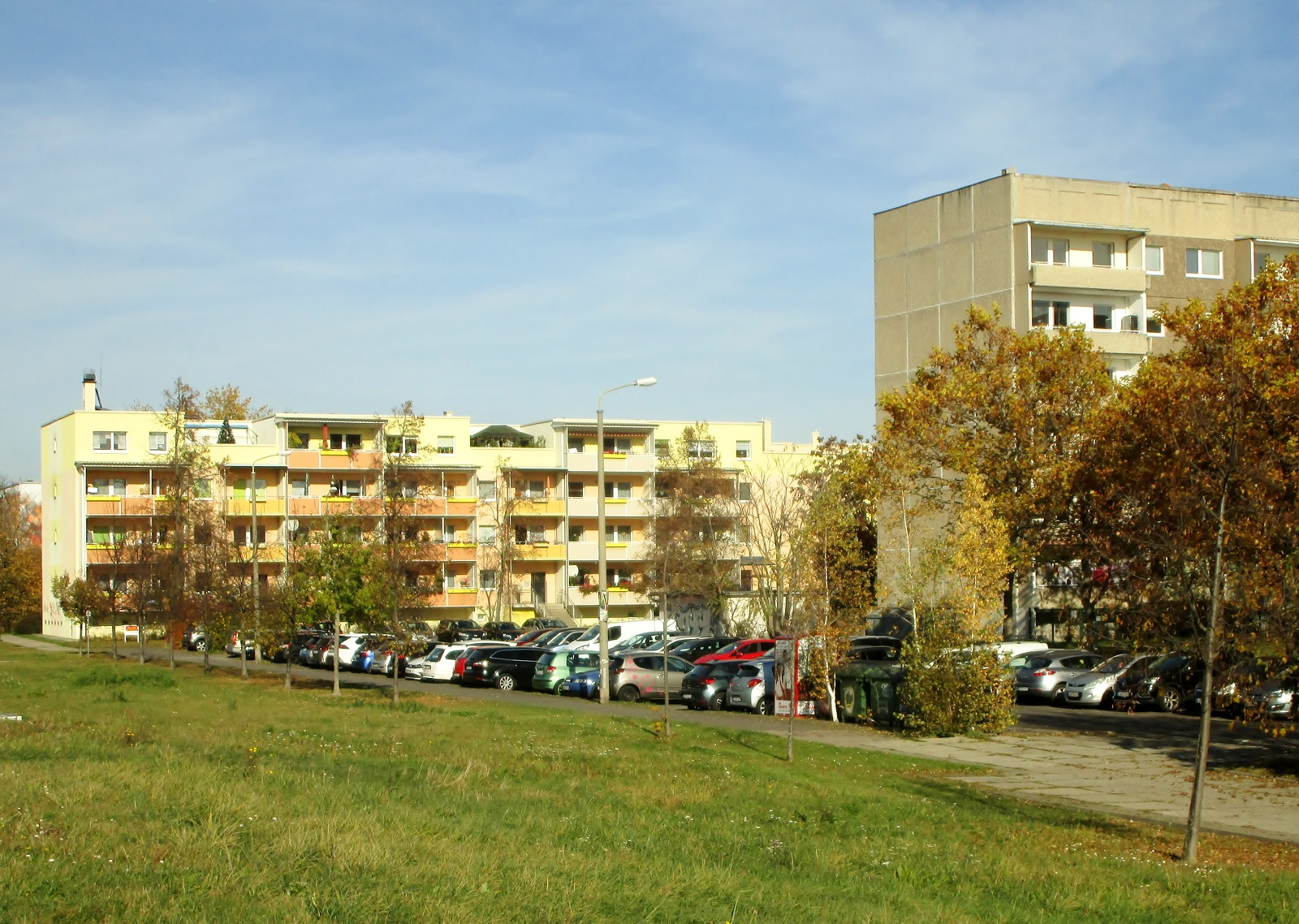
WBS 70 converted into a terraced house

The city responded in 1999 with a "reasonable pact" with the most important real estate companies in Grünau, including the city-owned Leipziger Wohnungs- und Baugesellschaft (LWB) and half a dozen cooperatives. The motto was "More quality with fewer houses". In the dismantling phase from 2000 to 2015, almost all of the PH 16 high-rise buildings were demolished, including numerous large blocks of flats, with a total of 8,000 apartments. The LWB began in December 2000 with the dismantling of the high-rise building (PH 16) at Garskestraße 5, which had been built in 1982 as a hotel for construction workers and had not been used since 1997. But it was not just demolished. Since May 2008, the six-story buildings at Uranusstrasse have been converted into townhouses with an innovative heating system. In 2014, the housing cooperative UNITAS demolished a six-story building on four floors. In March 2013, the housing cooperative Lipsia announced its plans to demolish the six-story building in Zschampertaue and build three new unique townhouses in the neighbourhood. They were ready for occupation in summer 2015.

By then, the demographic decline had already come to a halt. Since around 2014, Grünau has benefited in part from the migration gains following the strong increase in the overall population in the city of Leipzig. A consolidation phase begins. The housing cooperative Lipsia has made the most striking structural statement with a 13-storey high-rise that was built on the demolition site of its former eleven-storey building on Brackestraße (Lipsia Tower, completion 2020). The Ingriertes Stadtteilentwicklungskonzept Leipzig-Grünau 2030 (Integrated district development concept Leipzig-Grünau 2030) is seen as an urban development guideline for renewed densification and the creation of spatial relationships. Afterwards, «the demolition was essential to maintain the attractiveness of Grünau, to create new qualities and to pave the way for the necessary differentiation of the housing supply».

== Parks ==
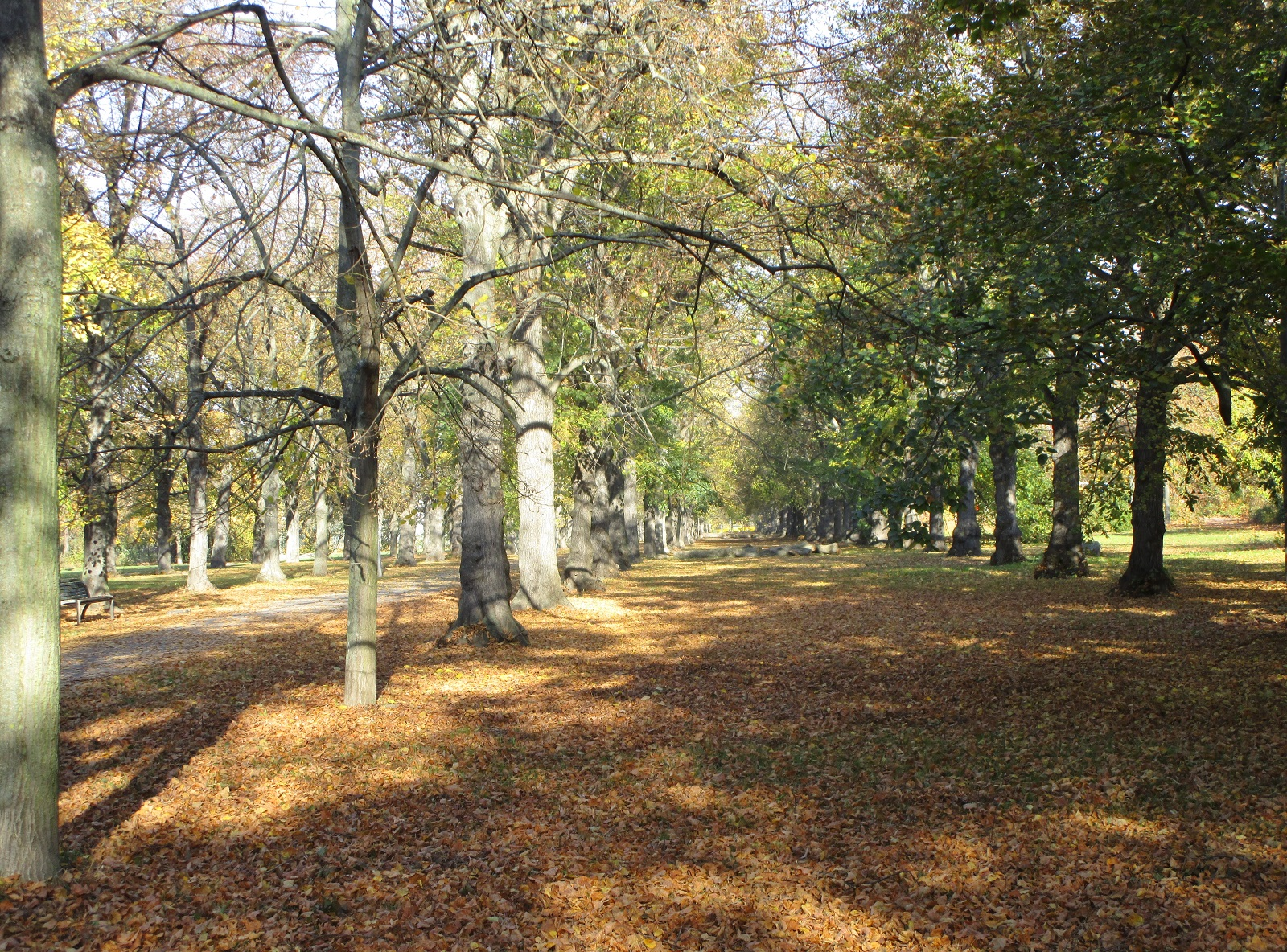
Parkallee (Park Avenue) with four rows of lime trees

There are the Schönauer Park (Schönau Park) with a total area of 14 hectares (35 acres) and the Robert-Koch-Park with 25 hectares (62 acres). The Parkallee (Park avenue) from 1911/12 with four rows of lime trees was created as a connection between the two parks. Together they are today under cultural heritage management. However, the S-Bahn railway line has interrupted the connection since the 1970s.

Schönau Park was created from a manor park and today serves primarily as a local recreation area for the residents of the north-eastern parts of the Grünau prefabricated housing estate. It is bordered to the south by Lützner Straße. The two main entrances are to the west and south.

The Robert-Koch Park is in the Grünau-Ost locality, completed in 1913, open to the public since 1984 and on whose grounds the Robert Koch Clinic is located as a branch of the St. Georg Clinic. The park becomes a cultural, recreational and educational center for the inhabitants of Grünau, renovation work began in 2021.

== Public transport ==
=== S-Bahn ===
From Leipzig-Plagwitz station, a 4.1 km (2.5 mi) long S-Bahn line runs to the following four stations within Grünau:

- Leipzig Grünauer Allee
- Leipzig Allee Center
- Leipzig Karlsruher Straße
- Leipzig Miltitzer Allee

The stations are served by lines S 1 and S 10 of the Central Germany S-Bahn.

In the long term, an extension of the railway north of Lake Kulkwitz to the Leipzig–Großkorbetha line in the direction of Markranstädt is also planned, which would also allow the S-Bahn line to continue via Großkorbetha on the Halle–Bebra line to Weißenfels or Merseburg.

=== Tram ===
The Leipzig tram lines 1, 2, 8 and 15 serve the area. All lines end in Grünau.

== Images ==
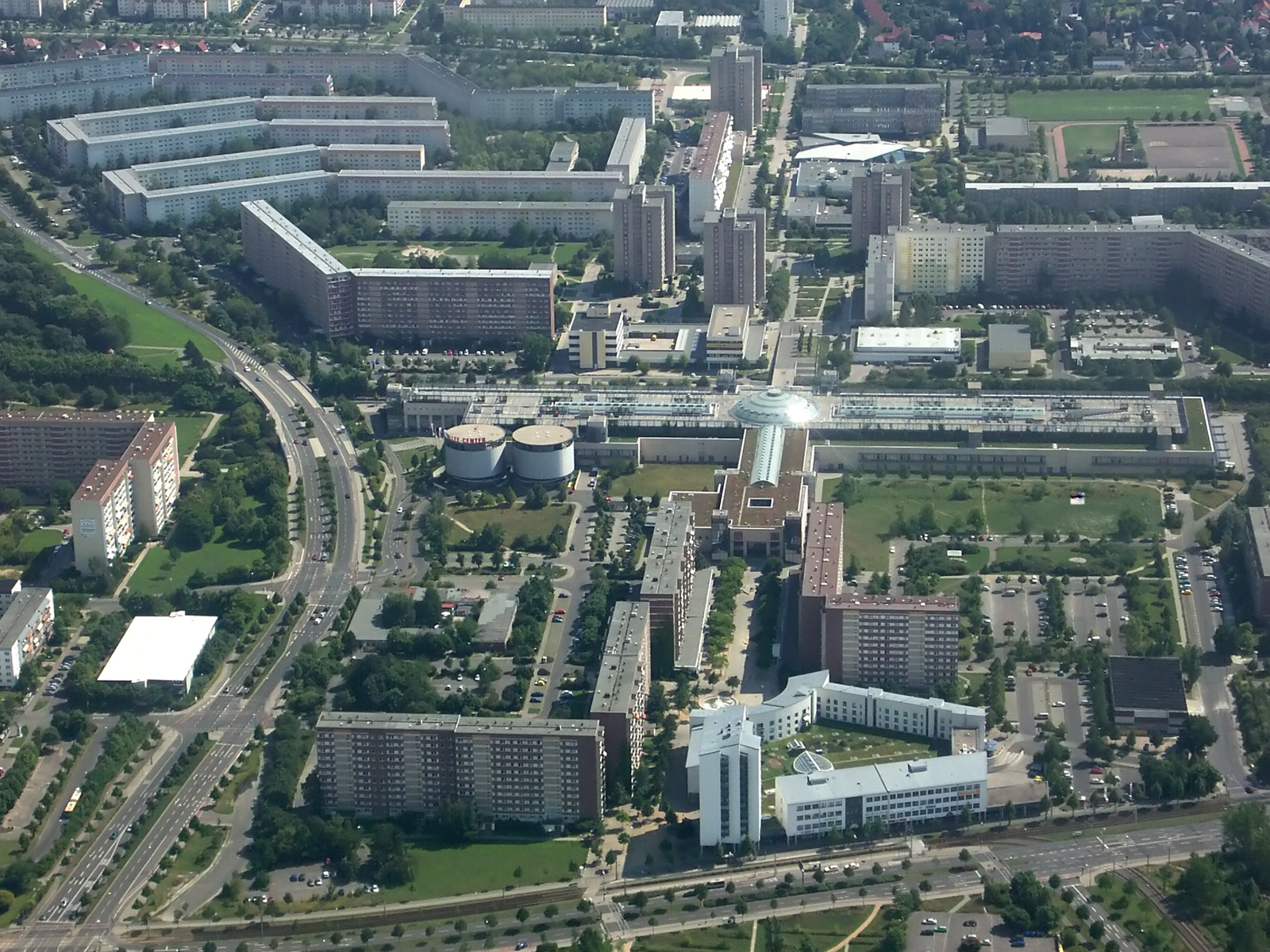
Allee Center (center of image)

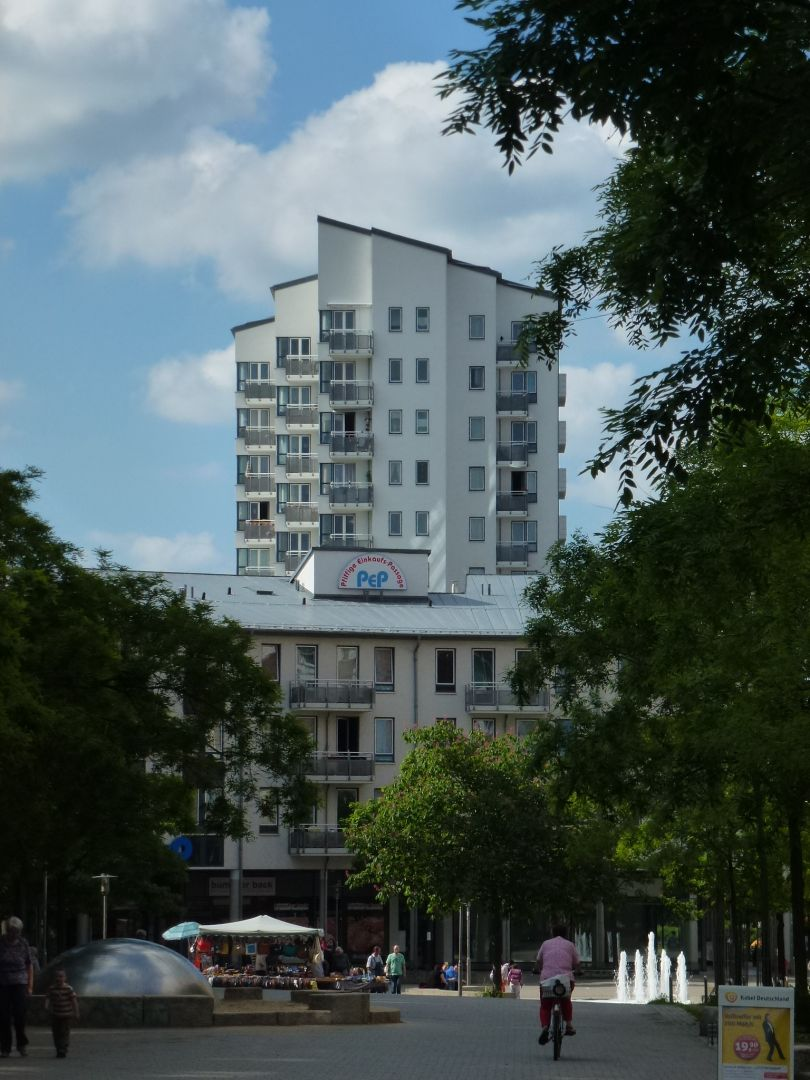
PEP shopping center behind a prefabricated building

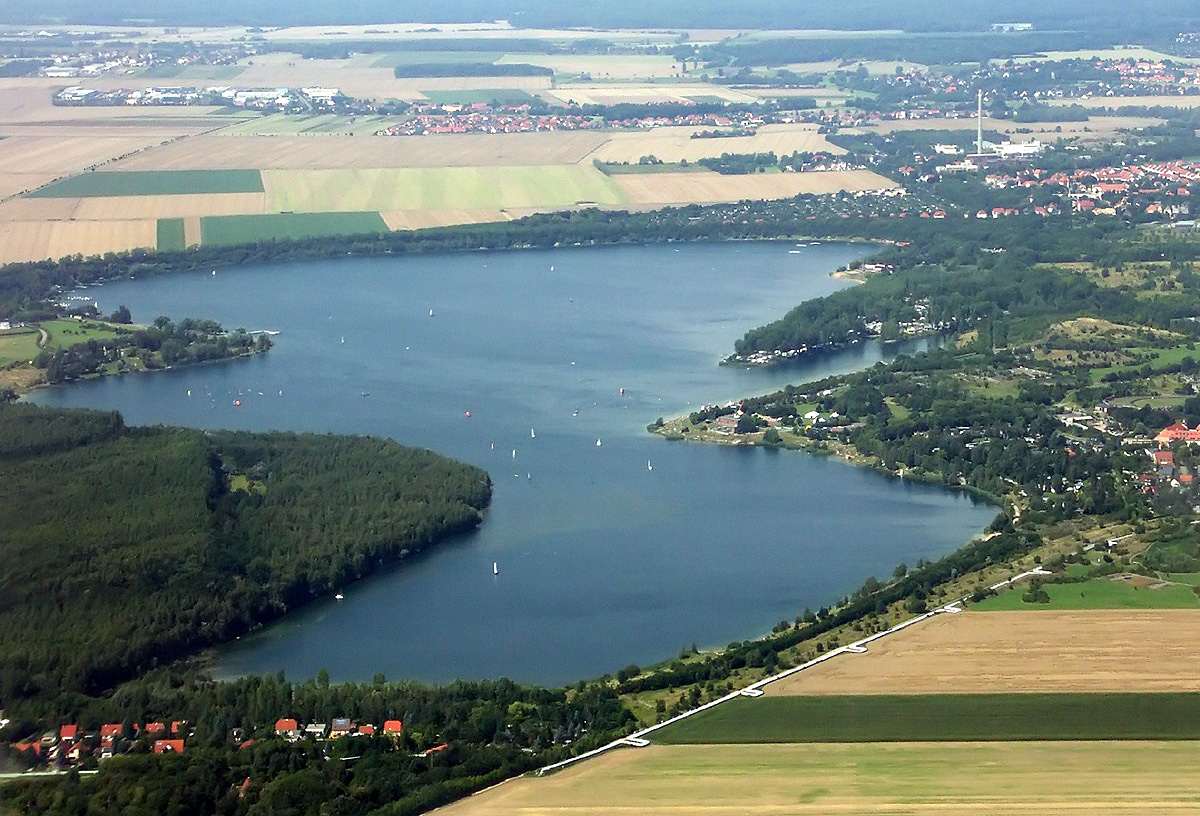
Kulkwitzer See (Lake Kulkwitz)

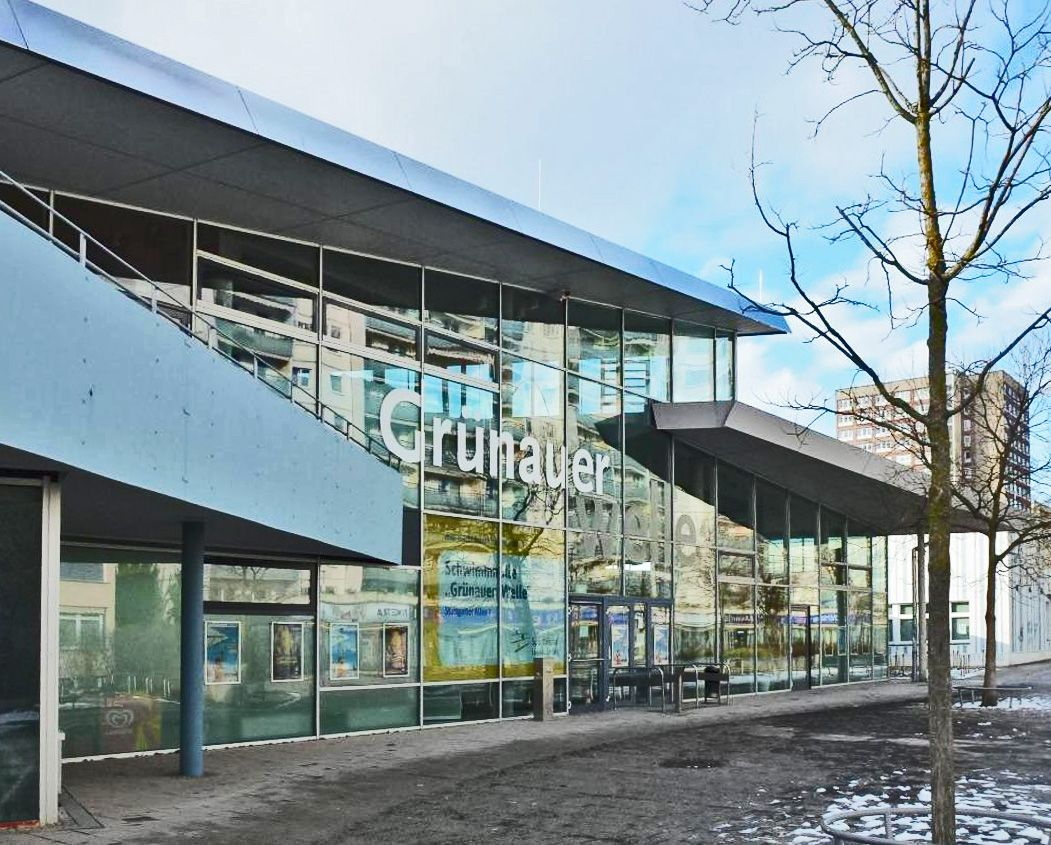
Indoor swimming pool
„Grünauer Welle“

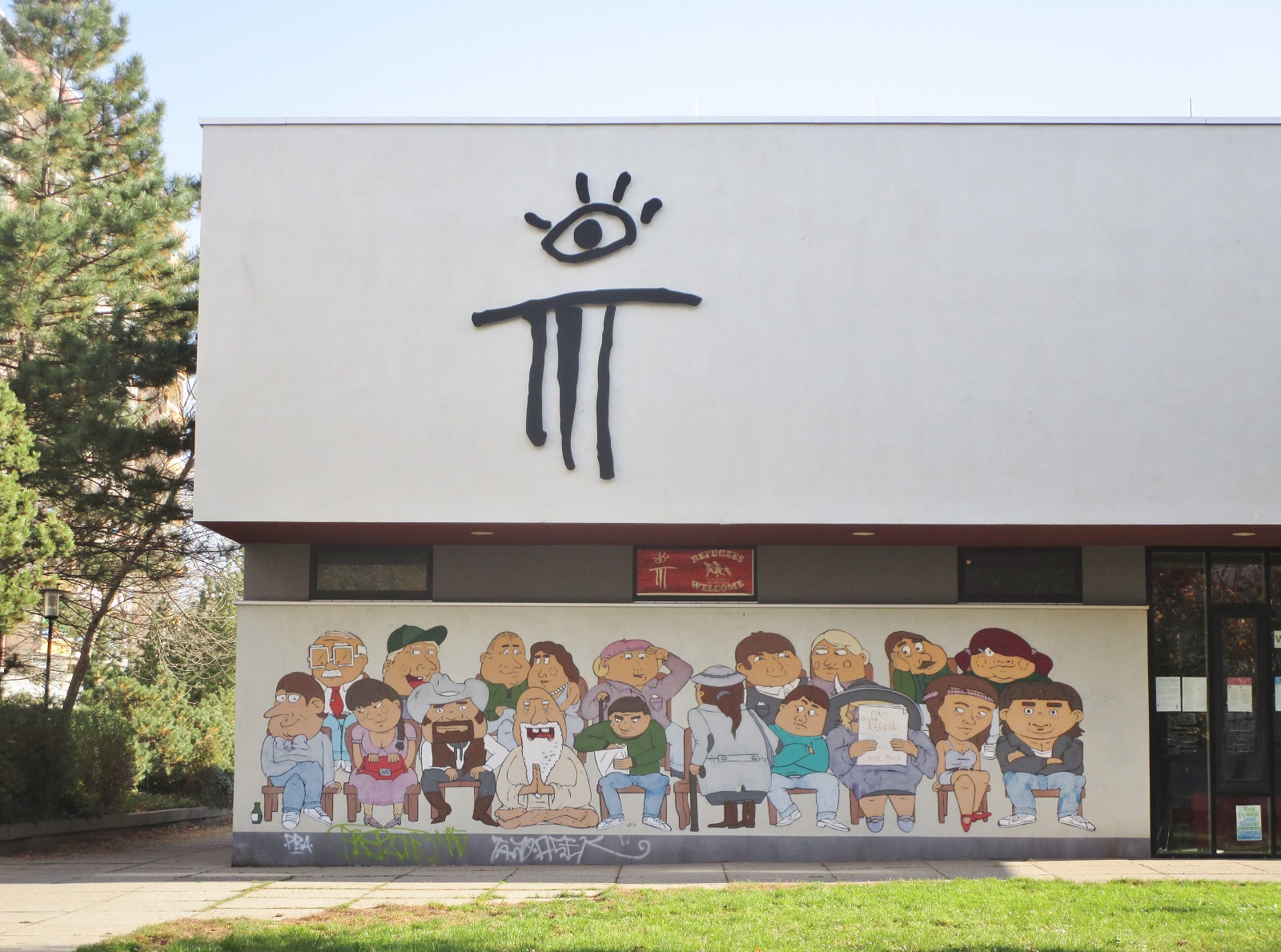
Theatrium on Alte Salzstrasse

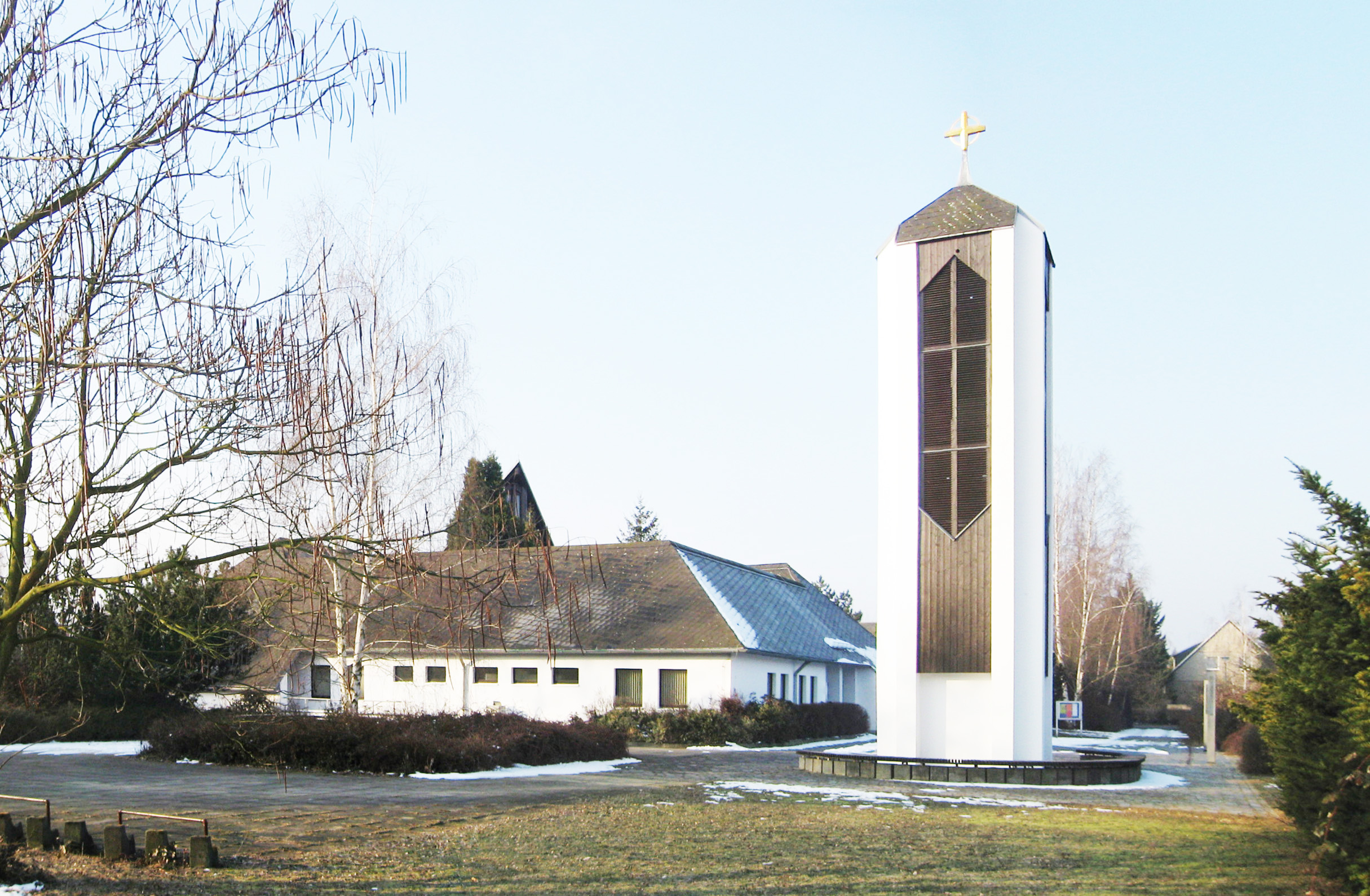
Church St. Paul

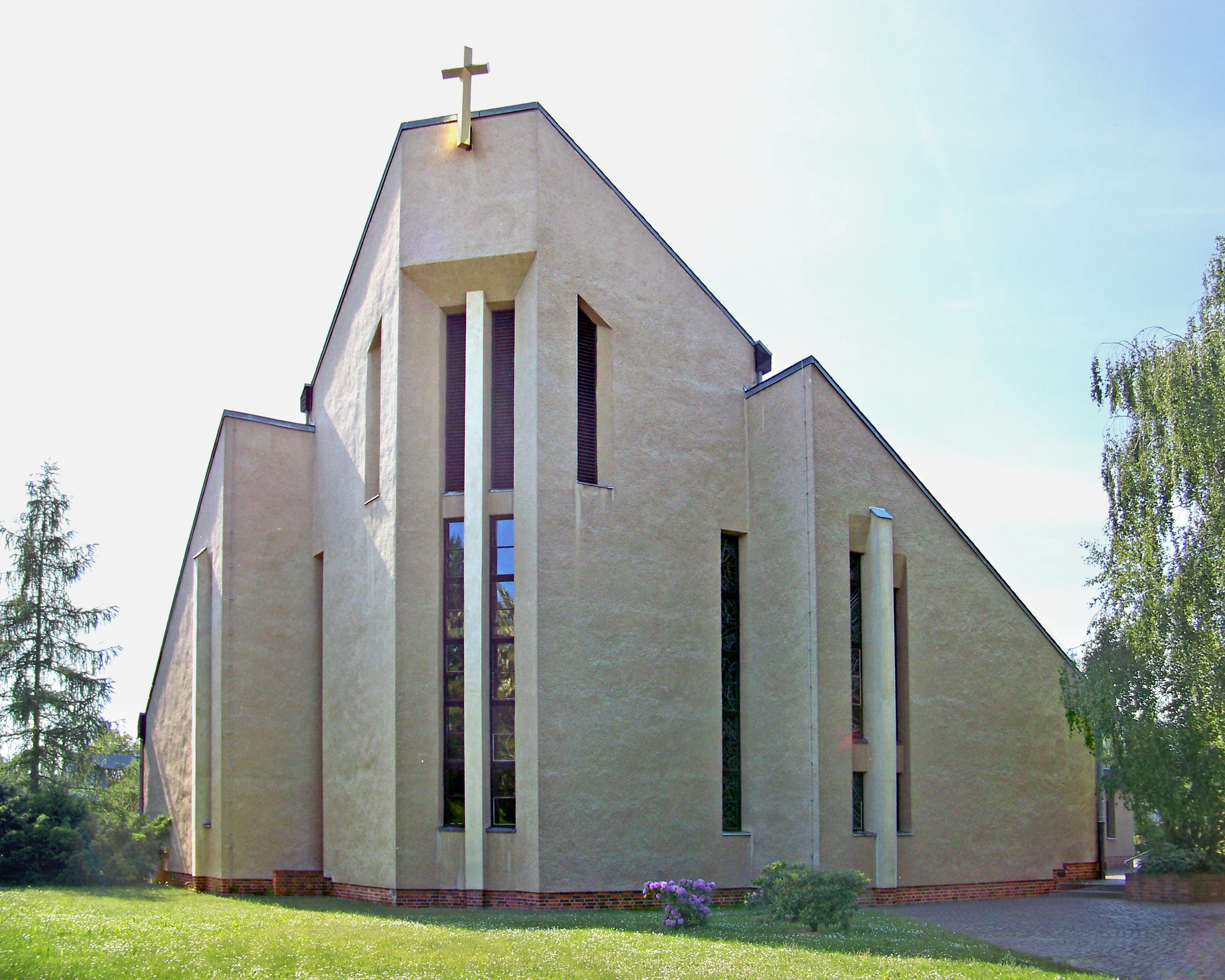
Church St. Martin

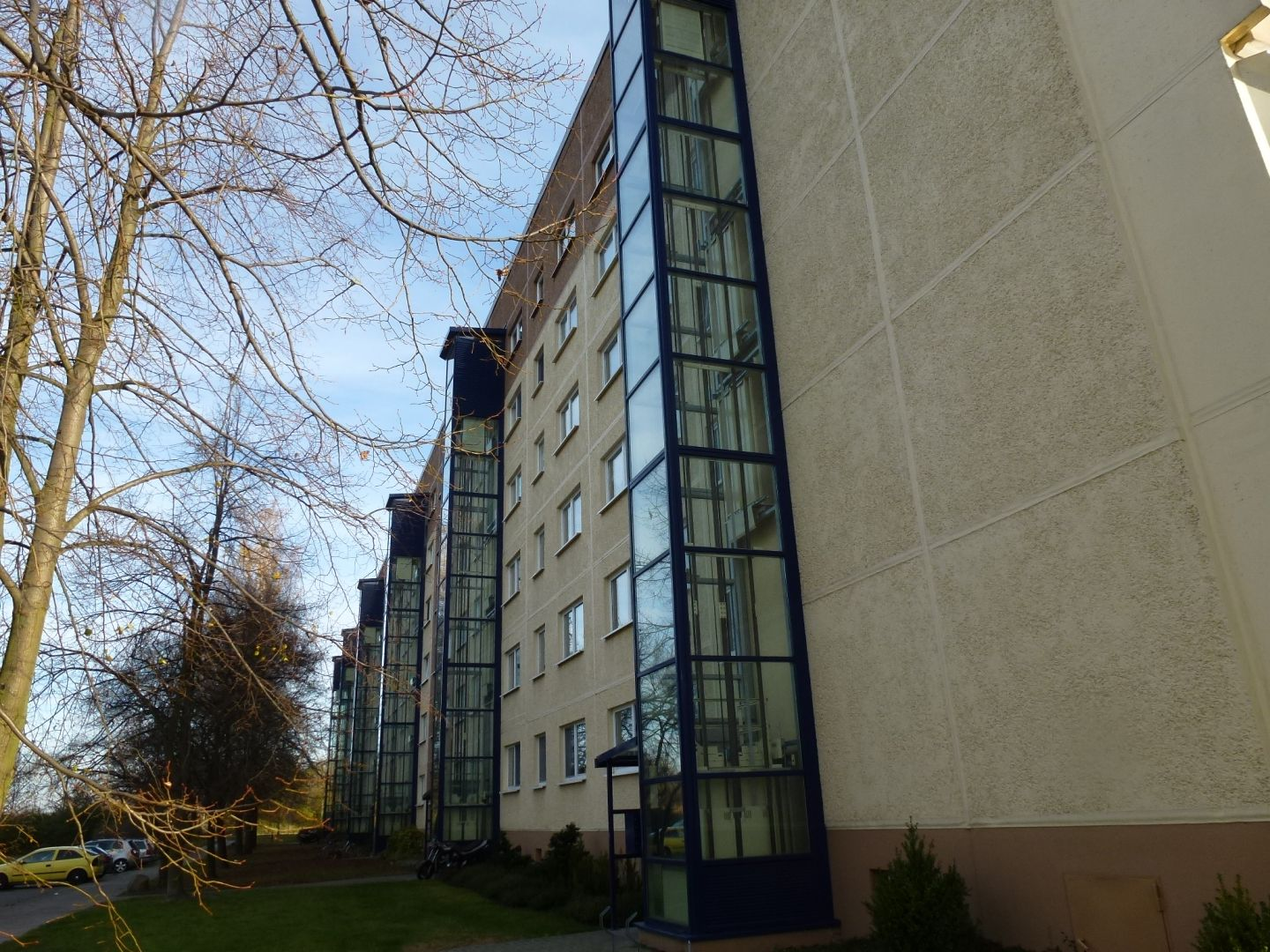
External elevators on renovated prefabricated building in WK 7

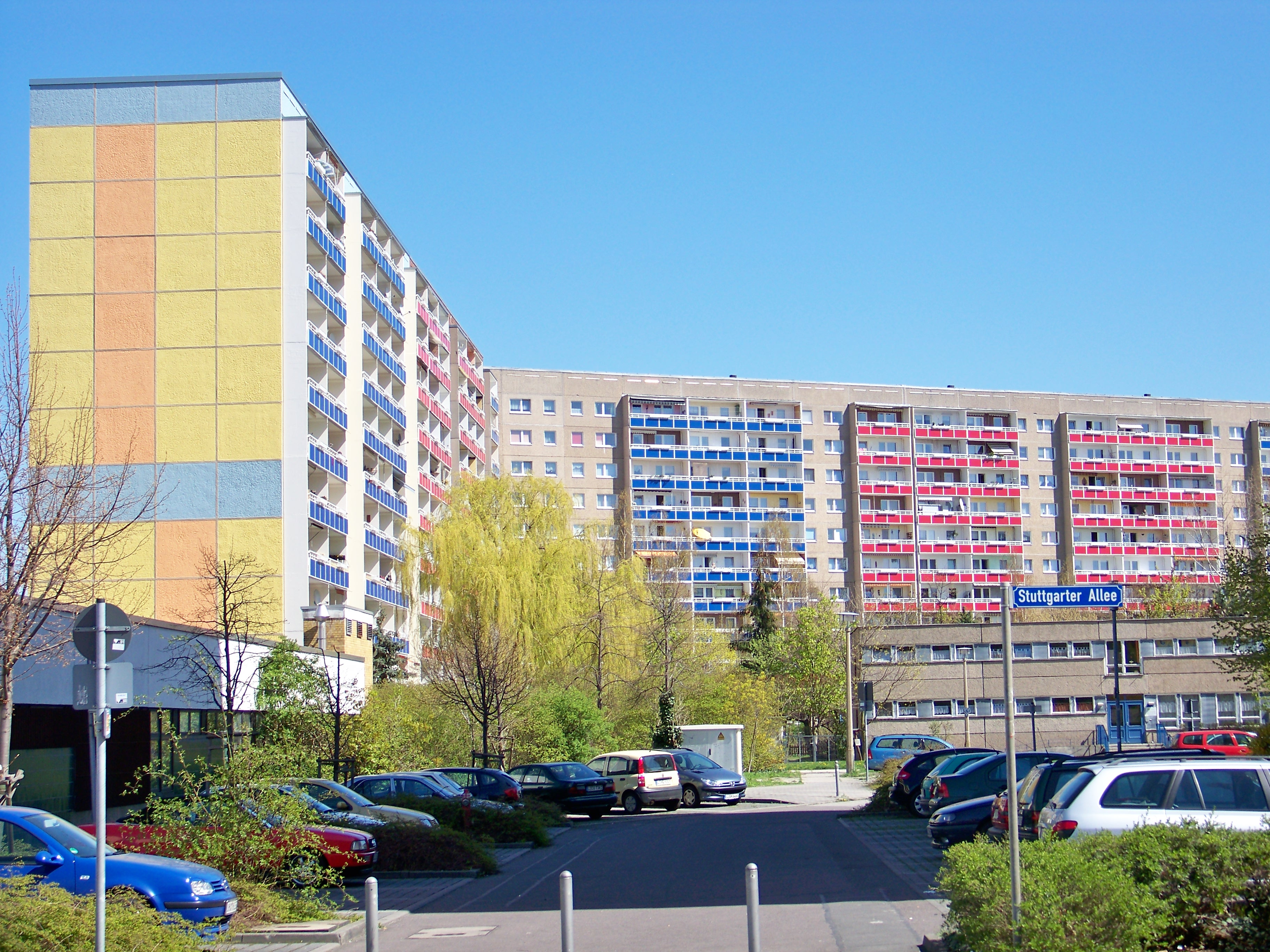
Renovated prefabricated building in Stuttgarter Allee/Breisgaustrasse
