= Günter Behnisch =

German architect (1922–2010)

- Born: 12 June 1922; Lockwitz, Germany
- Died: 12 July 2010 (aged 88); Stuttgart, Germany
- Education: University of Stuttgart
- Occupation: Architect
- Practice: Behnisch & Partner

Günter Behnisch (12 June 1922 – 12 July 2010) was a German architect, born in Lockwitz, near Dresden. During the Second World War he became one of Germany's youngest submarine commanders. Subsequently, Behnisch became one of the most prominent architects representing deconstructivism. His prominent projects included the Olympic Park in Munich and the new West German parliament in Bonn.

== Early life ==
Behnisch was born the second of three children, in Lockwitz near Dresden. He attended a number of schools, due to the fact his Social Democrat father was arrested, sacked and redeployed to Chemnitz by the new Nazi government.

In 1939, Behnisch volunteered to join the navy (Kriegsmarine), aged 17, which was a less onerous alternative to compulsory labour service, or army conscription. He eventually became a U-boat officer and served aboard U-952. In October 1944, he became one of the youngest U-boat commanders, when he commissioned U-2337. At the end of the Second World War he surrendered his submarine to the British and became a prisoner of war in Featherstone Castle in Northumberland.

Behnisch initially trained as a bricklayer then, in 1947 enrolled to study architecture at the Technical University in Stuttgart. From 1967 to 1987 he was a professor for architectural/building design and industrial building technology at the Technische Hochschule Darmstadt.

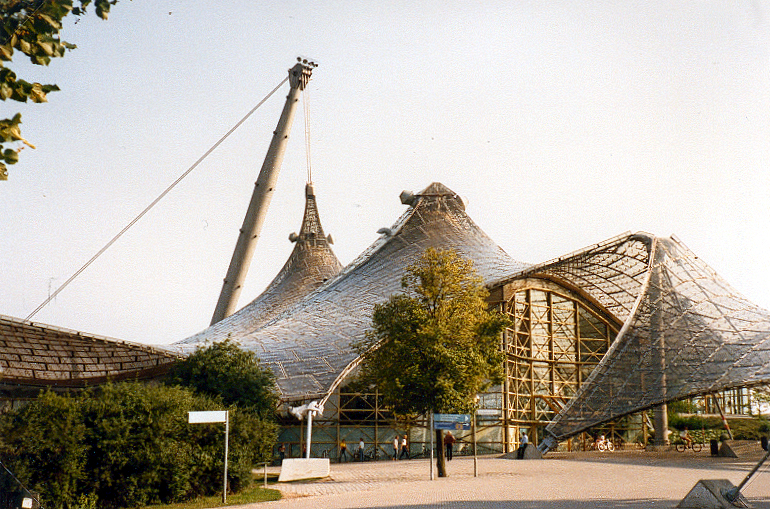
Olympic Park in Munich (1972)

== Architectural career ==
He established his own architecture practice in Stuttgart in 1952, which in 1966 became Behnisch & Partner.

In 1967, the architecture firm of Günther Behnisch was selected to developed a comprehensive master plan for the sports and recreation area of the 1972 Summer Olympics in Munich. The area in known as Olympiapark (Olympic Park) and it includes the Olympiastadion (Olympic Stadium). The stadium's tensile structure was developed in cooperation with architect and engineer Frei Otto. One of Behnisch's most notable buildings was the new parliament in the West German capital, Bonn. Although he won the architectural design competition in 1973, the construction only began in 1987, and was completed in 1992.

His son Stefan Behnisch established a separate firm, Behnisch Architekten in 1989.

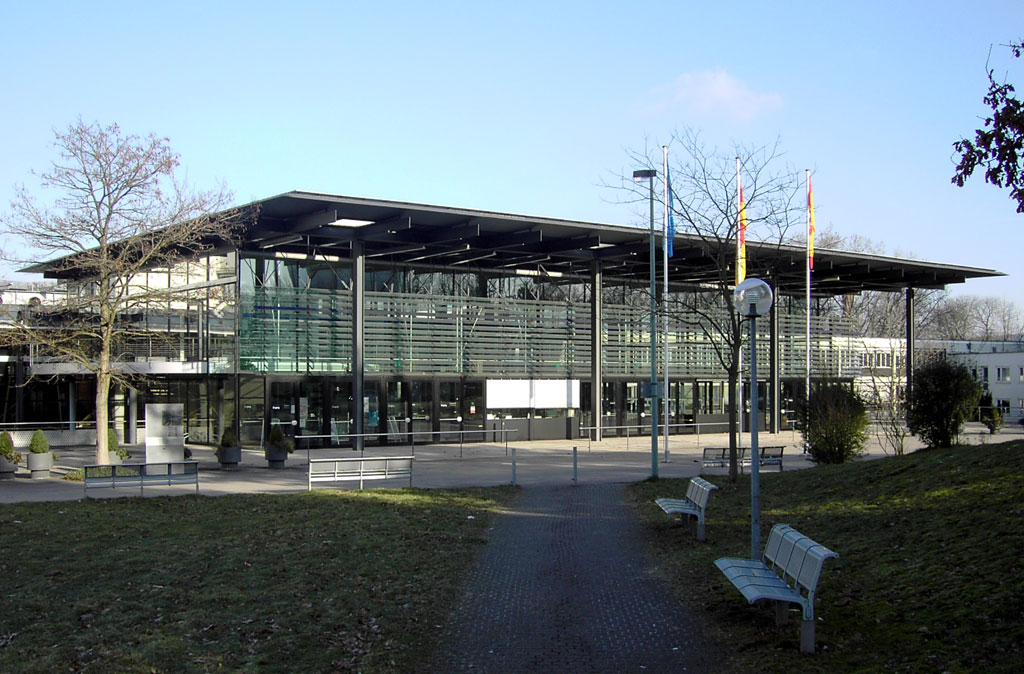
Plenary chamber of the German Bundestag in Bonn

== Main works (selection) ==
- 1967–72: Olympic Park in Munich, Germany
- 1984–87: Central library of the Catholic University of Eichstätt-Ingolstadt, Eichstätt, Germany
- 1984–90: Museum für Kommunikation Frankfurt, Germany
- 1985–87: HYSOLAR-Building der University of Stuttgart, Germany
- 1987–92: Plenary Complex of the German Parliament (Bundestag) in Bonn, Germany
- 1993–2005: Academy of Arts Building in central Berlin, a six-story glass expansion of the reconstructed Hotel Adlon
- 1997: State Clearing Bank – Landesgirokasse in Stuttgart, Germany
- 1998: Control tower at Nuremberg Airport, Germany
- 1998–2002: North German State Clearing Bank in Hanover, Germany
- 1999: Museum der Phantasie, Bernried am Starnberger See, Germany
- 2003: Genzyme Center in Cambridge, Massachusetts, USA
- 2005: Centre for Cellular and Biomolecular Research in Toronto, Canada

== Bibliography ==
- Busch, Rainer; Röll, Hans-Joachim (1999). German U-boat Commanders of World War II: A Biographical Dictionary. Translated by Brooks, Geoffrey. London, Annapolis, Md: Greenhill Books, Naval Institute Press. ISBN 1-55750-186-6.
