= Leipzig Grünauer Allee station =

Railway station in Leipzig, Saxony, Germany

Leipzig Grünauer Allee
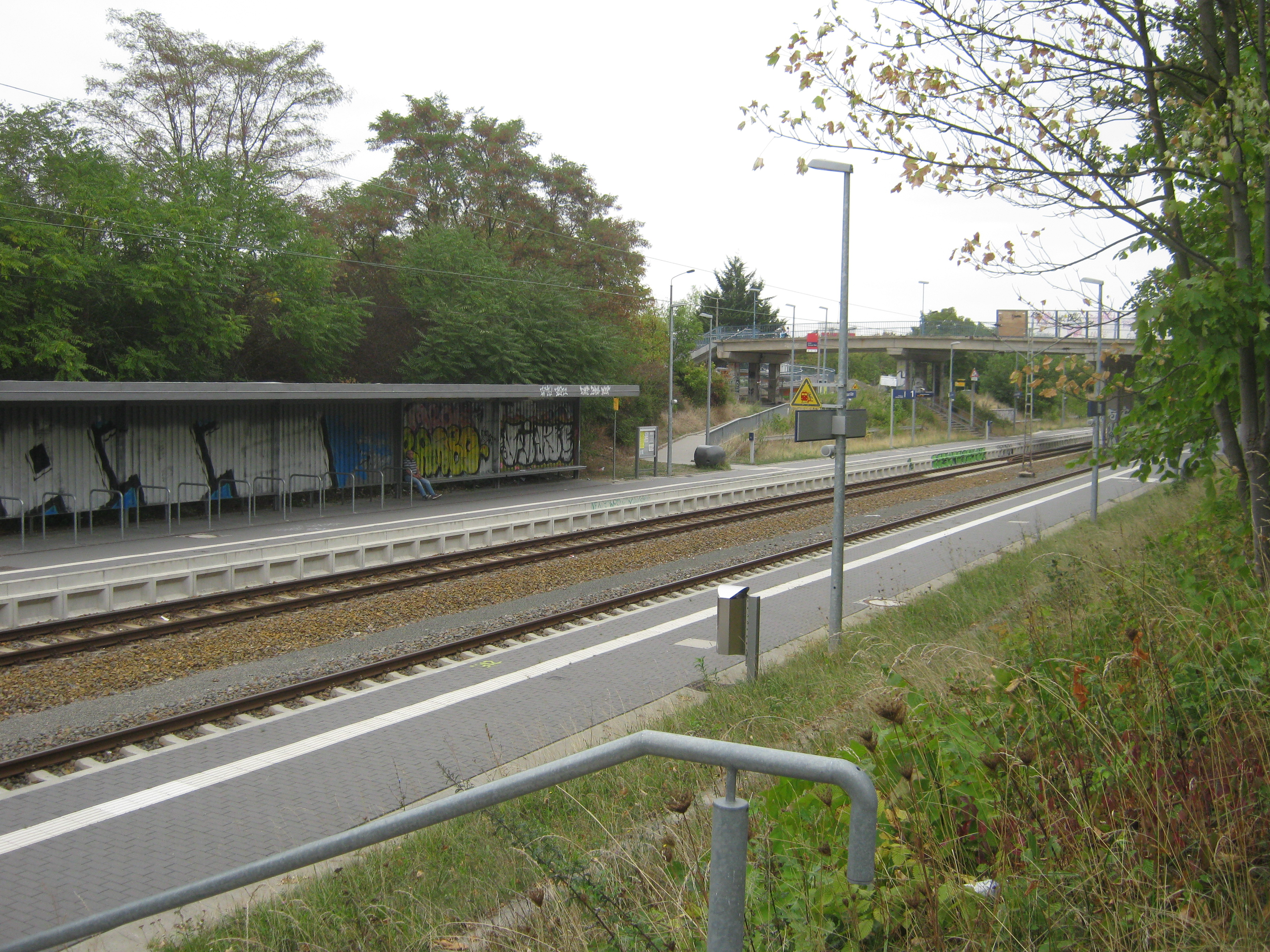
- Leipzig Grünauer Allee station in 2018

General information
- Location: Leipzig, Saxony; Germany
- Coordinates: 51.3208962°N 12.303072°E
- Line: Plagwitz–Miltitzer Allee
- Platforms: 2

Other information
- Station code: 2386
- DS100 code: LGRA
- Category: 6
- Fare zone: MDV: 110

History
- Opened: 19 September 1977; 48 years ago
- Electrified: at opening

Services
| Preceding station | Mitteldeutschland S-Bahn | Following station |
|---|---|---|
| Leipzig Allee-Center towards Leipzig Miltitzer Allee | S 1 | Leipzig-Plagwitz towards Leipzig-Stötteritz |
Location

Leipzig Grünauer Allee (German: Haltepunkt Leipzig Grünauer Allee) is a railway station located in Leipzig, Germany. The station opened on 25 September 1977 and was closed between April 2011 and 15 December 2013. The station is located on the Leipzig-Plagwitz–Leipzig Miltitzer Allee railway. The train services are operated by Deutsche Bahn, as part of the S-Bahn Mitteldeutschland.
