= Leipzig Allee-Center station =

Railway stop in Leipzig, Germany

Leipzig Allee-Center
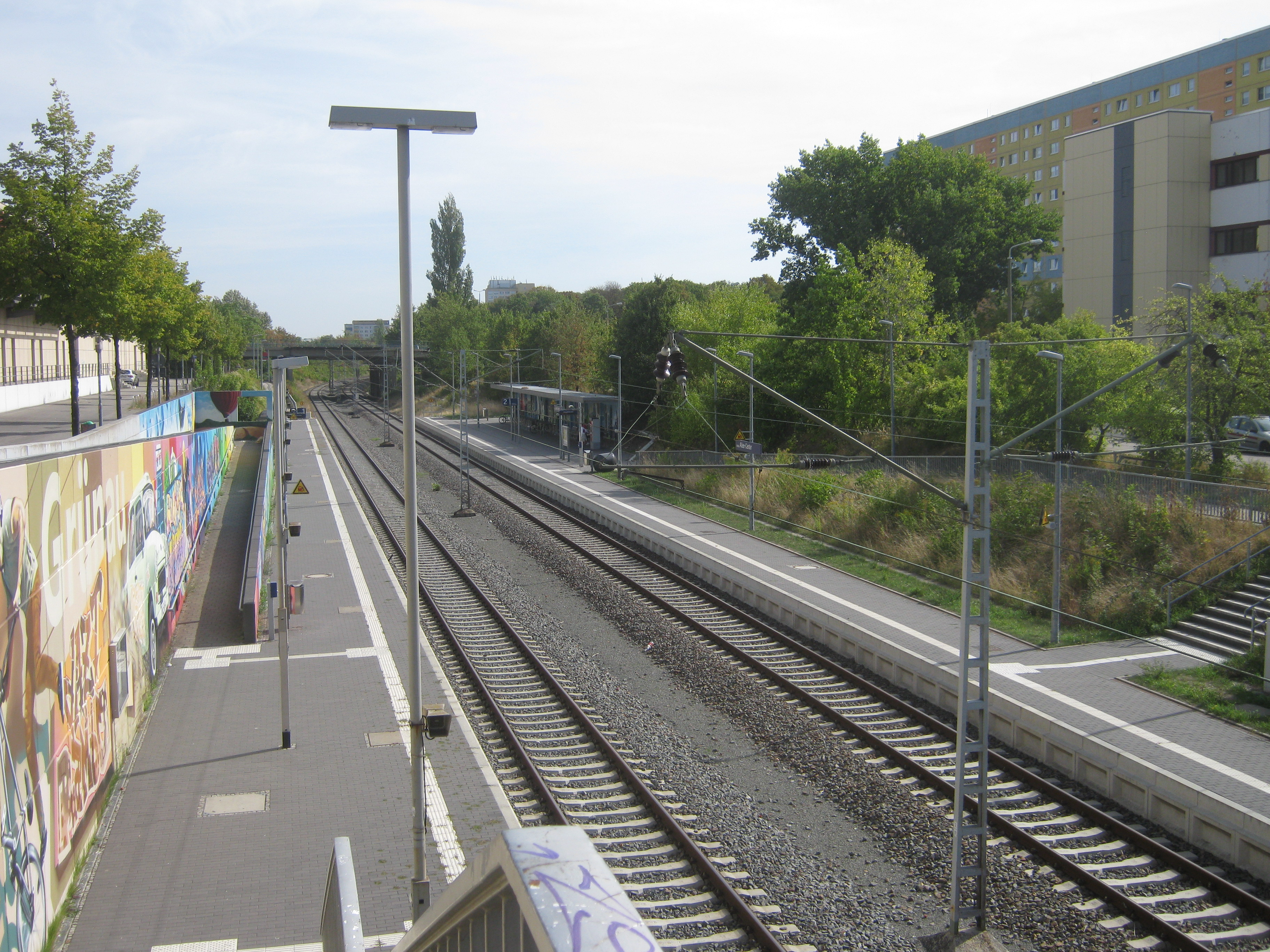
- Leipzig Allee-Center station in 2018

General information
- Location: Leipzig, Saxony; Germany
- Coordinates: 51.3191°N 12.2919°E
- Line: Plagwitz–Miltitzer Allee
- Platforms: 2

Other information
- Station code: 6091
- DS100 code: LSTG
- Category: 6
- Fare zone: MDV: 110

History
- Opened: 18 December 1980; 45 years ago
- Electrified: at opening
- Former names: 1980-1991 Leipzig Wilhelm-Pieck-Allee; 1991-2002 Leipzig Stuttgarter Allee

Services
Preceding station	Mitteldeutschland S-Bahn	Following station
Leipzig Karlsruher Straße towards Leipzig Miltitzer Allee	S 1	Leipzig Grünauer Allee towards Leipzig-Stötteritz
Location

Leipzig Allee-Center (German: Haltepunkt Leipzig Allee-Center) is a railway station located in Leipzig, Germany. The station opened in December 1980 and was closed between April 2011 and 15 December 2013. The station is located on the Leipzig-Plagwitz–Leipzig Miltitzer Allee railway. The train services are operated by Deutsche Bahn, as part of the S-Bahn Mitteldeutschland.
