= Behnisch Architekten =

Practice information
- Firm type: Architectural practice
- Partners: Stefan Behnisch, Robert Hoesle, Robert Matthew Noblett, Stefan Rappold, Kristi Paulson and Jörg Usinger
- Founders: Stefan Behnisch
- Founded: 1989
- Location: Stuttgart

Significant works and honors
- Buildings: Landesgirokasse am Bollwerk
- Projects: Administration building for the LVA-Landesversicherungsanstalt
- Design: Bayrische Vereinsbank

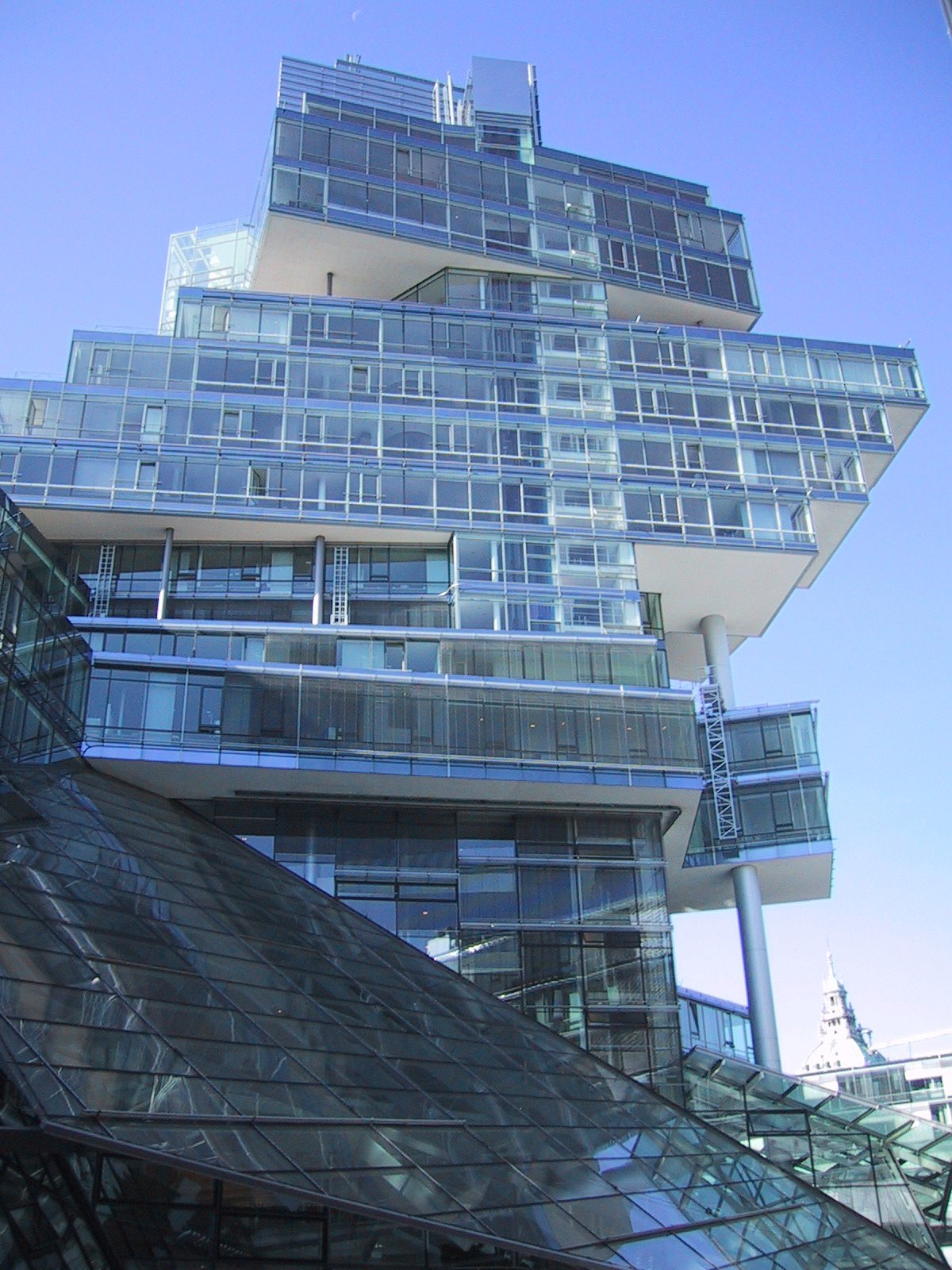
Norddeutsche Landesbank head office building in Hanover

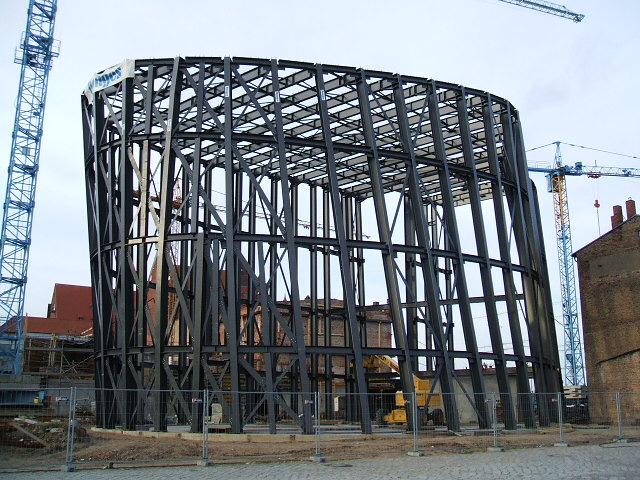
Construction site of the Oceaneum in Stralsund

Behnisch Architekten is an architectural practice based in Stuttgart, Germany, with branches in Munich, Germany; Boston, Massachusetts and Los Angeles, California.

The office was founded in 1989 by Stefan Behnisch, son of the well-known German architect Günter Behnisch. Among the works from Günter Behnisch are the stadium for the 1972 Summer Olympics in Munich (1967–1972), the German parliament in Bonn and the Academy of Arts in Berlin. In 2005, after several changes in structure and name, the independent Stadtbüro adopted today`s name, Behnisch Architekten. Under Stefan Behnisch's leadership, the firm has developed over the last more than 25 years into a successful international practice with offices in Stuttgart (since 1991), Los Angeles (1999–2011), Boston (since 2006), and Munich (since 2009). The Los Angeles office reopened under the leadership of Kristi Paulson in 2019. All four firms operate under the name of Behnisch Architekten.

The offices are managed by the firm partners, Stefan Behnisch, Robert Hoesle, Robert Matthew Noblett, Stefan Rappold, Kristi Paulson and Jörg Usinger. In the firm's rich history, former partners include Günter Behnisch, Winfried Büxel, David Cook, Martin Haas, Christof Jantzen, Manfred Sabatke, Günther Schaller and Erhard Tränkner.

== Projects ==
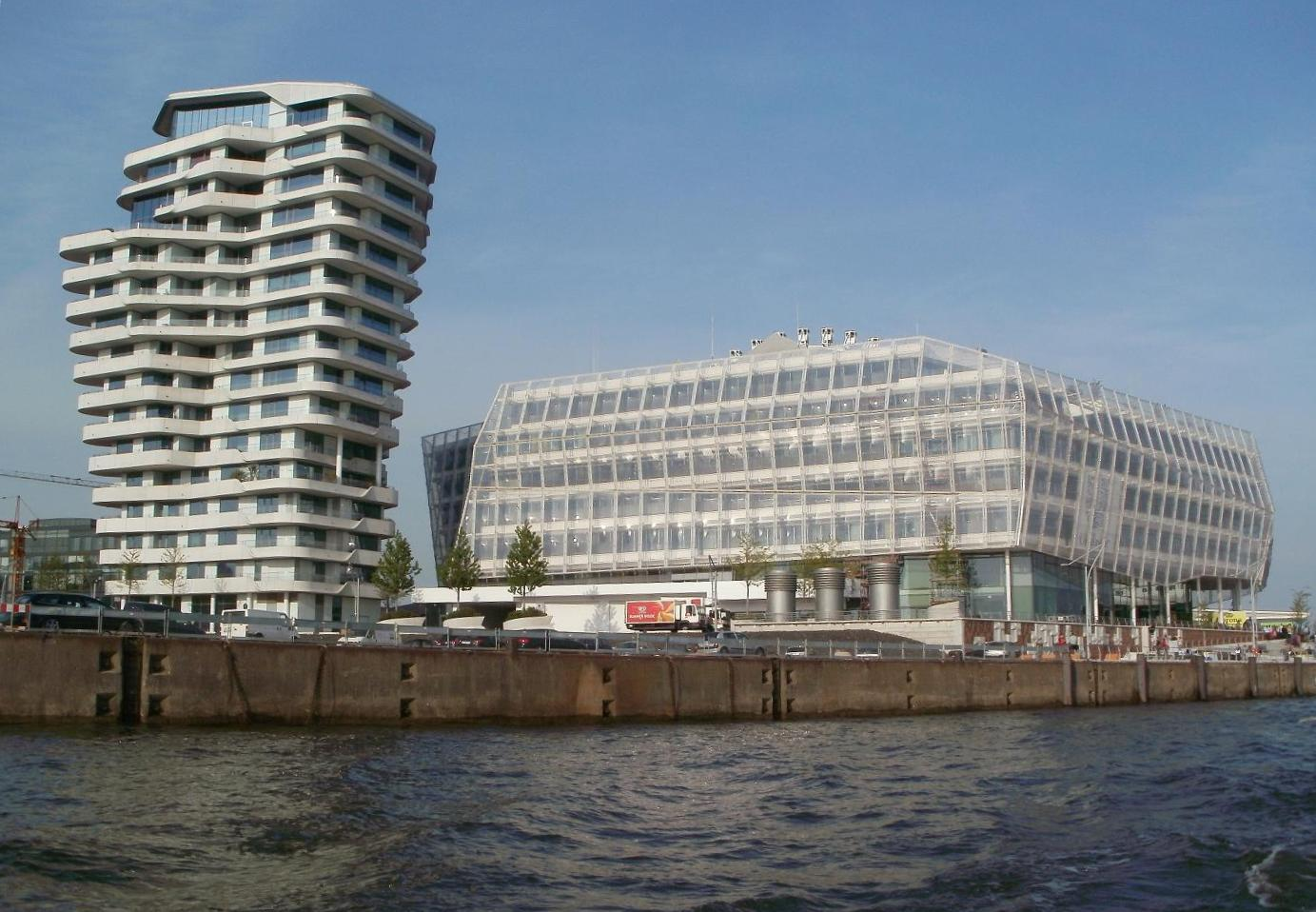
Marco-Polo-Tower and Unilver-Building in Hamburg-Hafencity, Germany

=== Finished (selected projects) ===
- 1997 Landesgirokasse am Bollwerk, Stuttgart, Germany
- 1997 Administration building for the LVA-Landesversicherungsanstalt, Lübeck, Germany
- 1996 Bayrische Vereinsbank, Stuttgart, Germany
- 1996 Catholic St. Benno-grammar school, Dresden, Germany
- 1998 IBN-Institute for Forestry and Nature Research, Wageningen, Netherlands
- 1999 Swimming Pool Complex Grünauer Welle, Leipzig, Germany
- 2001 Museum der Phantasie – Lothar-Günther-Buchheim-Collection, Bernried am Starnberger See, Germany
- 2002 Norddeutsche Landesbank am Friedrichswall, Hanover, Germany
- 2002 Technology Building for the University Ilmenau, Ilmenau, Germany
- 2003 Entory Home, Ettlingen, Germany
- 2004 Headquarter Genzyme Center, Cambridge, Massachusetts, USA
- 2004 Pistorius-School, Herbrechtingen, Germany
- 2005 Terrence Donnelly Centre for Cellular and Biomolecular Research (with architectsAlliance), Toronto, Canada
- 2007 Spa Baths Bad Aibling, Bad Aibling, Germany
- 2007 Haus im Haus for the Chamber of Commerce Hamburg, Hamburg, Germany
- 2007 Hilde-Domin-School, Herrenberg, Germany
- 2007 Werner-von-Linde-Halle, Munich
- 2007 Römerbad, Spa Bath in Bad Kleinkirchheim, Austria
- 2008 Ozeaneum – German Oceanographic Museum, Stralsund, Germany
- 2008 Kovner Residence, Sebastopol, California, USA
- 2009 Unilever Headquarters Germany, Austria and Switzerland, Hamburg, Germany
- 2010 Marco-Polo-Tower, Hamburg, Germany
- 2010 NCT-National Centre for Tumour Diseases, Heidelberg, Germany
- 2010 Park Street Building (with Svigals + Partners, LLP, New Haven), Yale, New Haven, Connecticut, USA
- 2010 Quest Forum 'An der Alten Spinnerei', Kolbermoor, Germany
- 2010 Refurbishment, Modernization and Extension of the Hysolar Building (with H III S, Harder Stumpfl Schramm), Stuttgart, Germany
- 2011 WIPO Administration Building – World Intellectual Property Organization, Geneva, Switzerland
- 2011 Speed Skating Stadium Inzell – Max Aicher Arena (with Pohl Architekten), Inzell, Germany
- 2011 Loft Houses, Kolbermoor, Germany
- 2012 Maximino Martinez Commons, University of California Student Apartments, Berkeley, California, USA
- 2012 City Hall Kolbermoor with Library and Education Center, Kolbermoor, Germany
- 2012 Children's Daycare Center on Schwetzinger Terrasse, Heidelberg, Germany
- 2012 Digiteolabs, Saclay, Moulon, Palaiseau, France; in cooperation with BRS architectes
- 2012 Schlaues Haus, Oldenburg, Germany
- 2013 John and Frances Angelos Law Center (with Ayers/Saint/Gross), University of Baltimore School of Law, Maryland, USA
- 2013 City of Santa Monica Public Parking Structure #6 (with Studio Jantzen and IPD), Santa Monica, California, USA
- 2013 City Hall Bad Aibling, Germany
- 2013 Refurbishment of office spaces at Breuninger Headquarter. Stuttgart, Germany
- 2013 Secondary School Ergolding (ARGE Behnisch Architekten | ALN), Germany
- 2013 Habitation at the Rosengarten, Kolbermoor, Germany
- 2014 WTO Security Parameter – World Trade Organization, Geneva, Switzerland
- 2014 WIPO Conference Hall – World Intellectual Property Organization, Geneva, Switzerland
- 2014 Haus S, Stuttgart, Germany
- 2014 Refurbishment Sports Hall Lorch (designed by Behnisch & Partner 1975), Germany
- 2015 Extension Spa Baths Bad Aibling, Germany
- 2015 Capitol Rosenheim, Germany
- 2015 Glaspalast Sindelfingen (designed by Behnisch & Partner 1976) – Refurbishment and Technical Upgrade, Sindelfingen, Germany
- 2017 The Metropolitan Andrey Sheptytsky Center, Ukrainian Catholic University, Lviv, Ukraine

=== Current (selected projects) ===
- Harvard's Allston Science and Engineering Complex, Allston, Massachusetts, USA
- Habitation Langwasser, Nuremberg, Germany
- Waldorfschule Uhlandshöhe, Stuttgart, Germany
- Lurup Neighborhood School, Hamburg, Germany
- Further Development of the School Area Bernhausen, Germany
- Paul-Winter Middle School (ARGE Behnisch Architekten | ALN), Neuburg, Germany
- Lycée Franco-allemand, Buc, France
- Habitation at the Spinnereipark, Kolbermoor, Germany
- City Hall Großkarolinenfeld, Germany
- City Hall Gröbenzell, Germany
- Schwaketenbad, Constance, Germany
- Ludwig-Weber School, Frankfurt, Germany
- Health and Fitness Spa, Friedrichshafen, Germany
- adidas 'World Of Sports' ARENA, Herzogenaurach, Germany
- Langsdale Library (renovation), University of Baltimore, Maryland, USA
- Artists For Humanity EpiCenter (expansion), Boston, Massachusetts, USA
- Dorotheen Quartier, Stuttgart, Germany
- AGORA Cancer Research Center, Lausanne, Switzerland
- School of Business Administration, Portland State University, Portland, Oregon, USA

== Awards ==
- 2007: Global Award for Sustainable Architecture (first edition)

== Books ==
- Behnisch, Behnisch & Partner. Bauten und Entwürfe. Birkhäuser Verlag, Basel 2003, ISBN 3-7643-6931-0
- Genzyme Center. fmo publishers, Stuttgart 2004, ISBN 3-937934-00-6
- NORD/LB Hannover. Hatje Cantz, Stuttgart 2002, ISBN 3-7757-1231-3
- Architecture for Nature. IBN-DLO Wageningen. Schuyt & Co., Haarlem 1998, ISBN 90-6097-472-7
- Behnisch Architekten Magazine 01. fmo publishers, Stuttgart 2013, ISBN 978-3-937934-05-1
- Behnisch Architekten Magazine 02. fmo publishers, Stuttgart 2014, ISBN 978-3-937934-07-5
