= Leipzig-Plagwitz station =

Railway station in Leipzig, Germany

Leipzig Plagwitz
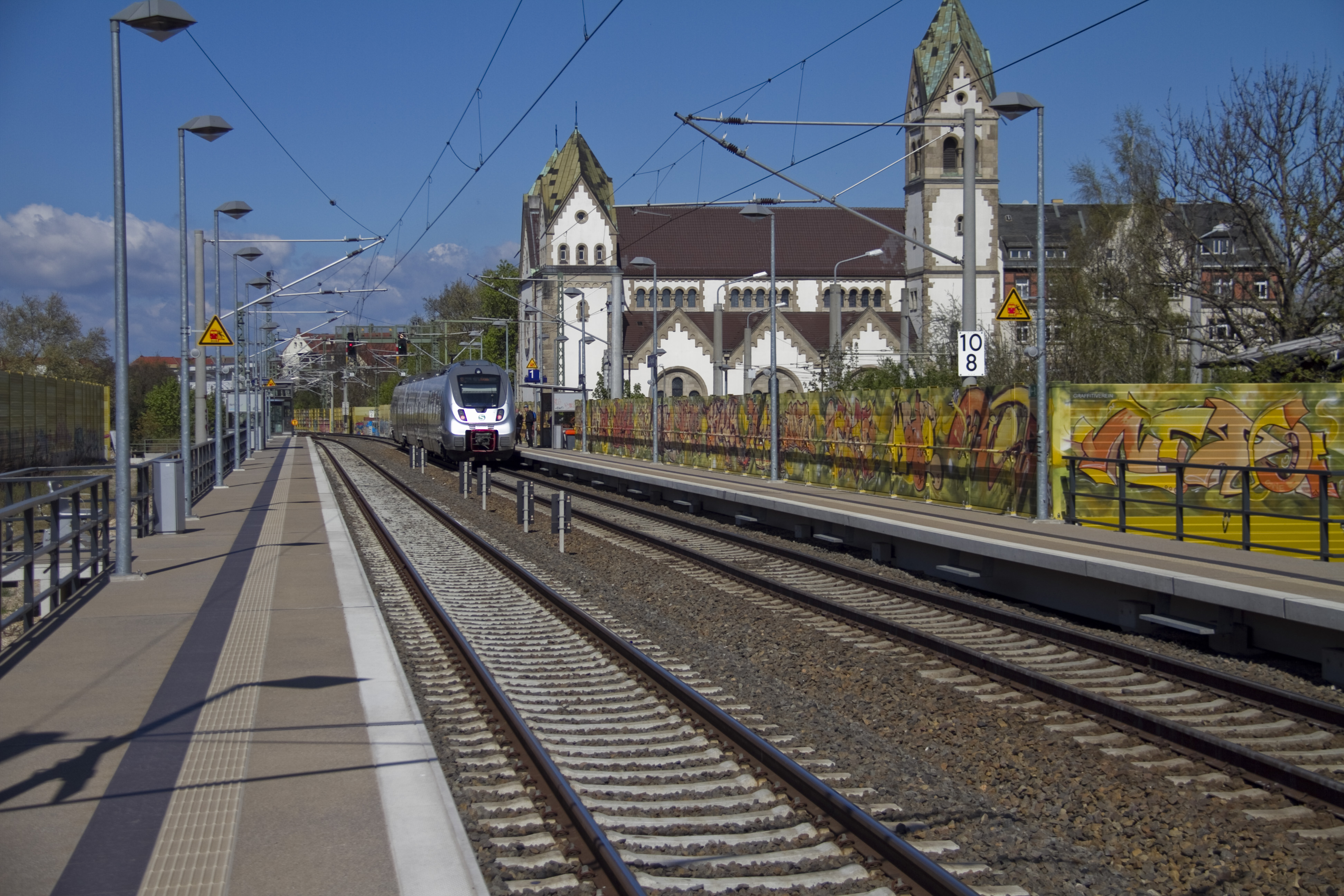
- Leipzig-Plagwitz station with an S-Bahn train in 2014

General information
- Location: Leipzig, Saxony; Germany
- Coordinates: 51.1941°N 12.1921°E
- Lines: Leipzig–Probstzella; Leipzig–Markkleeberg; Plagwitz–Miltitzer Allee
- Platforms: 2

Other information
- Station code: n/a
- DS100 code: LLP
- Category: 5
- Fare zone: MDV: 110
- Website: www.bahnhof.de

History
- Opened: 20 October 1873; 152 years ago
- Electrified: 26 May 1963; 63 years ago
- Former names: 1873-1920 Plagwitz-Lindenau Preuß[ischer] St[aats]b[ahnhof] 1920-1922 Plagwitz-Lindenau

Services
Preceding station		Following station
Leipzig-Knauthain towards Saalfeld (Saale)	RE 12	Leipzig Hbf Terminus
Leipzig-Knauthain towards Saalfeld (Saale)	RB 22	Leipzig-Möckern towards Leipzig Hbf
Preceding station	Mitteldeutschland S-Bahn	Following station
Leipzig Grünauer Allee towards Leipzig Miltitzer Allee	S 1	Leipzig-Lindenau towards Leipzig-Stötteritz
Location
- Location within Saxony Location within Germany Location within Europe

Leipzig-Plagwitz (German: Bahnhof Leipzig-Plagwitz) is a railway station located in Leipzig, Germany. The station opened on 20 October 1873. The station is located on the Leipzig–Probstzella railway, Leipzig-Plagwitz–Markkleeberg-Gaschwitz railway and Leipzig-Plagwitz–Leipzig Miltitzer Allee railway. The train services are operated by Deutsche Bahn and Erfurter Bahn. Since December 2013 the station is served by the S-Bahn Mitteldeutschland. As part of this, the platforms in Leipzig-Plagwitz had been moved directly north to Karl-Heine-Straße and received new entrances.

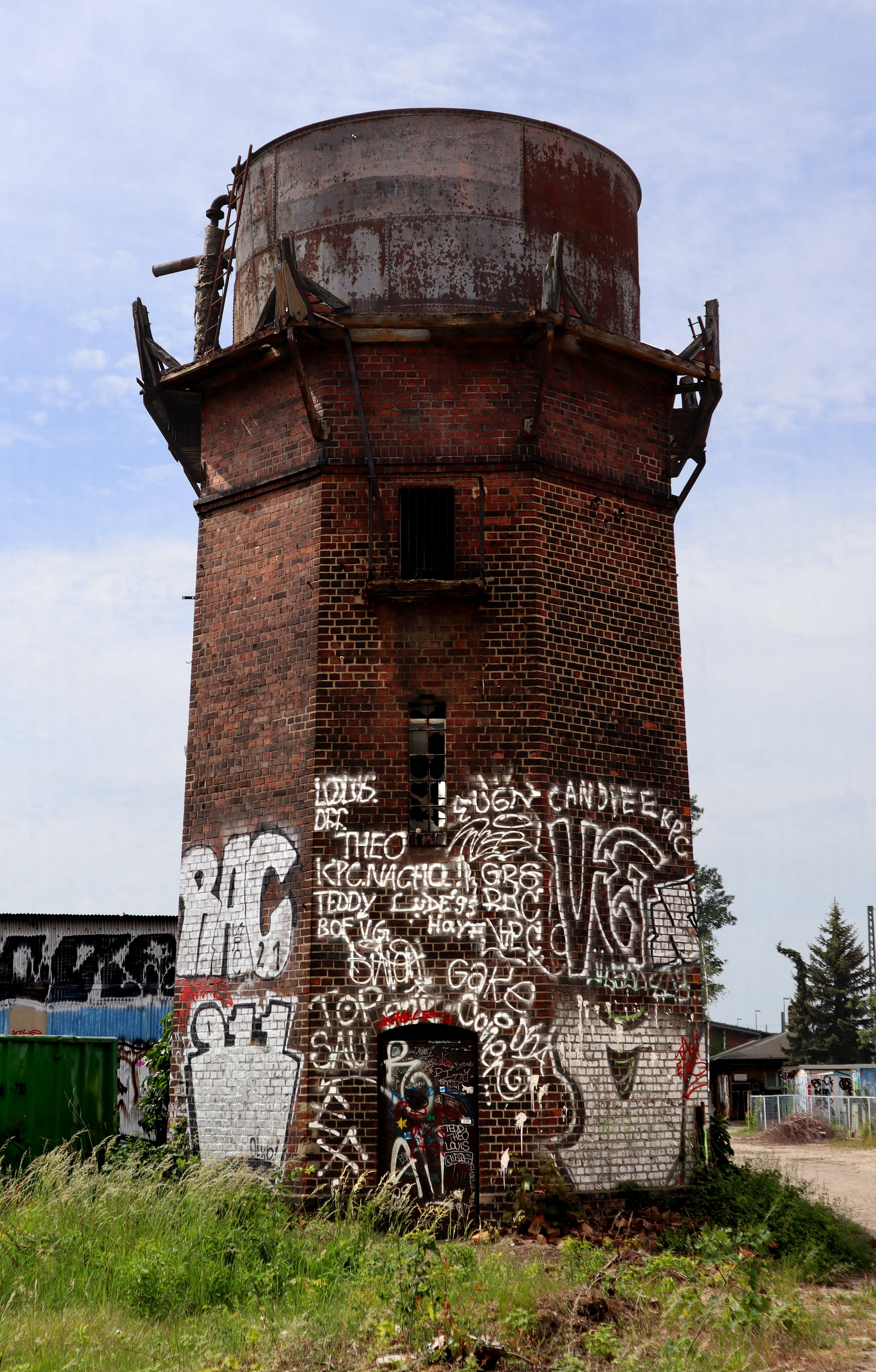
Former water tower (1897), Cultural heritage monument
