= Christof Jantzen =

American architect

Christof Jantzen is an architect based in Los Angeles, California. Throughout his professional career Jantzen has directed and designed various sustainably designed projects. Many have received international recognition for leadership in global green design including the Santa Monica Parking Structure #6, the Genzyme Corporate Headquarters, Mill Street Lofts, Los Angeles and the Harvard Allston Science Complex. Other recognition of Jantzens's work includes the Leadership in Energy and Environmental Design (LEED) Platinum Award, AIA/COTE Top Ten Green Project Award, California Green Leadership Award, Northeast Sustainable Energy Association Award, American Architecture Award... Jantzen was the founding partner of Behnisch Architekten LLP in the United States. He is a professor at Washington University in St. Louis Center for the Environment. Jantzen taught design at the Southern California Institute of Architecture, California State Polytechnic University and the University of Southern California. He is the principal and owner of the Venice, California -based architectural practice Studio Jantzen.

== Buildings & projects ==
- Santa Monica Parking Structure #6, Santa Monica, CA
- Anna Head Student Housing Complex, UC Berkeley, CA
- Genzyme Corporate Headquarters, Cambridge, MA
- Park Street Laboratory Building, Yale University, New Haven, CT
- Harvard Allston Science Complex, Harvard University, Boston, MA
- Mill Street Lofts, Los Angeles, CA
- The House of the Future, Illinois Institute of Technology, Chicago, IL
- French Lofts, Los Angeles, CA
- Mineral Bath Extension & Renovation, Bad Elster, Germany
- Lower Donlands Urban Estuary, Toronto, ON
- The Hearn Power Station Regeneration Project, Toronto, ON
- Retrofit of The Daley Center Chicago in Cooperation with Chicago Mayor Richard M. Daley
- CityArchRiver St. Louis
- Innovative Container Residence
- Deming Place Chicago
- Kelly Pool House Brentwood, CA
- CTCSE Connecticut Center for Science & Exploration, USA-Hartford
- Artcenter Passedena
- Re:Vision Dallas Central Dallas Community Development Corporation (CDCDC), TX

== Academics ==
- Professor at Washington University in St. Louis
- Taught design at Southern California Institute of Architecture
- Taught design at California State Polytechnic University
- Taught at University of Southern California
- Assistant Professor for Design at University of Stuttgart
- Lectured at Auburn University's Rural Design Studio in Alabama
- Lectured at Cornell University
- Lectured at University of Utah College of Architecture and Planning
