= Grünauer Welle =

Swimming venue in Leipzig, Germany

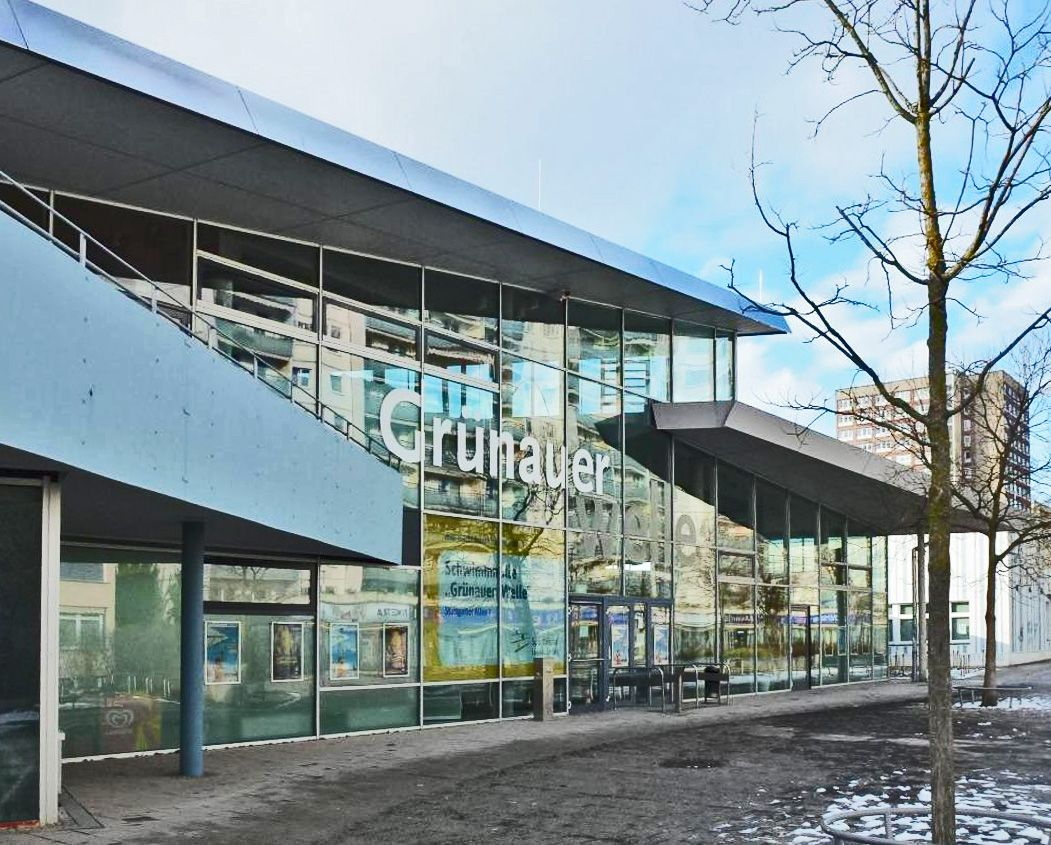
- Interactive map of Grünauer Welle
- Full name: Grünauer Welle
- Address: Leipzig, Germany
- Coordinates: 51°18′54″N 12°17′30″E
- Pool size: Length: 25 m (82 ft)

Construction
- Opened: 20 March 1999
- Cost: DM 25 million
- Architect: Behnisch Architekten

The Grünauer Welle (lit.: Grünau wave) is an indoor sports and leisure pool in the Leipzig quarter of Grünau that opened in 1999.

== Position ==
The Grünauer Welle is centrally located in the southern part of the Grünau-Mitte locality on Stuttgarter Allee, about 200 m (656 ft) before it meets Ratzelstrasse. In the vicinity there are schools as well as sports and leisure facilities, surrounded by prefabricated residential buildings. Although located in a pedestrian zone, the facility is easily accessible by public transport (bus 65, trams 1 and 2, S-Bahn S1), which benefits its regional importance.

== History ==
There had been plans to build such an indoor swimming pool as early as the 1970s, but they were repeatedly delayed. After the large Grünau housing estate was built very quickly during the GDR era from 1976 to 1988, a focus after German reunification was on improving the infrastructure. This also included the construction of a leisure pool.

In 1996, an architectural competition was announced, which was won by the architectural firm Behnisch Architekten. The client was the Sports and Swimming Pool Department of the City of Leipzig (now Sportbäder Leipzig GmbH). Co-financing came from urban development grants (Städtebauförderung). The foundation stone for Behnisch's design was laid in December 1997. Because funding did not flow as planned, the initially planned completion date was postponed. On 20 March 1999, the building was opened as the Grünauer Welle. This was the first municipal indoor swimming pool to be built in Leipzig in 26 years. The information on the construction costs varies between 22 million DM and 25.5 million DM. Sportbäder Leipzig GmbH invested a further 1.125 million EUR in the maintenance and modernization of the Grünauer Welle by 2019.

== Description ==
The floor plan has the shape of a polygon, right angles were omitted in the exterior, and the wooden roof appears to form three washed-up blocks of earth, which means that the building can be attributed to the style of deconstructivism. Because of this contrast to the surrounding prefabricated buildings, the design was deliberately chosen as the winner in the competition.

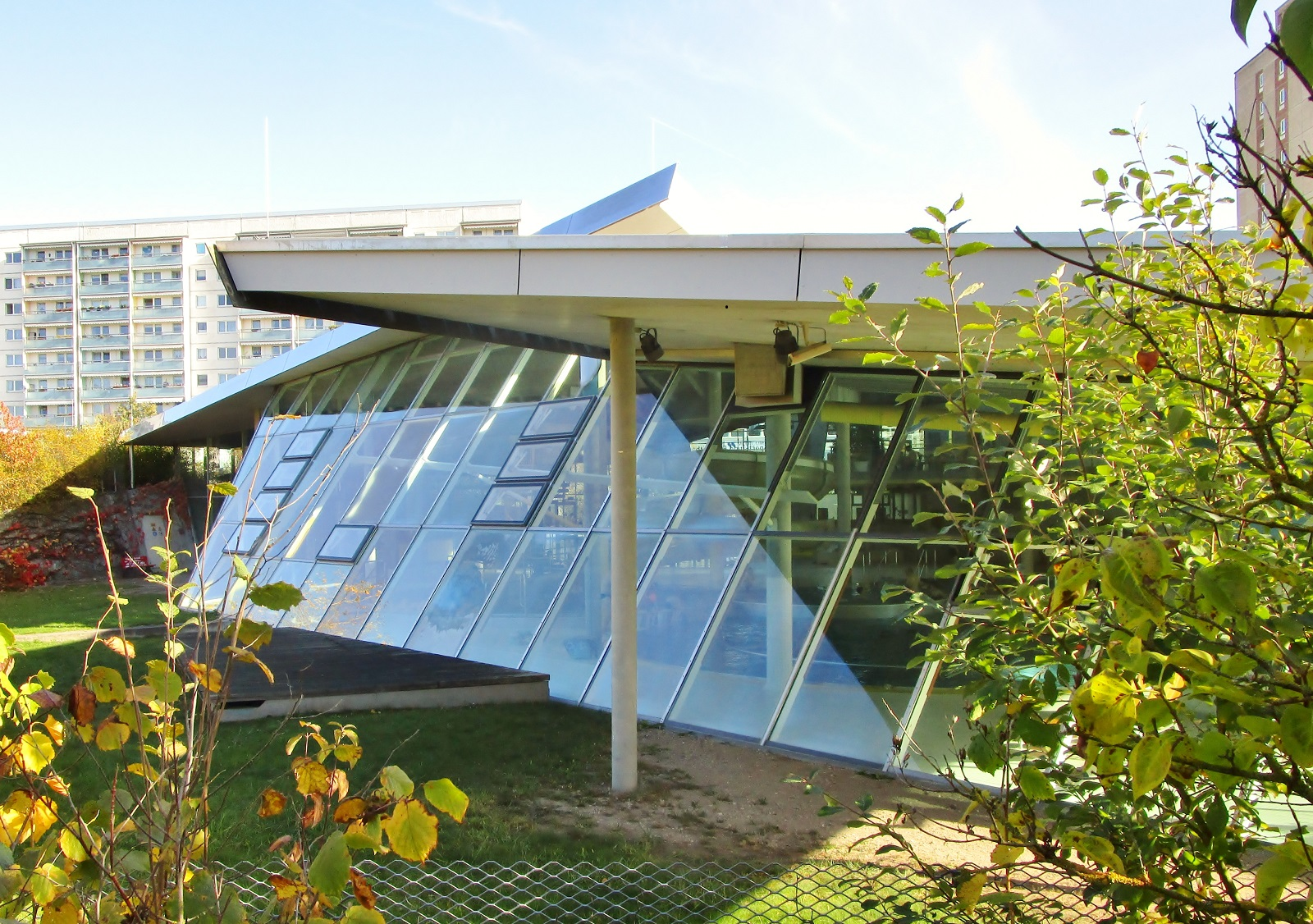
Back of the building

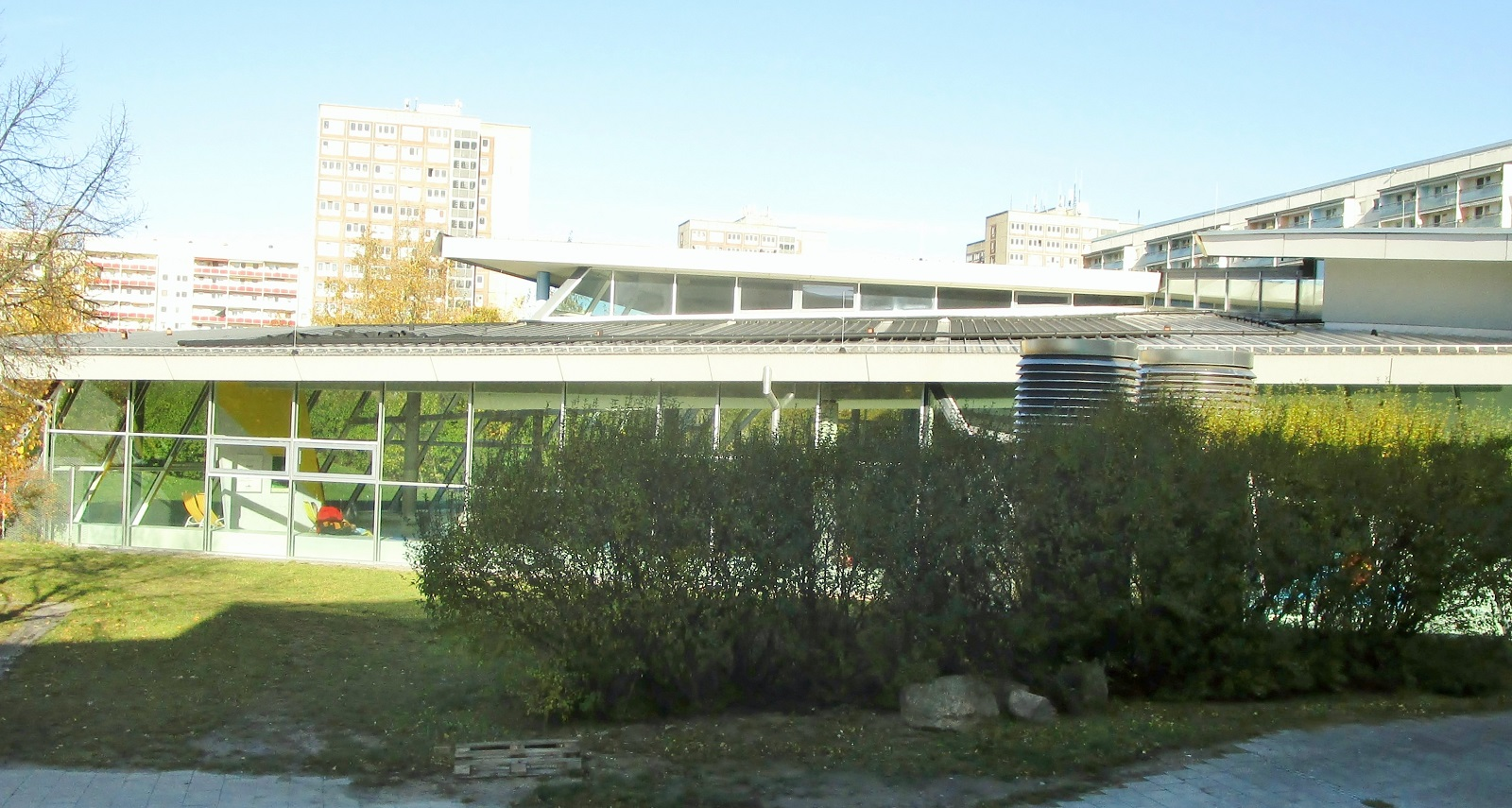
View from the south

The exterior is dominated by reinforced concrete and glass fronts, which is also the case inside. There are solar thermal collectors on the roof. They are used to heat the pool water and thus reduce the need for district heating. At the time of its construction, the Grünauer Welle was considered one of the most modern indoor swimming pools in Europe due to its numerous energy-efficient features.

The pool is designed for 400 visitors and has several pools, all made of stainless steel, with a total water surface of 668 m^{2} (7,190.3 sq ft). There is a 25 m (82 ft) sports pool with 6 lanes and various shallow water pools and a slide in the leisure area separated by a flexible glass wall. A cafeteria can be accessed from both the pool and the outdoor area.

== Bibliography ==
- Lütke Daldrup, Engelbert (1999). Leipzig Bauten / Buildings 1989-1999 (in German and English). Basel / Berlin / Boston: Birkhäuser. pp. 216–219. ISBN 3-7643-5957-9.
- Schwarz, Peter (2015). Das tausendjährige Leipzig. Von den Anfängen bis zum Ende des 18. Jahrhunderts (in German). Leipzig: Pro Leipzig. p. 486. ISBN 978-3-945027-04-2.
- Stadt Leipzig: Hochbauamt der Stadt Leipzig. Geschichte – Aufgaben – Bauvorhaben, Gehrig Verlagsgesellschaft Merseburg o. J. (2000), S. 38f.
