= Leipzig Karlsruher Straße station =

Railway station in Leipzig, Germany

Leipzig Karlsruher Straße
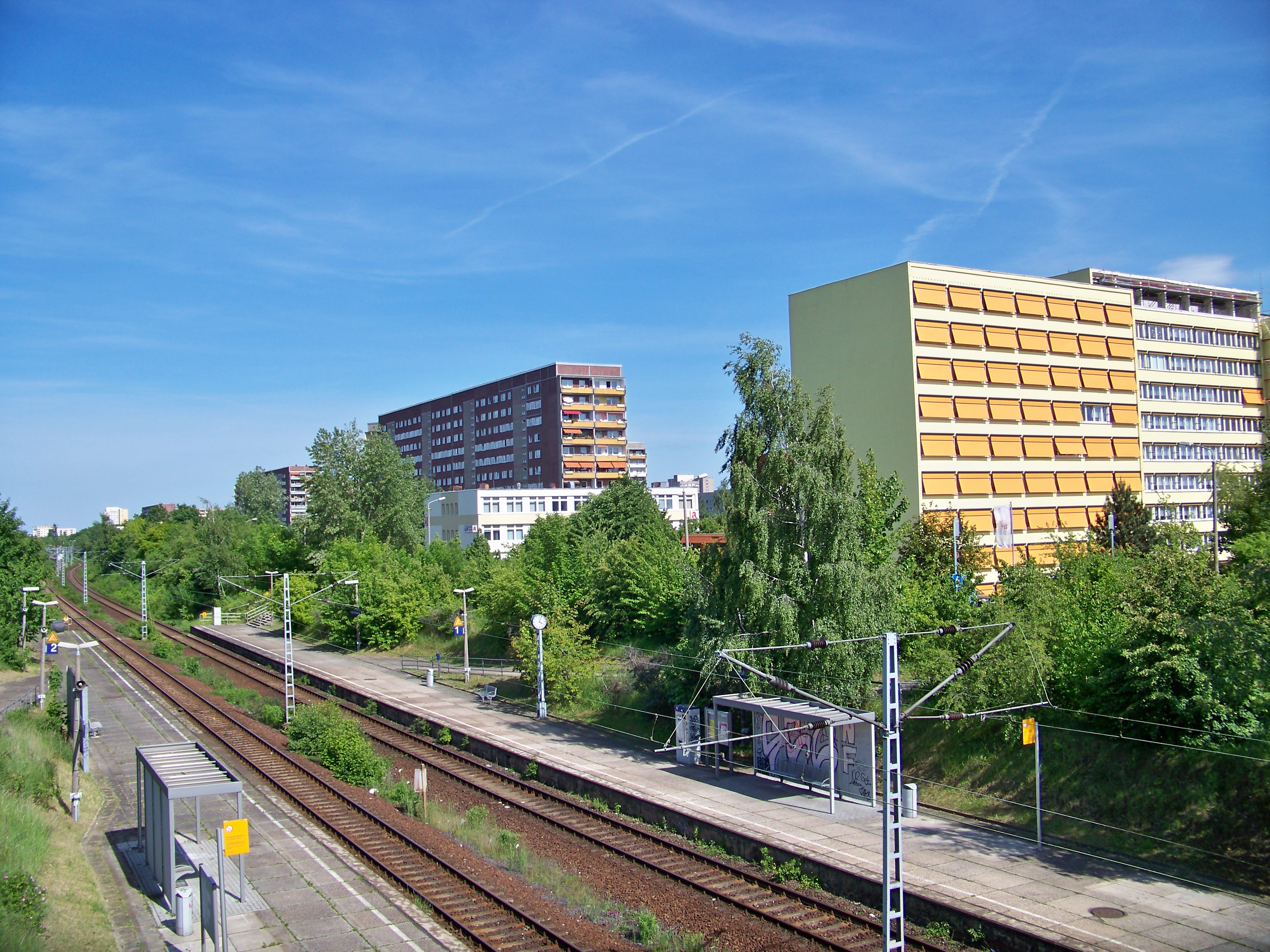
- Leipzig Karlsruher Straße railway station in 2009

General information
- Location: Leipzig, Saxony; Germany
- Coordinates: 51°19′02″N 12°16′45″E
- Line: Plagwitz–Miltitzer Allee
- Platforms: 2

Other information
- Station code: 3113
- DS100 code: LKRS
- Category: 6
- Fare zone: MDV: 110

History
- Opened: 19 December 1983; 42 years ago
- Electrified: at opening
- Former names: 1983-1991 Leipzig Ho-Chi-Minh-Straße

Services
Preceding station	Mitteldeutschland S-Bahn	Following station
Leipzig Miltitzer Allee Terminus	S 1	Leipzig Allee-Center towards Leipzig-Stötteritz
Location

Leipzig Karlsruher Straße (German: Haltepunkt Leipzig Karlsruher Straße) is a railway station located in Leipzig, Germany. The station opened in June 1983 and was closed between April 2011 and 15 December 2013. The station is located on the Leipzig-Plagwitz–Leipzig Miltitzer Allee railway. The train services are operated by Deutsche Bahn, as part of the S-Bahn Mitteldeutschland.
