= Museum der Phantasie =

Museum in Germany

Coordinates: 47°52′21.72″N 11°17′18.53″E

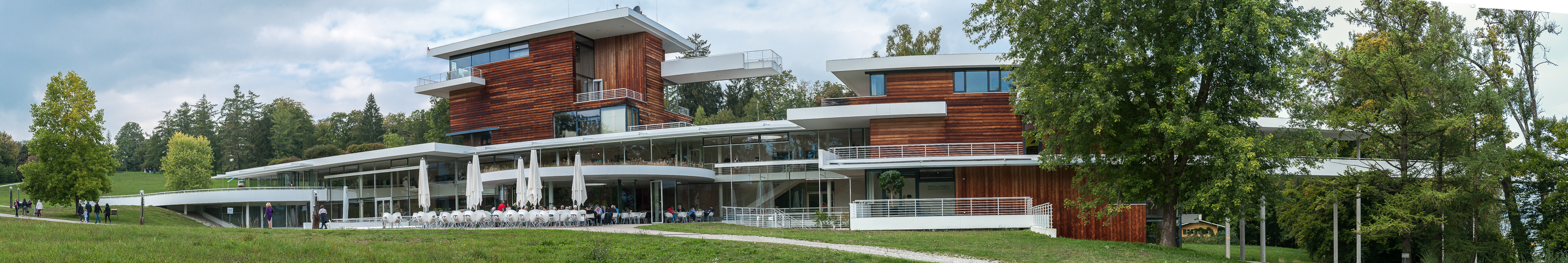
Buchheim-Museum

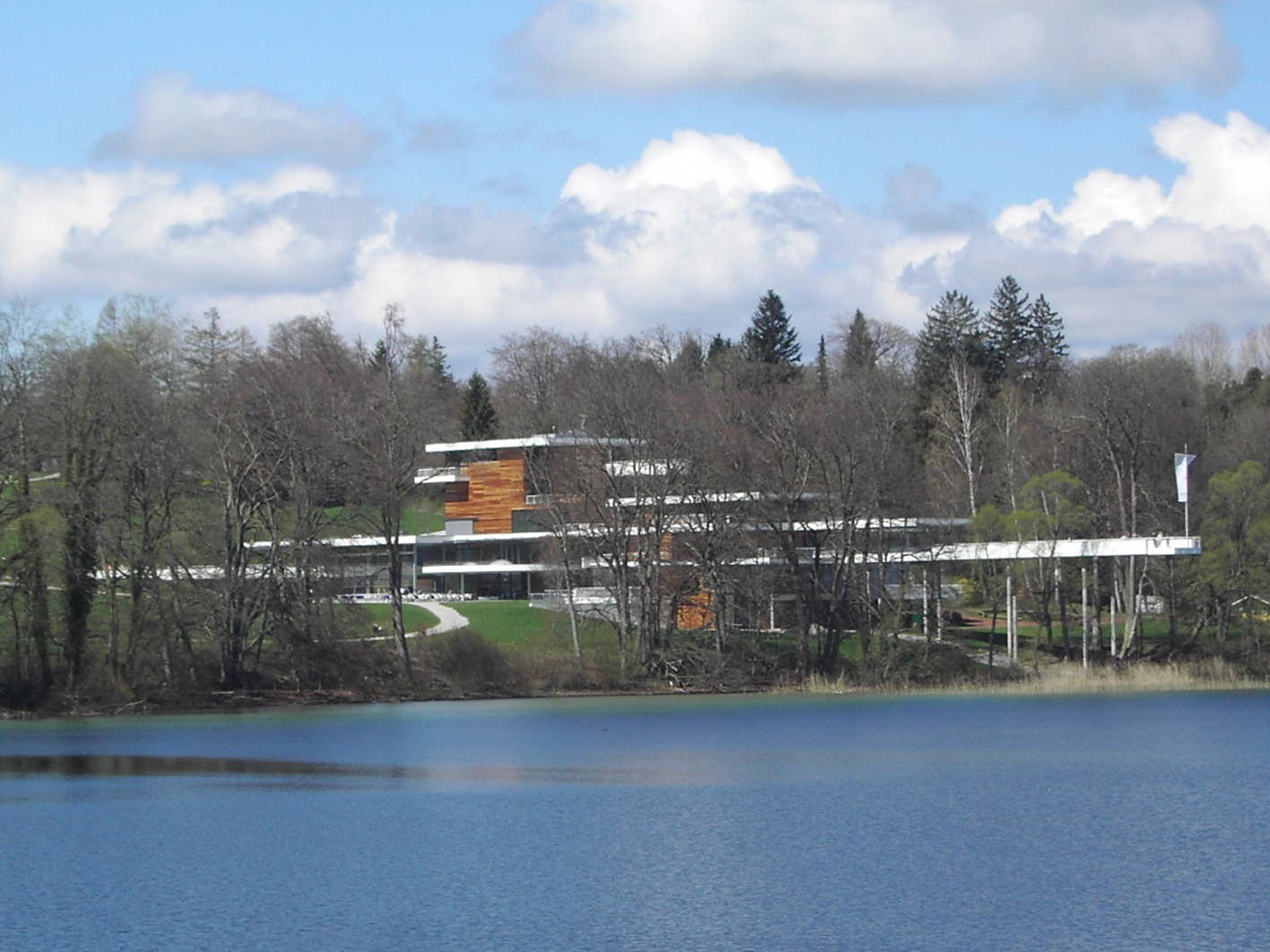
The building includes a balcony that extends directly over the Starnberger See

The Museum der Phantasie (a.k.a. Buchheim-Museum) is a museum in Bernried am Starnberger See. Named after Lothar-Günther Buchheim, whose art collection it holds, it was opened to the public on 23 May 2001. Buchheim is also the author of the best-selling book Das Boot.

The building, designed by the architectural firm Behnisch, Behnisch & Partner, was completed in October 1999. It encompasses around 4,000 square meters and is designed to resemble a ship, with a jetty-like balcony extending out over the Starnberger See. In the surrounding park various sculptures are displayed.

Before the museum was built there were many differences of opinion about the location. Buchheim's requested location in Feldafing, on the grounds of the Villa Maffei, was rejected in a vote by residents.

The museum holds Buchheim's collection of expressionist art, with works by Erich Heckel, Emil Nolde, Ernst Ludwig Kirchner, Max Pechstein, and so forth. It also displays examples of folk art, African art, and Asian art which Buchheim collected during his travels. Paintings and drawings by Buchheim himself are also on display.
