= Leipzig Miltitzer Allee station =

Railway halt in Leipzig, Germany

Leipzig Miltitzer Allee
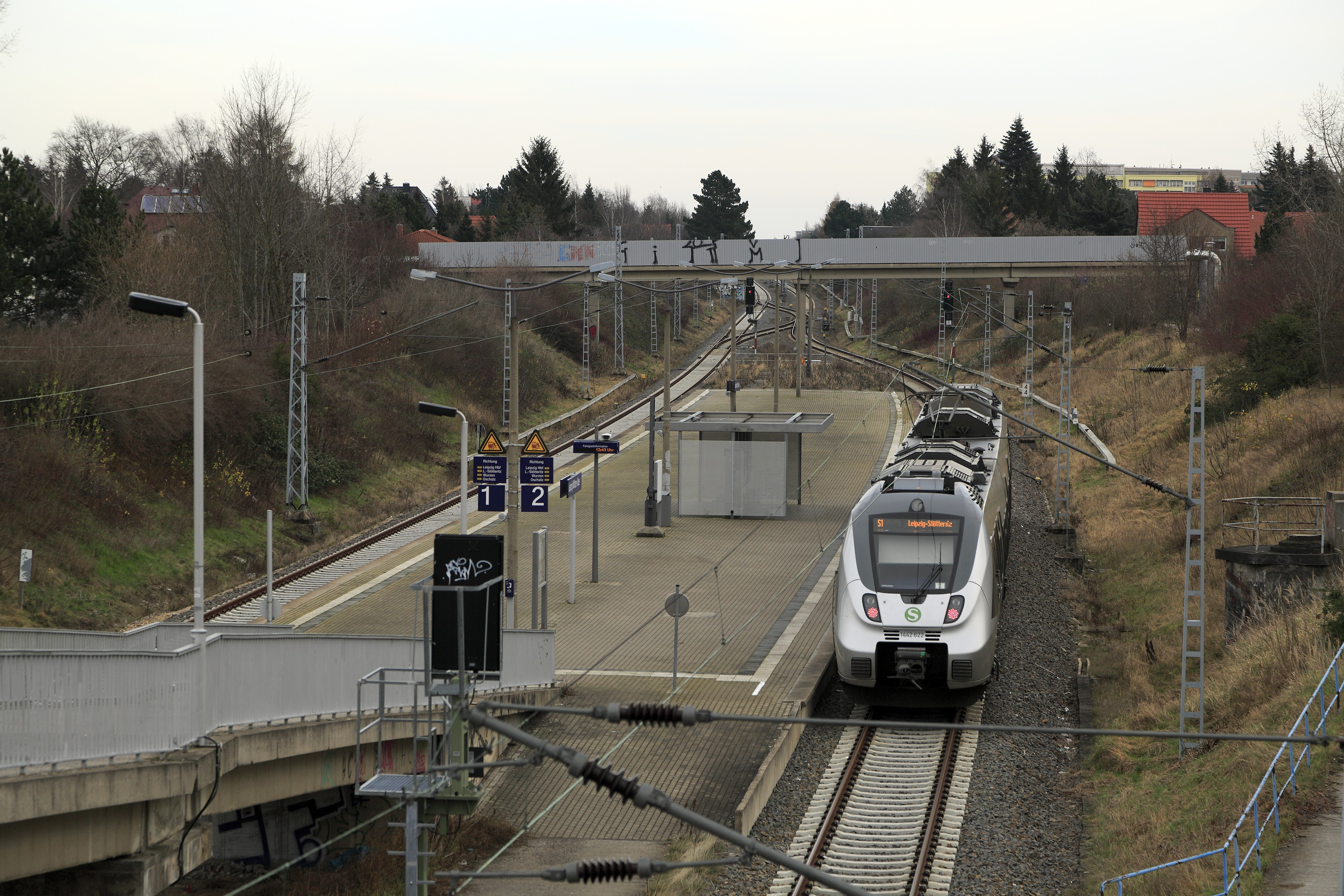
- Leipzig Miltitzer Allee station in 2015

General information
- Location: Leipzig, Saxony; Germany
- Coordinates: 51.3154289°N 12.2681598°E
- Line: Leipzig-Plagwitz–Leipzig Miltitzer Allee
- Platforms: 2

Other information
- Station code: n/a
- DS100 code: LMIA
- Fare zone: MDV: 110

History
- Opened: 19 December 1983; 42 years ago
- Electrified: at opening

Services
Preceding station	Mitteldeutschland S-Bahn	Following station
Terminus	S 1	Leipzig Karlsruher Straße towards Leipzig-Stötteritz
Location

Leipzig Miltitzer Allee (German: Bahnhof Leipzig Miltitzer Allee) is a railway station located in Leipzig, Germany. The station opened in December 1983 and was closed between April 2011 and 15 December 2013. The station is located on the Leipzig-Plagwitz–Leipzig Miltitzer Allee railway. The train services are operated by Deutsche Bahn, as part of the S-Bahn Mitteldeutschland.
