= Leipzig-Plagwitz–Leipzig Miltitzer Allee railway =

Railway line in Germany

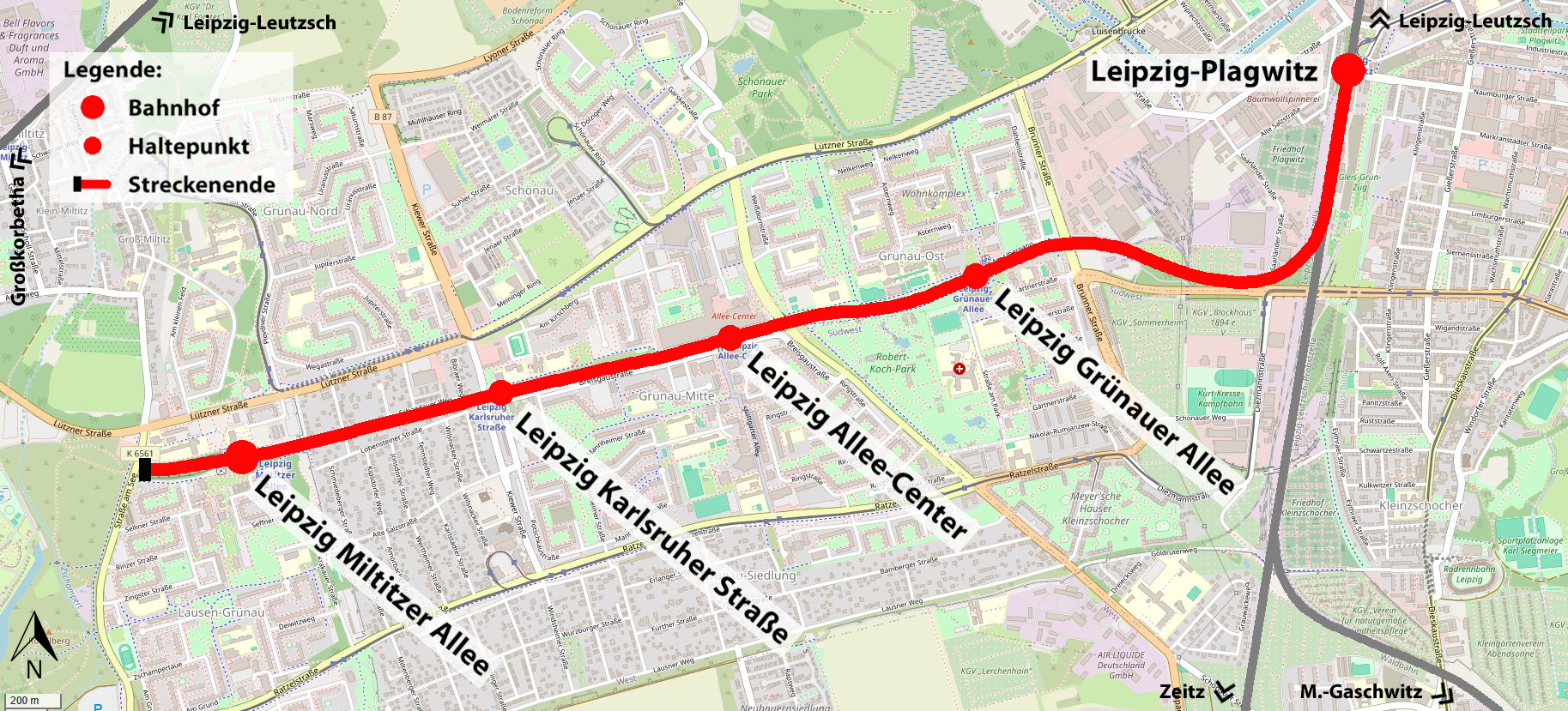

Overview
- Line number: 501.1
- Locale: Saxony, Germany

Service
- Route number: 6052

Technical
- Line length: 4.4 km (2.7 mi)
- Track gauge: 1,435 mm (4 ft 8 1/2 in) standard gauge
- Electrification: 15 kV/16.7 Hz AC catenary

The Leipzig-Plagwitz–Leipzig Miltitzer Allee railway is a two-track electrified main-line in the German state of Saxony. It runs from Leipzig-Plagwitz to Leipzig-Grünau and is integrated into the network of the S-Bahn Mitteldeutschland. However, there were no services on the line from the end of April 2011 until 14 December 2013 due to a reduction in funding for public transport.

== History ==
The line was built from Leipzig-Plagwitz station in four stages from the mid-1970s onwards in accordance with the progressive development of the large residential estate in Leipzig-Grünau. Trains first ran to the halt (Haltepunkt) of Hermann-Matern-Allee (from September 1990: Grünauer Allee) on 25 September 1977. The extension to Wilhelm-Pieck-Allee (later: Stuttgarter Allee, now: Allee-Center) was opened in December 1980 and it was extended to Ho-Chi-Minh-Straße (now: Karlsruher Straße) in June 1983 and finally to Miltitzer Allee in December 1983.

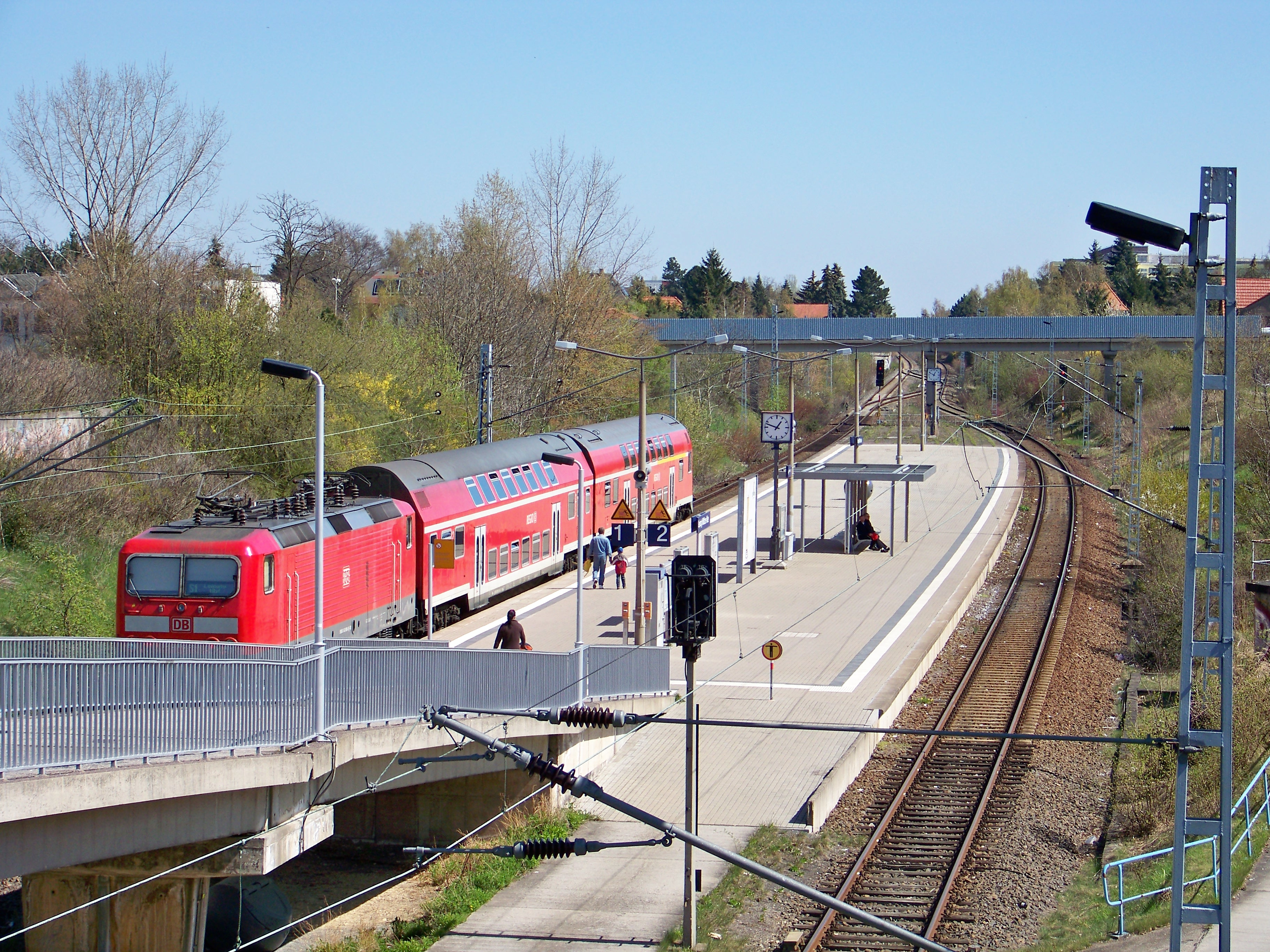
Miltitzer Allee station with train of line S1 (2010)

The route was initially operated as line C of the Leipzig S-Bahn, which originally shuttled from Plagwitz. Services ran via Leipzig Hauptbahnhof to Gaschwitz from 3 June 1984, as the result of an exchange of part of the route of line A. The line was renamed S1 at the timetable change on 31 May 1992. Later the route was shortened to terminate at the Hauptbahnhof.

Due to a reduction in the provision of public transport funds by the Free State of Saxony, the Zweckverband für den Nahverkehrsraum Leipzig (Leipzig municipal association for urban transport, ZVNL) decided in February 2011 to suspend services on S-Bahn Line S1 and thus passenger operations on this line from 30 April 2011 until the opening of the City Tunnel. Afterwards, the line was integrated into the new network of the S-Bahn Mitteldeutschland. In the meantime, the first three halts were rehabilitated for a total of around €2.5 million, together with a major renewal of the track infrastructure from April to September 2013 at a cost of €10 million. In March 2013, the ZVNL decided to restart services on the line from 15 December 2013 with a route from Leipzig-Grünau through the City Tunnel to Leipzig-Stötteritz or Wurzen.

== Route description ==
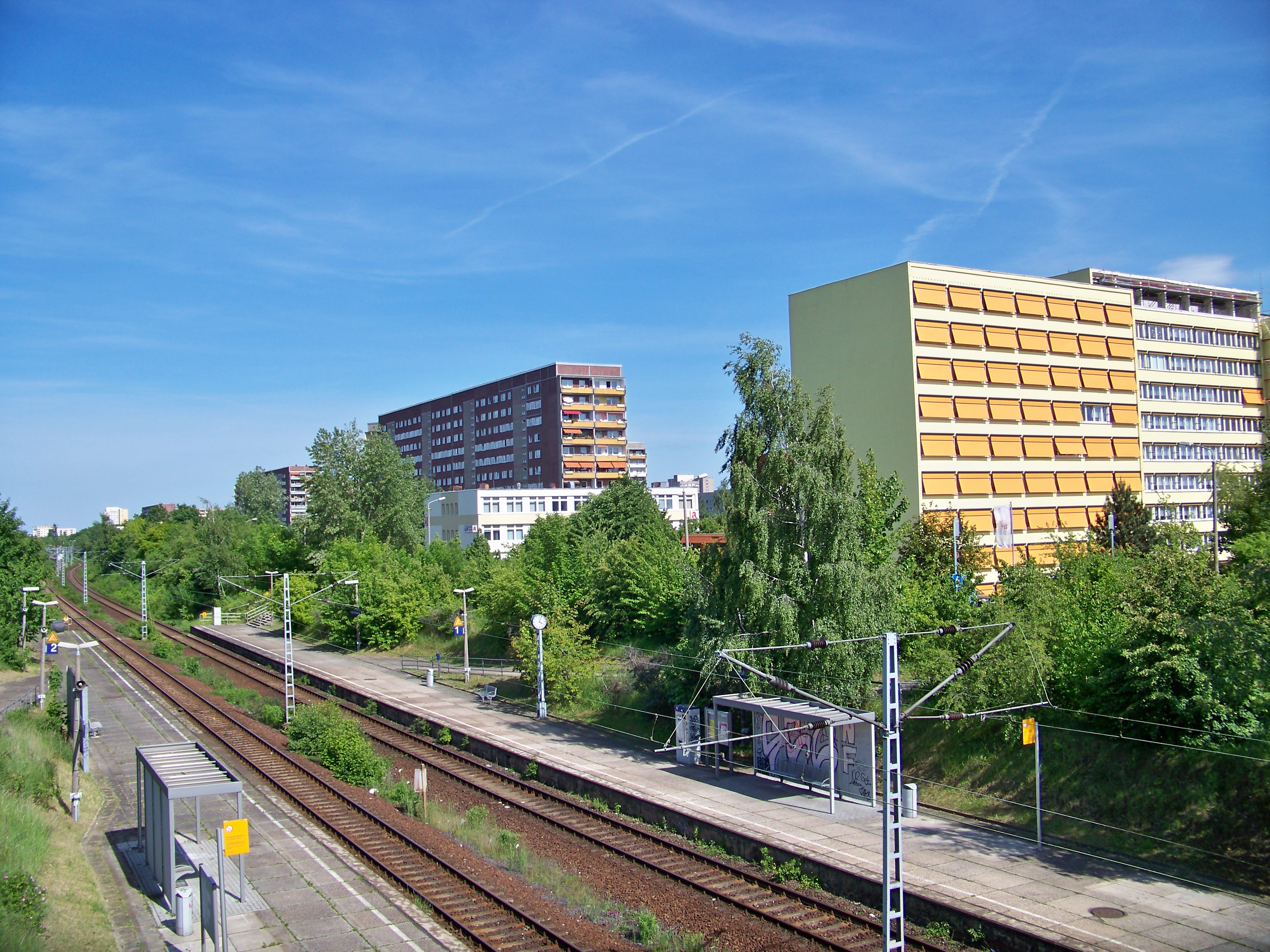
Karlsruher Straße halt, one of four stations in Grünau

The 4.6 kilometre-long railway runs from Leipzig-Plagwitz towards the west. It runs east–west in a cutting through the centre of a district of pre-fabricated apartments and ends at its western edge. Four stations are located near access roads that cross the railway tracks over bridges. Coming from the east these are Grünauer Allee, Stuttgarter Allee, Kiewer Straße and Miltitzer Allee. In contrast to the situation at their opening, only two of the stations are named after those streets, namely Grünauer Allee and Miltitzer Allee. The halt at Stuttgarter Allee is named after the neighbouring Einkaufszentrum Allee-Center (shopping centre), the halt at Kiewer Straße is named Karlsruher Straße. In the GDR era, other names were used that were connected to the regime.

The stations along the line all had low side platforms before the modernisation, with the exception of the terminal station of Miltitzer Allee. The only weather protection available is at waiting rooms. Access to the platforms is via stairs and ramps from the surrounding streets and bridges.

In contrast to other new suburbs on the outskirts of German cities, the rest of the public transport network in Grünau is not geared primarily to a central rapid-transit line. Instead, parallel tram lines run both north and south at a distance in both cases of approximately one kilometre and operate at a significantly higher frequency than the S-Bahn. This means that the S-Bahn has comparatively low passenger use.
