= Mitteldeutschland S-Bahn =

Electric rail public transit system in Germany

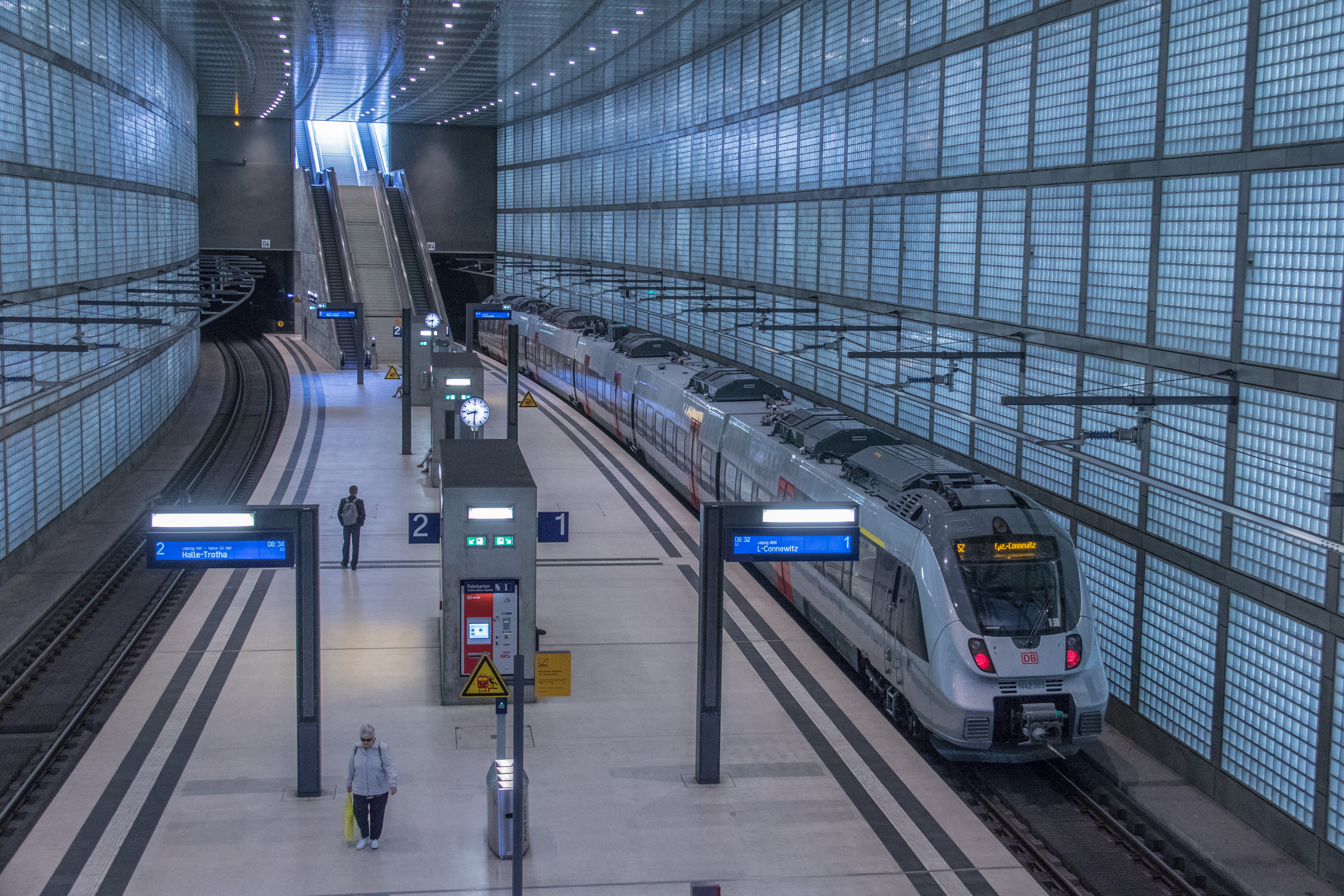
- A train at Leipzig Wilhelm-Leuschner-Platz railway station

Overview
- Area served: Central Germany
- Transit type: Rapid Transit, Regional rail
- Number of lines: 10
- Number of stations: 145
- Daily ridership: 90,000
- Website: www.s-bahn-mitteldeutschland.de

Operation
- Began operation: 15 December 2013
- Operator: DB Regio Südost
- Number of vehicles: 80 Bombardier Talent 2

Technical
- System length: 802 km (498 mi)
- Track gauge: 1,435 mm (4 ft 8 1/2 in) standard gauge
- Electrification: 15 kV 16 2/3 Hz AC catenary
- Top speed: 160 km/h (99 mph)
System map

Mitteldeutschland S-Bahn (German: S-Bahn Mitteldeutschland), lit. 'Central Germany S-Bahn', represents an enlargement of the previous Leipzig-Halle S-Bahn. It is an electric rail public transit system operating in the metropolitan area of Leipzig-Halle, Germany. This S-Bahn (German abbreviation for Stadtschnellbahn - lit. 'urban rapid [rail]road') network developed from two separate S-Bahn networks of Halle (Saale) and Leipzig, which were established separately in 1969 and then linked in 2004. With the opening of the Leipzig City Tunnel on 15 December 2013 as a new artery, the network was extended for the first time to the federal states of Thuringia and Brandenburg. With a system length of 802 km (498 mi), it is the largest S-Bahn network in Germany, displacing the long-time title holder Rhine-Ruhr S-Bahn from that position. The locomotive-hauled double-decker trains partly dating back to the DDR-era have been largely replaced by electric multiple unit Bombardier Talent 2 trains, but some older trains are still used during rush hour.

It is operated by DB Regio Südost, Verkehrsbetrieb Mitteldeutschland mainly on behalf of Zweckverband für den Nahverkehrsraum Leipzig (ZVNL) and Nahverkehrsservicegesellschaft Sachsen-Anhalt GmbH (nasa), but also another four public transport authorities in Saxony, Thuringia (Nahverkehrsservicegesellschaft Thüringen) and Brandenburg (Verkehrsverbund Berlin-Brandenburg).

== Network ==
=== Tendering ===
The Europe-wide call for tender took place in August 2008, with service intended to begin in December 2011. But the start of service was suspended by two correction notices to December 2013 (as of January 2010).

After the expiration of the appeal period given by the regional transport authorities on 21 September 2010, the final running of the restructured network, now known as S-Bahn Mitteldeutschland, was awarded to the Deutsche Bahn subsidiary S-Bahn Mitteldeutschland GmbH. The competitor, Veolia, raised no objection against this but criticized the DB for its calculation on the basis that the proposed vehicle - the Bombardier Talent 2 - had not yet been approved.

In mid-2011, the Transportation Service Company of Saxony-Anhalt, NASA, announced the tender of the second stage of the S-Bahn Mitteldeutschland network. Starting in December 2015, the transport company which won the tender would provide service for nine years. In addition to various regional railway lines and the RE-line Magdeburg-Dessau-Leipzig, the tender also included the extended line S2 and the new S8 line. This tender was also won by DB Regio. Due to ongoing construction works at Halle (Saale) Hauptbahnhof, proposed lines S8 und S9 will start service at a later date.

=== Network as of December 2024 ===
Line	Route	Frequency (min.)
S 1	Leipzig Miltitzer Allee – L. Karlsruher Straße – L. Allee-Center – L. Grünauer Allee – L.-Plagwitz – L.-Lindenau – L.-Leutzsch – L.-Möckern – L. Coppiplatz – L.-Gohlis – Leipzig Hbf (lower) – L. Markt – L. Wilhelm-Leuschner-Platz – L. Bayerischer Bahnhof – L. MDR – L. Völkerschlachtdenkmal – L.-Stötteritz	30
S 10	Leipzig Miltitzer Allee – L. Karlsruher Straße – L. Allee-Center – L. Grünauer Allee – L.-Plagwitz – L.-Lindenau – L.-Leutzsch – L.-Möckern – L. Coppiplatz – L.-Gohlis – Leipzig Hbf (upper)	30 (Mon–Fri) (6.00–19.00)
S 2	Jüterbog – Niedergörsdorf – Blönsdorf – Zahna – Bülzig – Zörnigall – Lutherstadt Wittenberg Hbf	Some trains
S 2	Lutherstadt Wittenberg Hbf – Pratau – Bergwitz – Radis – Gräfenhainichen – Burgkemnitz – Muldenstein – Bitterfeld	120
S 2	Dessau Hbf – Dessau Süd – Marke – Raguhn – Jeßnitz (Anh) – Wolfen – Greppin – Bitterfeld	120
S 2	Bitterfeld – Petersroda – Delitzsch unt Bf	30 (Mon–Fri); 60 (Sat+Sun)
S 2	Delitzsch unt Bf – Zschortau – Rackwitz (Leipzig) – Leipzig Messe – L. Essener Straße – Leipzig Nord – Leipzig Hbf (lower) – L. Markt – L. Wilhelm-Leuschner-Platz – L. Bayerischer Bahnhof – L. MDR – L. Völkerschlachtdenkmal – L.-Stötteritz	30
S 3	Halle-Nietleben – Halle-Neustadt – Halle Zscherbener Straße – Halle-Südstadt – Halle-Silberhöhe – Halle Rosengarten – Halle (Saale) Hbf – Halle Messe – Dieskau – Gröbers – Großkugel – Schkeuditz West – Schkeuditz – L.-Lützschena – L.-Wahren – L. Slevogtstraße – L. Olbrichtstraße – L.-Gohlis – Leipzig Hbf (lower) – L. Markt – L. Wilhelm-Leuschner-Platz – L. Bayerischer Bahnhof – L. MDR – L. Völkerschlachtdenkmal – L.-Stötteritz – L. Anger-Crottendorf – Engelsdorf – Borsdorf (Sachs) – Gerichshain – Machern (Sachs) – Altenbach – Bennewitz – Wurzen	30
S 3	Wurzen – Kühren – Dahlen (Sachs) – Oschatz	60 (Mon–Fri) (6.00–8.00, 14.00–18.00)
S 4	Falkenberg (Elster) – Rehfeld (Falkenberg) – Beilrode – Torgau	120
S 4	Torgau – Mockrehna – Doberschütz – Eilenburg Ost – Eilenburg – Jesewitz – Pönitz (Leipzig) – Taucha (Leipzig)	60
S 4	Taucha (Leipzig) – L.-Heiterblick – L.-Thekla – L.-Mockauer Straße – Leipzig Nord – Leipzig Hbf (lower) – L. Markt – L. Wilhelm-Leuschner-Platz – L. Bayerischer Bahnhof – L. MDR – L.-Connewitz – Markkleeberg Nord – Markkleeberg – Markkleeberg-Großstädteln – Markkleeberg-Gaschwitz	30
S 5	Halle (Saale) Hbf – Leipzig/Halle Airport – Leipzig Messe – Leipzig Hbf (lower) – L. Markt – L. Wilhelm-Leuschner-Platz – L. Bayerischer Bahnhof – L. MDR – L.-Connewitz – Markkleeberg Nord – Markkleeberg – Böhlen (Leipzig) – Böhlen Werke – Neukieritzsch – Deutzen – Regis-Breitingen – Treben-Lehma – Altenburg	60
S 5	Altenburg – Lehndorf (Altenburg) – Gößnitz – Ponitz – Crimmitschau – Schweinsburg-Culten – Werdau Nord – Werdau – Steinpleis – Lichtentanne (Sachs) – Zwickau (Sachs) Hbf	120
S 5X	Halle (Saale) Hbf – Leipzig/Halle Airport – Leipzig Messe – Leipzig Hbf (lower) – L. Markt – L. Wilhelm-Leuschner-Platz – L. Bayerischer Bahnhof – L. MDR – L.-Connewitz – Markkleeberg Nord – Markkleeberg – Böhlen (Leipzig) – Altenburg – Lehndorf (Altenburg) – Gößnitz – Ponitz – Crimmitschau – Schweinsburg-Culten – Werdau Nord – Werdau – Steinpleis – Lichtentanne (Sachs) – Zwickau (Sachs) Hbf Only some trains stop in Lehndorf (Altenburg), Ponitz, Schweinsburg-Culten, Werdau Nord, Steinpleis and Lichtentanne (Sachs).	60
S 6	Leipzig Messe – L. Essener Straße – Leipzig Nord – Leipzig Hbf (tief) – L. Markt – L. Wilhelm-Leuschner-Platz – L. Bayerischer Bahnhof – L. MDR – L.-Connewitz – Markkleeberg Nord – Markkleeberg – Markkleeberg Großstädteln – Markkleeberg-Gaschwitz – Großdeuben – Böhlen (Leipzig) – Böhlen Werke – Neukieritzsch – Lobstädt – Borna (Leipzig)	30
S 6	Borna (Leipzig) – Petergrube – Neukirchen-Wyhra – Frohburg – Geithain	60
S 7	Halle (Saale) Hbf – Halle Rosengarten – Halle-Silberhöhe – Halle-Südstadt – Angersdorf – Zscherben – Teutschenthal Ost – Teutschenthal – Wansleben am See – Amsdorf – Röblingen am See – Erdeborn – Lutherstadt Eisleben	60
S 7	Lutherstadt Eisleben – Wolferode – Blankenheim – Riestedt – Sangerhausen; This line is operated by Abellio Rail Mitteldeutschland.	Some trains
S 8	Jüterbog – Niedergörsdorf – Blönsdorf – Zahna – Bülzig – Zörnigall – Lutherstadt Wittenberg Hbf	Some trains
S 8	Lutherstadt Wittenberg Hbf – Pratau – Bergwitz – Radis – Gräfenhainichen – Burgkemnitz – Muldenstein – Bitterfeld	120
S 8	Dessau Hbf – Dessau Süd – Marke – Raguhn – Jeßnitz (Anh) – Wolfen – Greppin – Bitterfeld	120
S 8	Bitterfeld – Roitzsch – Brehna – Landsberg – Hohenthurm – Halle (Saale) Hbf	30 (Mon–Fri); 60 (Sat+Sun)
S 9	Halle (Saale) Hbf – Peißen – Reußen – Landsberg Süd – Klitschmar – Kyhna – Delitzsch ob Bf – Hohenroda – Krensitz – Kämmereiforst – Eilenburg	120; 60 (peak)
S 11	Halle (Saale) Hbf – Halle-Ammendorf – Schkopau – Merseburg Hbf – Merseburg Bergmannsring – Beuna (Geißeltal) – Frankleben – Braunsbedra Pfännerhall – Braunsbedra – Krumpa – Mücheln (Geißeltal) Stadt – Langeneichstädt – Nemsdorf-Göhrendorf – Querfurt	60
S 47	Halle-Trotha – H. Wohnstadt Nord – H. Zoo – H. Dessauer Brücke – H. Steintorbrücke – Halle (Saale) Hbf	60

Peak hour = 5.00 – 9.00 and 14.00 – 19.00

=== Network as of December 2017 ===
The following lines constitute the S-Bahn Mitteldeutschland network as of 10 December 2017:

Line	Route
S 1	Leipzig Miltitzer Allee – Leipzig-Leutzsch – Leipzig-Gohlis – Leipzig City Tunnel – Leipzig-Stötteritz
S 2	Dessau Hbf/(Jüterbog–) Lutherstadt Wittenberg Hbf – Bitterfeld – Delitzsch unt Bf – Leipzig Messe – Leipzig City Tunnel – Leipzig-Stötteritz
S 3	Halle-Trotha – Halle (Saale) Hbf – Schkeuditz – Leipzig-Gohlis – Leipzig City Tunnel - Leipzig-Connewitz (– Markkleeberg – Markkleeberg-Gaschwitz)
S 4	Hoyerswerda – Ruhland – Falkenberg (Elster) – Torgau – Eilenburg – Taucha – Leipzig-Thekla – Leipzig City Tunnel – Leipzig-Stötteritz – Wurzen - Oschatz
S 5	(Halle (Saale) Hbf –) Leipzig/Halle Airport – Leipzig Messe – Leipzig City Tunnel – Leipzig-Connewitz – Markkleeberg – Altenburg – Zwickau Hbf
S 5X	Halle (Saale) Hbf – Leipzig/Halle Airport – Leipzig Messe – Leipzig City Tunnel – Leipzig-Connewitz – Markkleeberg – Altenburg – Zwickau Hbf
S 6	Leipzig Messe – Leipzig Nord – Leipzig City Tunnel – Leipzig-Connewitz – Markkleeberg – Markkleeberg-Gaschwitz – Borna – Geithain
S 7	Halle (Saale) Hbf – Halle-Südstadt – Halle-Neustadt – Halle-Nietleben
S 8	Dessau Hbf/(Jüterbog–) Lutherstadt Wittenberg Hbf – Bitterfeld – Landsberg – Halle (Saale) Hbf
S 9	Halle (Saale) Hbf – Delitzsch ob Bf – Eilenburg

=== Network from December 2016 to December 2017 ===
The following lines constitute the S-Bahn Mitteldeutschland network since 11 December 2016:

Line	Route
S 1	Leipzig Miltitzer Allee – Leipzig-Leutzsch – Leipzig-Gohlis – Leipzig City Tunnel – Leipzig-Stötteritz
S 11	Leipzig Messe – Leipzig Nord – Leipzig City Tunnel – Leipzig-Stötteritz
S 2	Dessau Hbf – Bitterfeld – Delitzsch unt Bf – Leipzig Messe – Leipzig City Tunnel – Leipzig-Connewitz (– Markkleeberg – Markkleeberg-Gaschwitz)
S 3	Halle-Trotha – Halle (Saale) Hbf – Schkeuditz – Leipzig-Gohlis – Leipzig City Tunnel – Leipzig-Connewitz – Markkleeberg – Markkleeberg-Gaschwitz – Borna – Geithain
S 4	Hoyerswerda – Ruhland – Falkenberg (Elster) – Torgau – Eilenburg – Taucha – Leipzig-Thekla – Leipzig City Tunnel – Leipzig-Stötteritz – Wurzen (– Oschatz – Riesa)
S 5	Halle (Saale) – Leipzig/Halle Airport – Leipzig Messe – Leipzig City Tunnel – Leipzig-Connewitz – Markkleeberg – Altenburg – Zwickau Hbf
S 5X	Leipzig/Halle Airport – Leipzig Messe – Leipzig City Tunnel – Leipzig-Connewitz – Markkleeberg – Altenburg – Zwickau Hbf
S 7	Halle (Saale) Hbf – Halle-Neustadt – Halle-Nietleben

The additional trains of the S1 running between Leipzig Messe and Leipzig-Stötteritz were renamed in S11, but were cancelled from September 2017 until December 2017 due to constructions works in the Leipzig area.

=== Network from December 2015 to December 2016 ===
The following lines constituted the S-Bahn Mitteldeutschland network from since 13 December 2015 until 10 December 2016:

Line	Route
S 1	Leipzig Miltitzer Allee – Leipzig-Leutzsch – Leipzig-Gohlis – Leipzig City Tunnel – Leipzig-Stötteritz
S 1	Leipzig Messe – Leipzig Nord – Leipzig City Tunnel – Leipzig-Stötteritz
S 2	Dessau Hbf – Bitterfeld – Delitzsch unt Bf – Leipzig Messe – Leipzig City Tunnel – Leipzig-Connewitz (– Markkleeberg – Markkleeberg-Gaschwitz)
S 3	Halle-Trotha – Halle (Saale) Hbf – Schkeuditz – Leipzig-Gohlis – Leipzig City Tunnel – Leipzig-Connewitz – Markkleeberg – Markkleeberg-Gaschwitz – Borna – Geithain
S 4	Hoyerswerda – Ruhland – Falkenberg (Elster) – Torgau – Eilenburg – Taucha – Leipzig-Thekla – Leipzig City Tunnel – Leipzig-Stötteritz – Wurzen (– Oschatz – Riesa)
S 5	Halle (Saale) – Leipzig/Halle Airport – Leipzig Messe – Leipzig City Tunnel – Leipzig-Connewitz – Markkleeberg – Altenburg – Zwickau Hbf
S 5X	Leipzig/Halle Airport – Leipzig Messe – Leipzig City Tunnel – Leipzig-Connewitz – Markkleeberg – Altenburg – Zwickau
S 7	Halle (Saale) Hbf – Halle-Neustadt – Halle-Nietleben

The system is run on a 30-minute basic schedule on each line. On external branches, such as Borna – Geithain (hourly), Taucha – Hoyerswerda (every two hours), Wurzen – Oschatz – Riesa (very few services a day, only at times when other regular services are not running) services are less frequent.

On the common sections, such as Leipzig-Messe – Leipzig City Tunnel – Markkleeberg-Gaschwitz (S2, S3, S5, S5X) and Leipzig-Nord – Leipzig City Tunnel – Leipzig-Stötteritz (S1 and S4), line overlaps result in compressed train frequencies. Through the area of the City Tunnel, the S-Bahn trains run as frequently as every 5 minutes.

=== Network from December 2013 to December 2015 ===
Line	Route
S 1	Leipzig Miltitzer Allee – Leipzig-Leutzsch – Leipzig-Gohlis – Leipzig City Tunnel – Leipzig-Stötteritz – Wurzen – Oschatz – Riesa
S 2	Bitterfeld – Delitzsch – Leipzig Messe – Leipzig City Tunnel – Leipzig-Connewitz – Markkleeberg – Markkleeberg-Gaschwitz
S 3	Halle (Saale) Hbf – Schkeuditz – Leipzig-Gohlis – Leipzig City Tunnel – Leipzig-Stötteritz
S 4	Hoyerswerda – Torgau – Eilenburg – Taucha – Leipzig-Thekla – Leipzig City Tunnel – Leipzig-Connewitz – Markkleeberg – Borna – Geithain
S 5	Leipzig/Halle Airport – Leipzig Messe – Leipzig City Tunnel – Leipzig-Connewitz – Markkleeberg – Altenburg – Zwickau
S 5X	Halle (Saale) Hbf – Leipzig/Halle Airport – Leipzig Messe – Leipzig City Tunnel – Leipzig-Connewitz – Markkleeberg – Altenburg – Zwickau
S 7	Halle-Trotha – Halle (Saale) Hbf – Halle-Neustadt – Halle-Nietleben

It was run on a 30-minute basic schedule. On external branches, such as Taucha–Hoyerswerda and Borna–Geithain, services were less frequent. On the common sections, such as Leipzig-Messe–Gaschwitz (S2, S4, S5, S5X) and Leipzig-Gohlis–Leipzig-Stötteritz (S1 and S3), line overlaps resulted in compressed train frequencies. Through the area of the City Tunnel, the S-Bahn trains run as frequently as every 5 minutes.

== History ==
The roots of S-Bahn Mitteldeutschland go back to two separate S-Bahn networks in Halle and Leipzig, which were established separately in 1969 and then linked in 2004.

=== The Halle Network ===
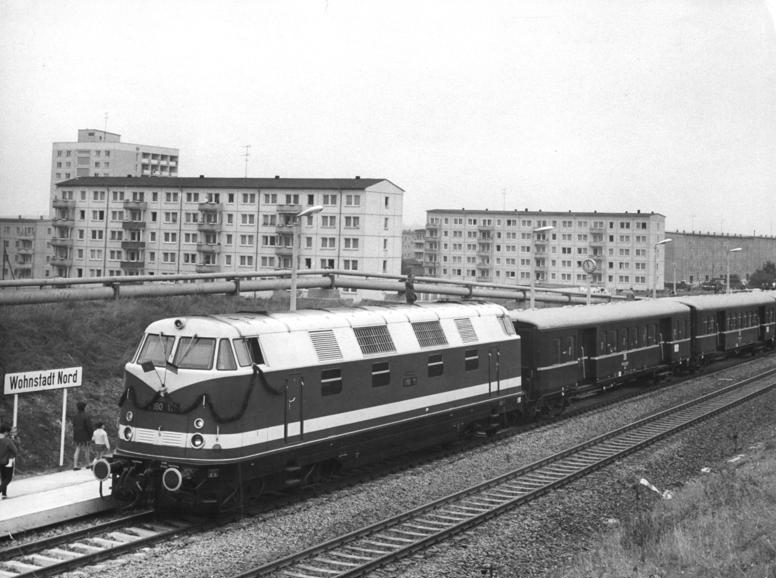
Train at opening on 27 September 1969

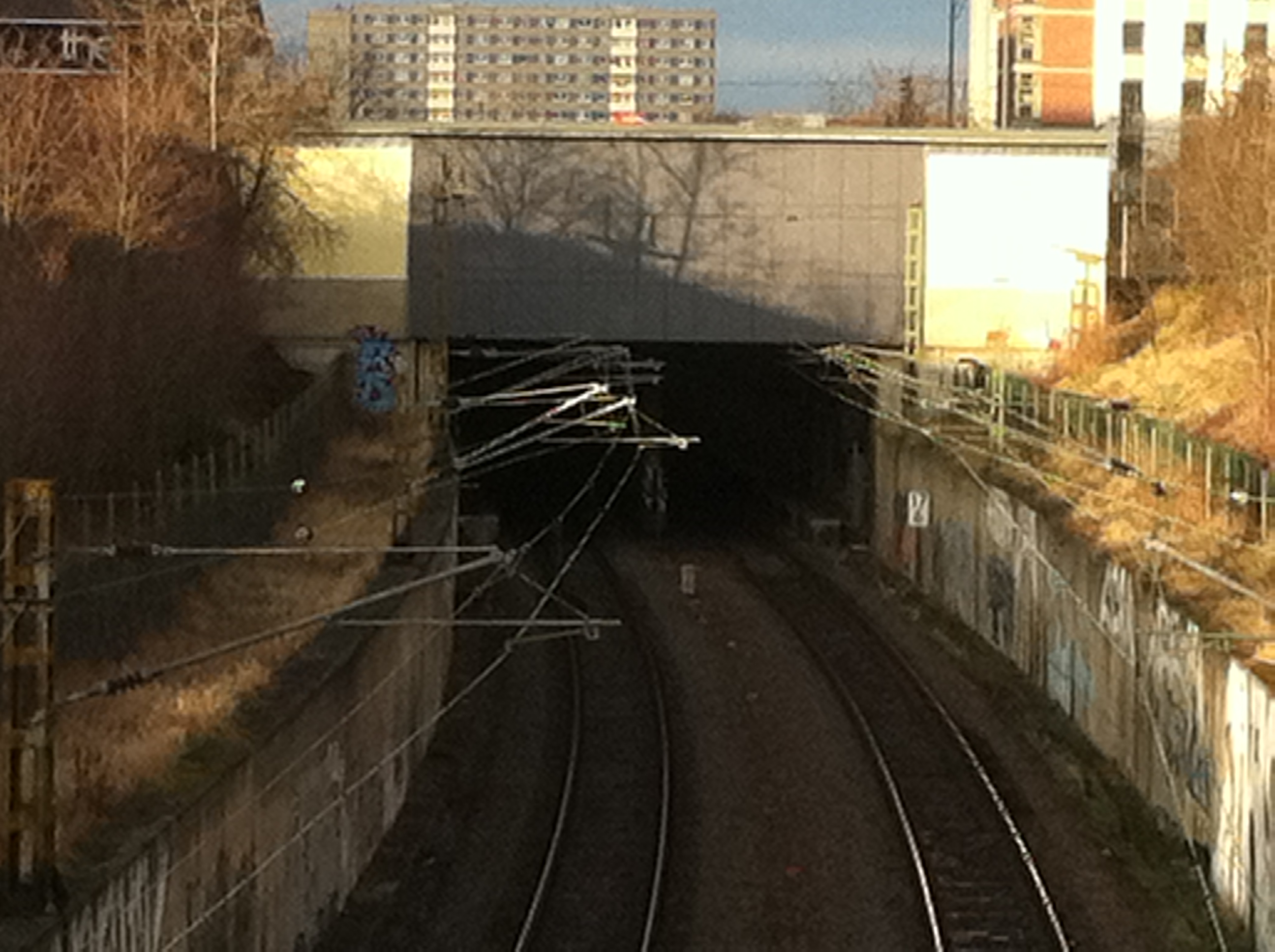
Southern portal of the S-Bahn tunnel in Halle

The Halle network used to connect the northern district of Halle-Trotha in a U-shaped route through the main train station with the residential suburb of Halle-Neustadt on the western bank of the Saale and then on to the last stop Halle-Dölau. Meanwhile, the track section from Halle-Nietleben to Halle-Dölau has been abandoned.

=== The Leipzig Network ===
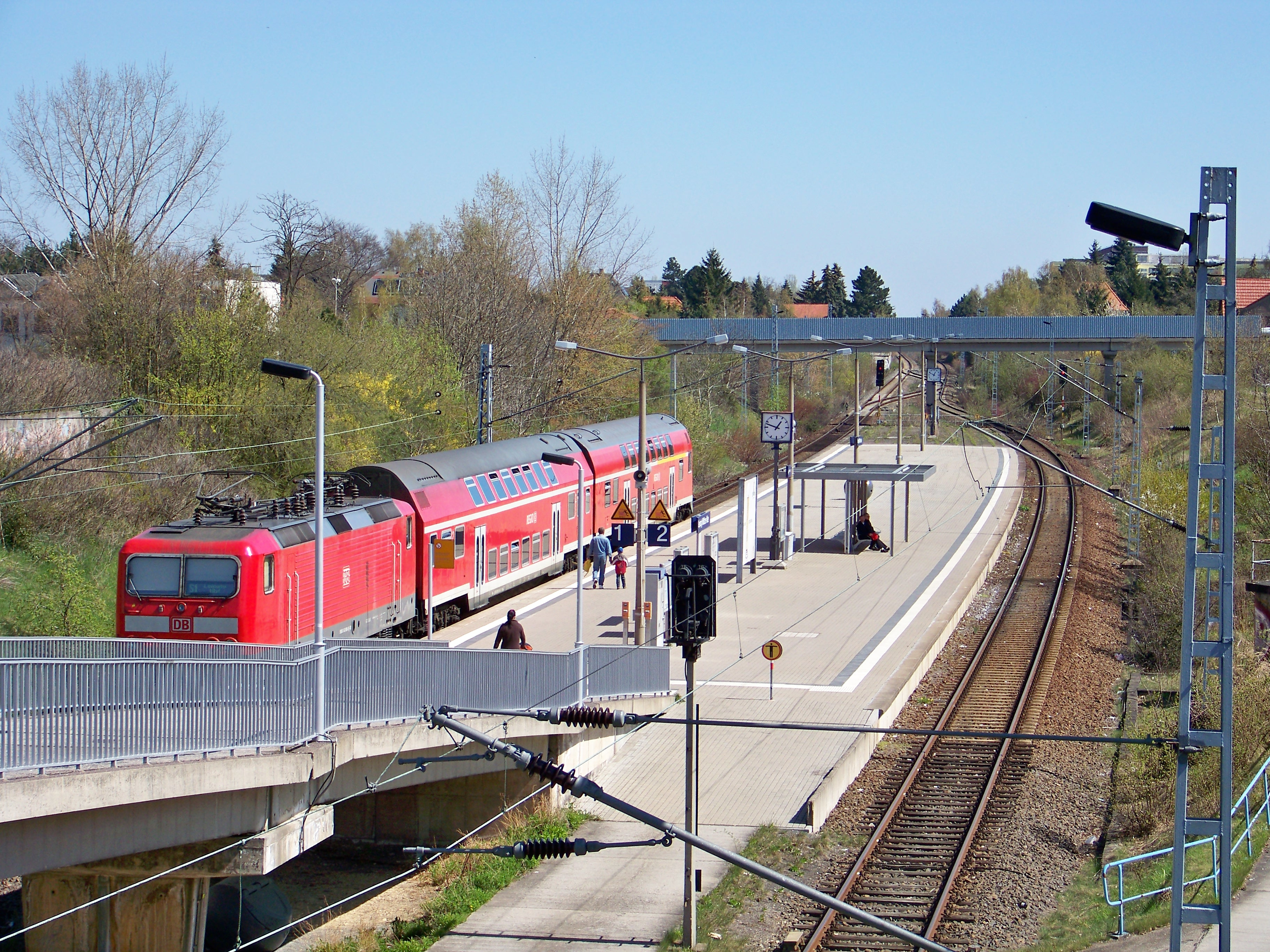
Train of the S-Bahn line 1 at the terminal station Miltitzer Allee

The Leipzig route network started northward from the main train station (a terminal station) going around on both sides of the city and joining in the south in Markkleeberg. This distinctive heart-shape was driven as a circular line in both directions, which ran to Gaschwitz in the south. Later lines were built out to Wurzen in the east and Grünau in the West.

On 29 February 1968, the Leipzig Bezirk government decided to build an S-Bahn network. Already at the spring trade fair, the "S-Bahn-style rapid transit" system was demonstrated between the main station and the newly established Messegelände (Exhibition Center) stop. By 12 July 1969, the S-Bahn network was expanded to the entire heart shape, in order to cope with traffic volume of the 5th East-German Gymnastics and Sports Festival (German: Turn- und Sportfest der DDR). The two branches were named S1 and S2. For the first two days the trains were free, which led to overcrowding. The fare then set absurdly high, with a single ride costing 50 Pfennig, a short distance ride up to five stations costing 30. Changing to transportation run by the Leipziger Verkehrsbetriebe (LVB), or motorized transport required a new ticket, although combined monthly tickets were issued. In contrast, a single ride ticket in the city of Berlin (with transfer) only cost 20 Pfennig and the rides on the LVB could be as low as 16.7 Pfennig, with the use of multiple-ride cards.

=== Connecting both networks to Leipzig-Halle S-Bahn in 2004 ===
S-Bahn Leipzig-Halle 2004-2013
- S-Bahn network 2009–2011

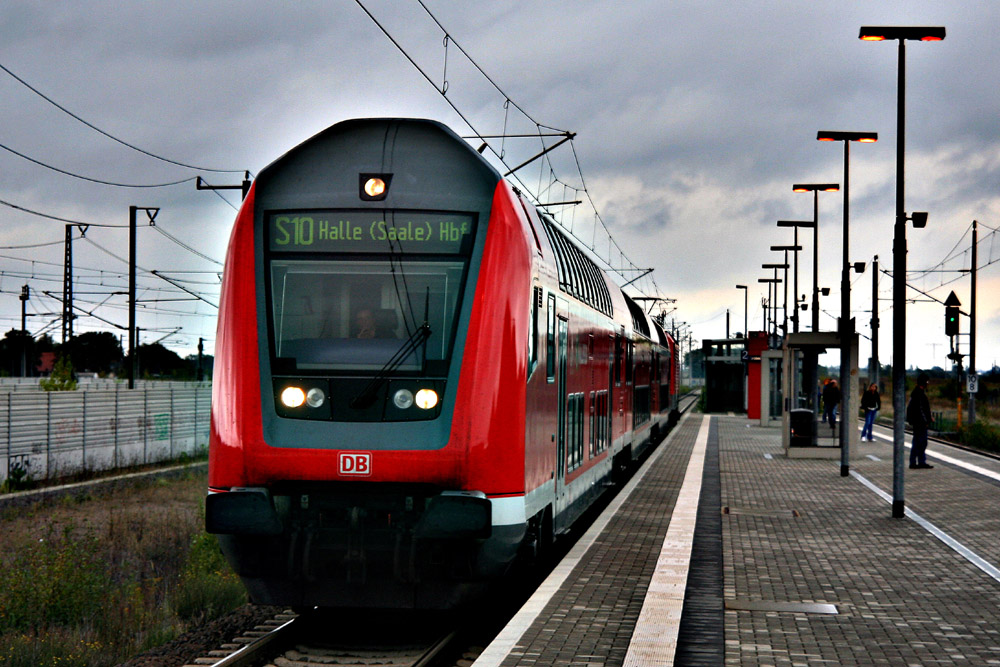
- A line 10 train of the Leipzig S-Bahn stops at Gröbers, headed for Halle

Overview
- Locale: Leipzig, Halle
- Transit type: Rapid Transit, Regional rail
- Number of lines: 2 (2011-2013)
- Number of stations: 24 (2011-2013)

Operation
- Began operation: 1969 / 2004
- Ended operation: 12 December 2013
- Operator: DB Regio Südost

Technical
- System length: 52 km (32 mi) (2011-2013)
- Track gauge: 1,435 mm (4 ft 8 1/2 in) (standard gauge)
- Electrification: 15 kV, 16.7 Hz AC Overhead lines

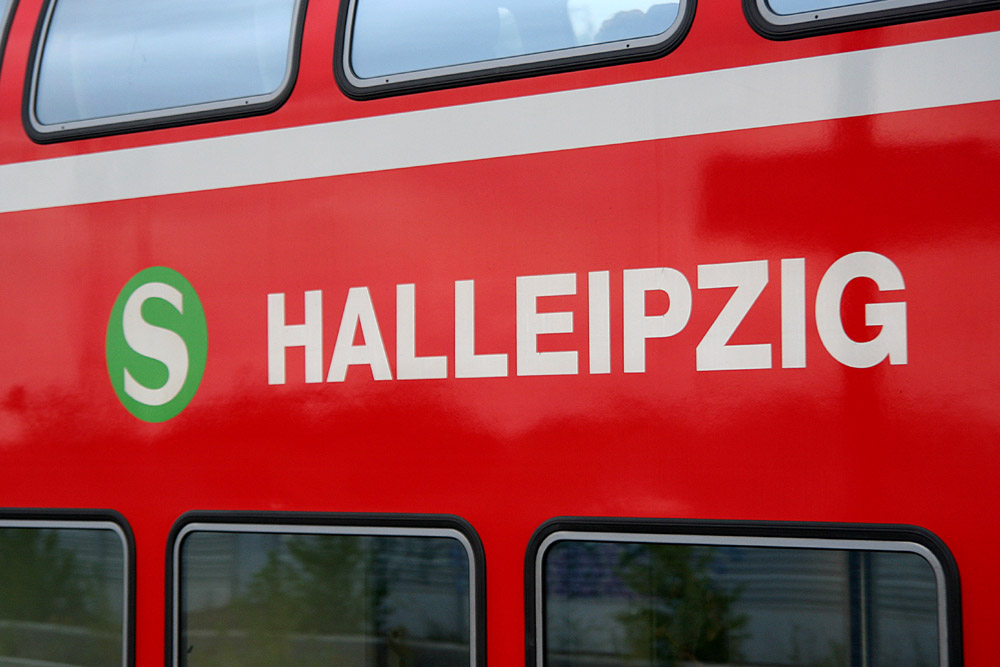
Lettering on an S-Bahn car Halle–Leipzig

Although dense suburban traffic between Leipzig and Halle had already existed for decades (from 1928, powered coaches and later series ET 41 ran on this route), a special tariff was never introduced on the line.

On 19 March 2002, construction work began in Halle for the new commuter train route between the two cities. The commissioning of the 234-million-euro project was planned for December 2004. The construction costs were raised primarily by the German federal government (135 million euros) and the states of Saxony-Anhalt (39 million euro) and Saxony (34 million euro). The project was completed on schedule on 12 December 2004.

In Leipzig, the route leads from the main station directly over the original route used for the decades only by freight trains of the Magdeburg-Leipzig Railway Company to Leipzig-Wahren. The existing RegionalBahn line 56 via Wiederitzsch was replaced by the S-Bahn line. As a result, the travel time of 36 minutes is unchanged, despite five stops being added. Since the 5 December, the RB 56 route has been reactivated in a trial run with passengers. In addition, the RegionalExpress line 5 trains took over the role of an "Express S-Bahn" which has run since 30 June 2003, in a special hourly service to the Leipzig/Halle Airport. It was not necessary to introduce a special tariff because of the existence of the Mitteldeutschen Verkehrsverbundes since August 2001.

=== Routes until April 2011 ===
In the times of the German Democratic Republic, Leipzig had three lines designated A, B and C. These were later changed to S 1, S 2 and S 3. The S 2 line (known as the "Forest Railway") was shut down in 2002. The S 1 line was then in 2004 divided into the lines S 1 and S 2 so that the platform ramps in the tunnel do not have to cross unnecessarily often.

- S 1, formerly A: Leipzig Miltitzer Allee – Leipzig-Plagwitz – Leipzig main station – Markkleeberg– Markkleeberg-Gaschwitz – Borna; since 2009 MRB 2.
- S 2, formerly C ("Forest Railway"): Leipzig-Plagwitz – Markkleeberg-Gaschwitz
- S 3, S 11, formerly B to Wurzen; since 2009 the MRB 11.

In 2009, the operation of the line that runs eastwards from the Leipzig main station was awarded to the Mitteldeutsche Regiobahn thus effectively reducing the size of the S-Bahn network. On the routes concerned, the timetable did not change.

Because of cost cutting, the remaining S 1 line between Leipzig Miltitzer Allee and Leipzig Hauptbahnhof was cancelled on 30 April 2011. As a replacement, two bus routes and additional tram services are being offered by the LVB. The S 1 line was to be reopened with finishing the City-Tunnel Leipzig and opening the new S-Bahn Mitteldeutschland network in December 2013.

=== Routes May 2011 - December 2013 ===
The S-Bahn Leipzig-Halle, which was operated by DB Regio then, comprised the two lines, the S 7 and S 10. Trains run about every 30 minutes.

Line	Route	Line length
S 7	Nietleben – Südstadt – Halle Hbf – Trotha	19.5 km
S 10	Halle Hbf – Dieskau – Gröbers – Schkeuditz – Gohlis – Leipzig Hbf	33.0 km

The former lines S 2 Leipzig Hauptbahnhof – Borna (– Geithain) and S 11 Leipzig Hauptbahnhof – Wurzen (– Oschatz) had been operated since 2009 by Mitteldeutsche Regiobahn (MRB) as lines MRB 2 resp. MRB 11 and were therefore not designated as S-Bahn routes any more. On weekend nights only, DB run a few services on the line 11 as S 11.

== Infrastructure ==
=== Leipzig City Tunnel ===
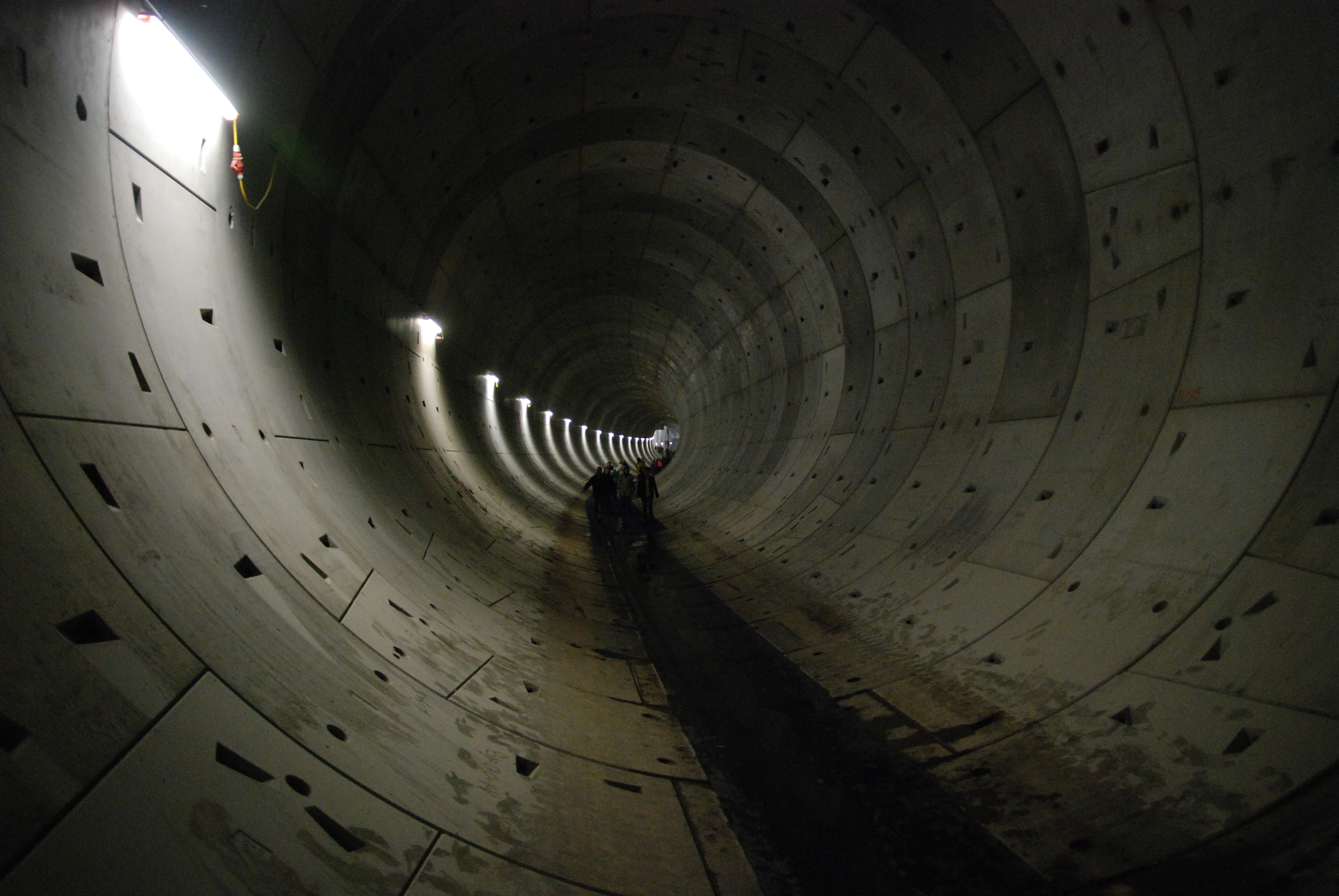
Completed eastern tube in May 2008

The main construction project for the new central German S-Bahn network was the City Tunnel in Leipzig, a twin bore railway tunnel running underneath the city centre of Leipzig. The project also included the refurbishment of some stations and electrification of some sections. The cost of this project was estimated at 570 million euros in 2002, however in 2010 it was announced the cost had increased to 960 million euros.

The tunnel crosses through the city for a length of 3.9 kilometres (2.4 mi) and is up to 25 metres (82 ft 0 in) deep. The tunnels form the main route of S-Bahn lines S1 to S5, servicing four stations built along the tunnel: Hauptbahnhof Tief (a "deep" section of the main station), Markt, Wilhelm-Leuschner-Platz and Bayerischer Bahnhof as well as the station Leipzig MDR/Semmelweisstraße where the tunnel surfaces in the south.

North of the main station and still underground, a cross-over separates line-sections running to Leipzig-Gohlis from those to Leipzig North/Berliner Brücke. The tunnel thus has a west and a north exit ramp at this end. Between the west ramp and station Leipzig-Gohlis, the route again separates to Schkeuditz and Leipzig-Leutzsch at a newly constructed above-ground cross-over.

For the southern exit of the tunnel, a fly-over for Richard-Lehmann street was built. The tracks towards Stötteritz pass under the tracks to and from Connewitz in an approximately 70 meter long tunnel.

=== Additional network enhancements ===
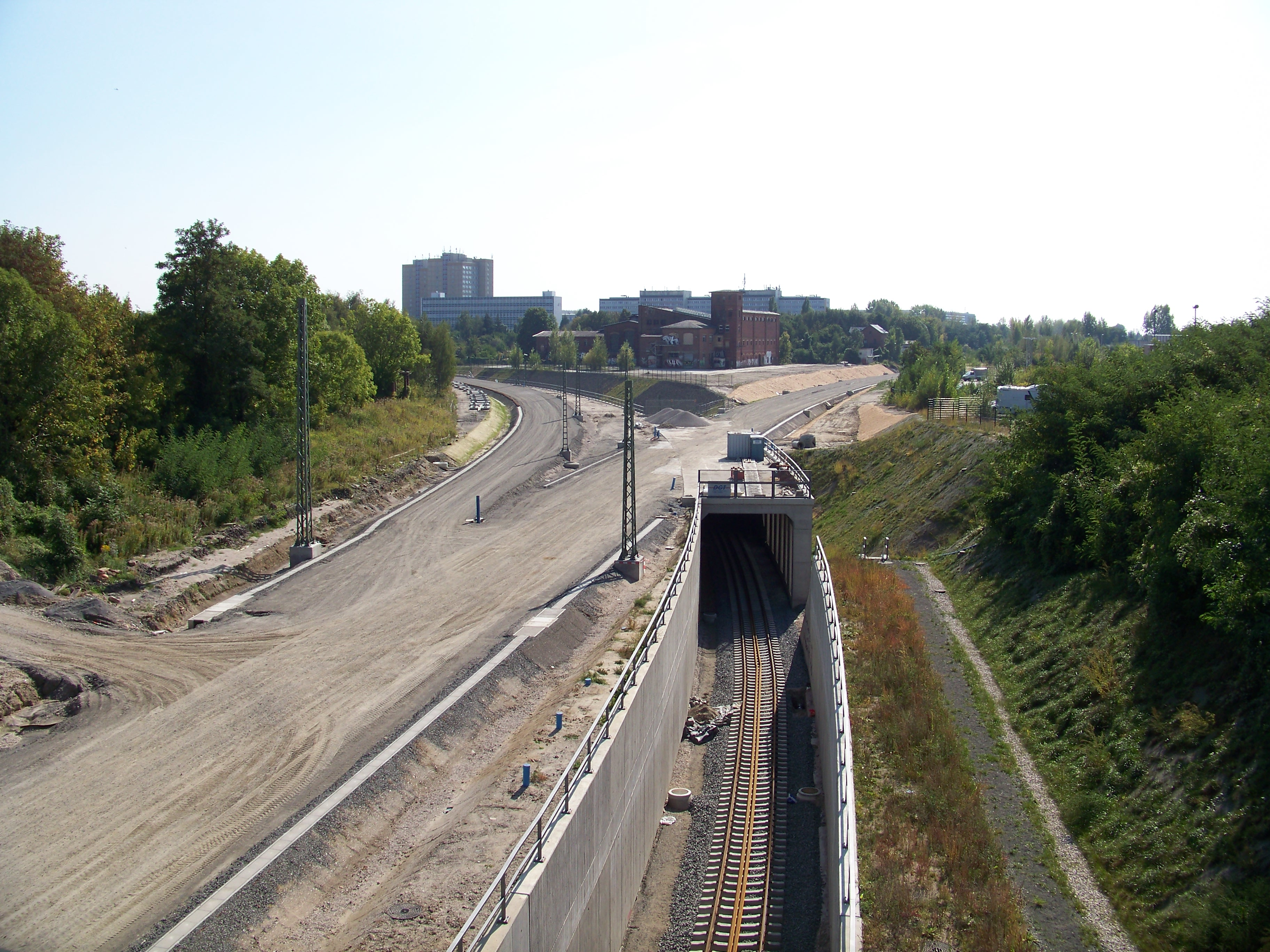
Under construction fly-over at Richard-Lehmann-Straße (September 2009)

To take full advantage of the tunnel, additional network enhancements were required.

Around the northern access to the tracks in the direction of Bitterfeld, a newly constructed S-Bahn stop Leipzig Nord on Theresienstraße has been completed. From 2013, the S 2, S 4 and S 5 trains stop here. Also planned are stations on Essener Straße and Mockauer Straße, but these will not be realized until later. In addition, Taucha train station will be completely rebuilt.

It will also be relatively complex to complete the southeast connection Gaschwitz - Engelsdorf along Leipzig–Hof railway. On the route towards Engelsdorf, the previous S-Bahn stop Leipzig-Völkerschlachtdenkmal has been abandoned and replaced by a newly built 140 metres (459 ft 4 in)-long center-platform directly below Prager Straße, stairs and an elevator. This is considered to provide additional access to the old fairgrounds. Also Leipzig-Stötteritz was completely rebuilt over Papiermühlstraße with new bridges and a three-track system. This station replaced a single-track reversing system on which train can change direction or turned off the track. Stötteritz is the endpoint of the S 3 line from December 2013. The LVB built a new tram stop directly under the S-Bahn station and thus provided improved connections. The S-Bahn stop Anger-Crottendorf was rebuilt on the current cargo ring of Zweinaundorfer Straße. A reconstruction of the station Leipzig-Paunsdorf in the area of today's freight station is being considered, however it will be built later. On the route south towards Gaschwitz, the station Leipzig-Connewitz was expanded to three tracks and received a new pedestrian bridge and access platform. The station Markkleeberg Nord was newly built, the stations Markkleeberg, Markkleeberg-Großstädteln and Markleeberg-Gaschwitz remodeled in a contemporary style.

In the area of the western connection, the route Leipzig-Leutzsch–Leipzig-Plagwitz (as of fall 2010) along Leipzig–Probstzella railway was being expanded and remodeled. Bridges, signal boxes, tracks and overhead lines as well as noise barriers had been erected. The current platforms in the station of Leipzig-Leutzsch and the stop Leipzig Industriegelände West were abandoned and new platforms directly under Georg-Schwarz-Straße replaced them. At a later point, the stops Leipzig-Lindenau and travel facilities of the station Leipzig-Plagwitz were completely redone and also finished by 2013. As part of this, the platforms in Leipzig-Plagwitz had been moved directly north to Karl-Heine-Straße and received new entrances. Renewal work was also undertaken on the route Leipzig-Leutzsch–Bad Dürrenberg along Leipzig–Großkorbetha railway.

=== Other construction work ===
Construction is already complete on the new S-Bahn line from Halle (Saale) Hauptbahnhof via Schkeuditz to Leipzig Hauptbahnhof, which already received several new stops such as Leipzig-Slevogtstraße and Schkeuditz West by 2004. From October 2008 until the summer of 2009, the tunnel station Halle-Neustadt was renovated. The total cost amounted to about 3.5 million euro. The platforms and stairways were modernized and, on the main traffic line, elevators were built. The completion of the construction work at the stops for the current S 7 and later S 3 were in the summer of 2009.

The Borna-Geithain section along Neukieritzsch–Chemnitz railway was electrified in the summer of 2010. This renovation was essential for the future use by S-Bahn line S 4.

The rebuilding and redesigning the station Merseburg started in 2011.

Further enhancements will take place in coming years.

== Rolling stock ==
=== Doppelstockwagen ===
Until December 2013, the Leipzig-Halle S-Bahn primarily used modernized first-generation Waggonbau Görlitz double-deck cars from the 1970s in push-pull configuration, using a locomotive and second-generation control cars produced in 1992. For the S10, new double-deck coaches were acquired in 2004. These used to be usually used only on this line.

Before the completion of all Talent 2 electric multiple units, the Deutsche Bahn enlisted the use of Class 182 locomotives coupled with Doppelstockwagen's to perform S-Bahn services. Although the locomotive had a top speed of 230 km/h (140 mph), they were limited to 160 km/h (99 mph) by the Doppelstockwagen. Once the delivery of the Talent 2 units had been fulfilled, these locomotives returned to universal work across the Deutsche Bahn, however some are occasionally used as additional S-Bahn services.

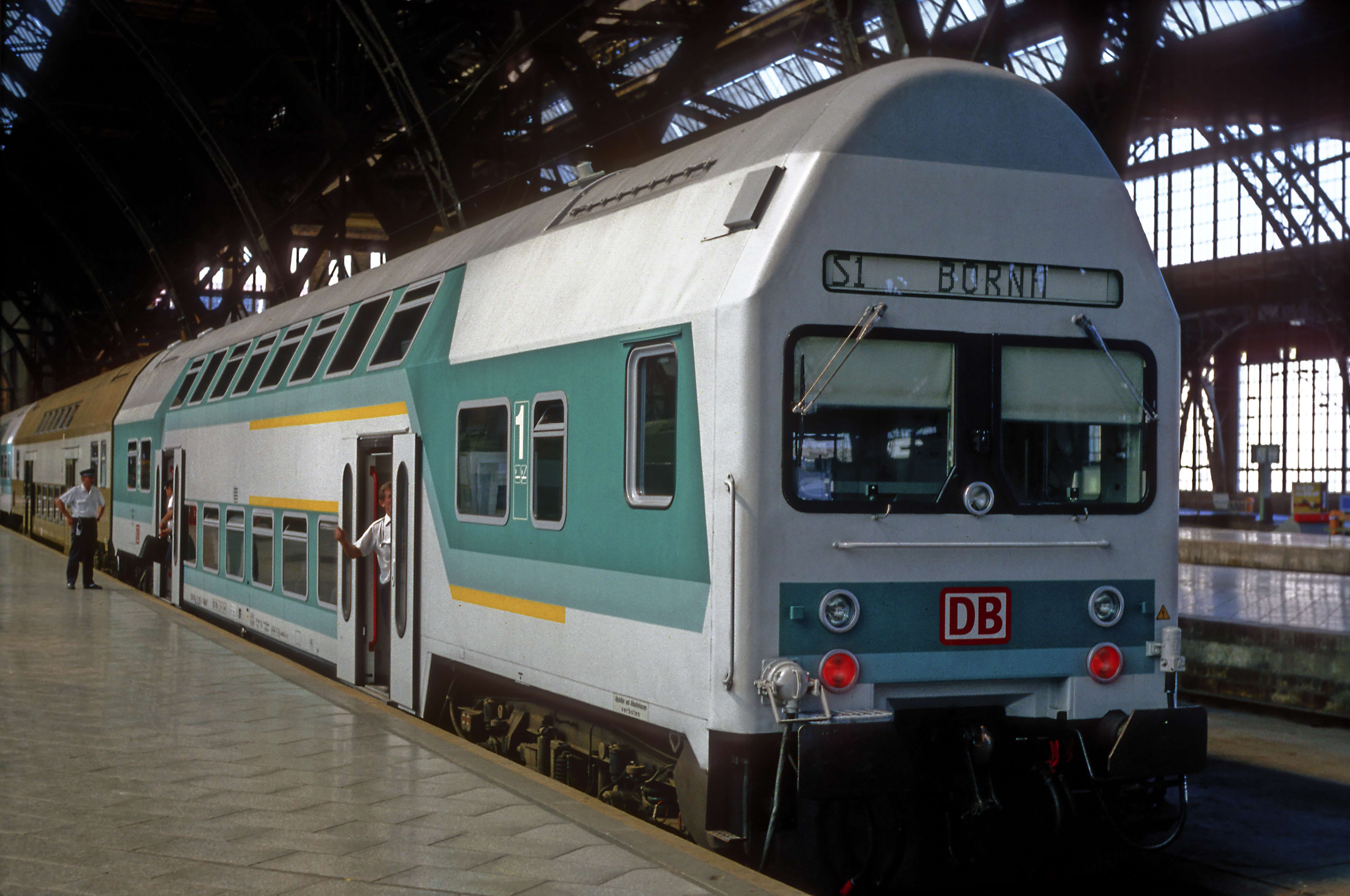
Partially modernized double-decker train with an old control car in 1995 at Leipzig Hauptbahnhof

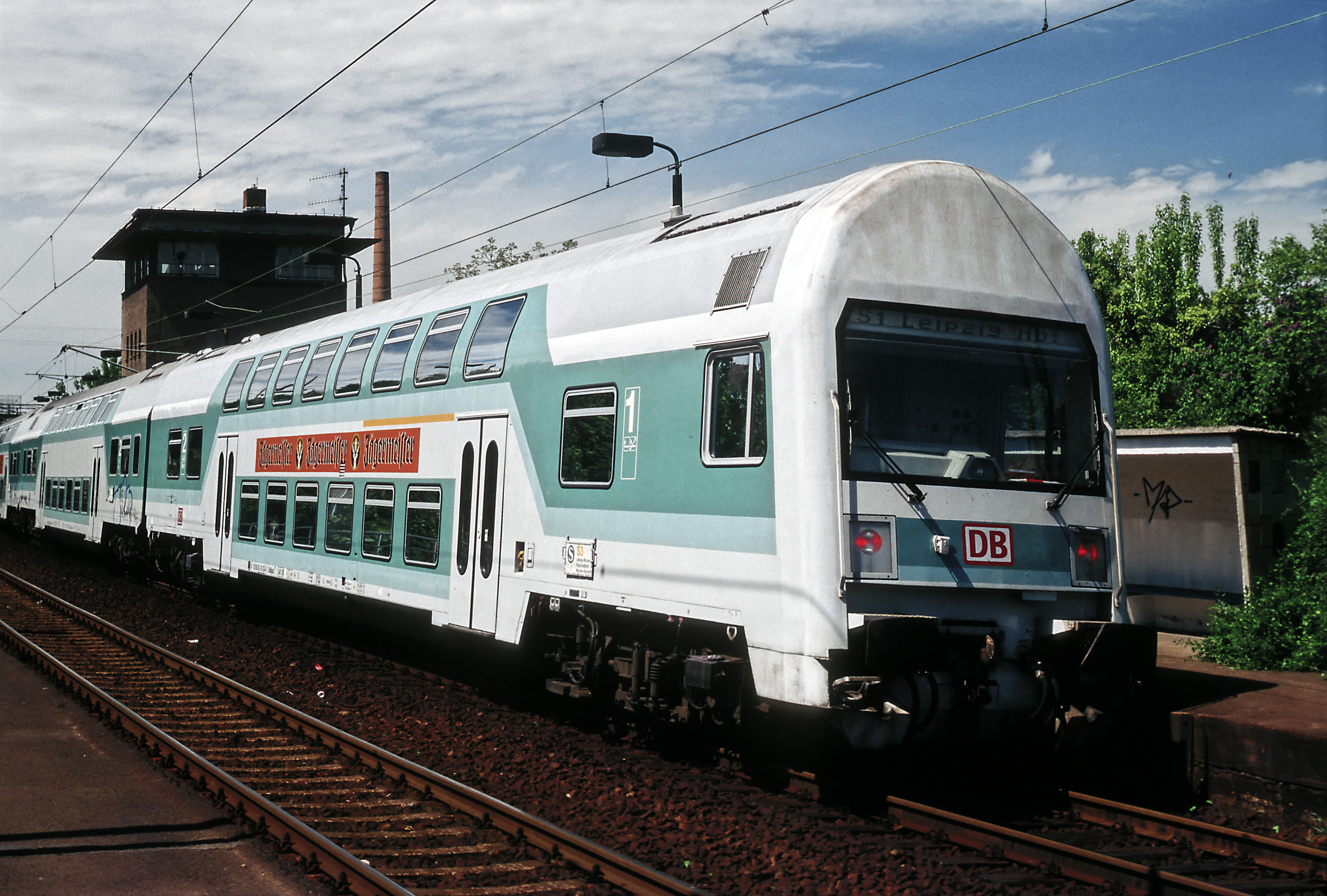
Modernized double-decker train of S1 with a 1992 control car in 1995 at Leipzig-Sellerhausen railway stop

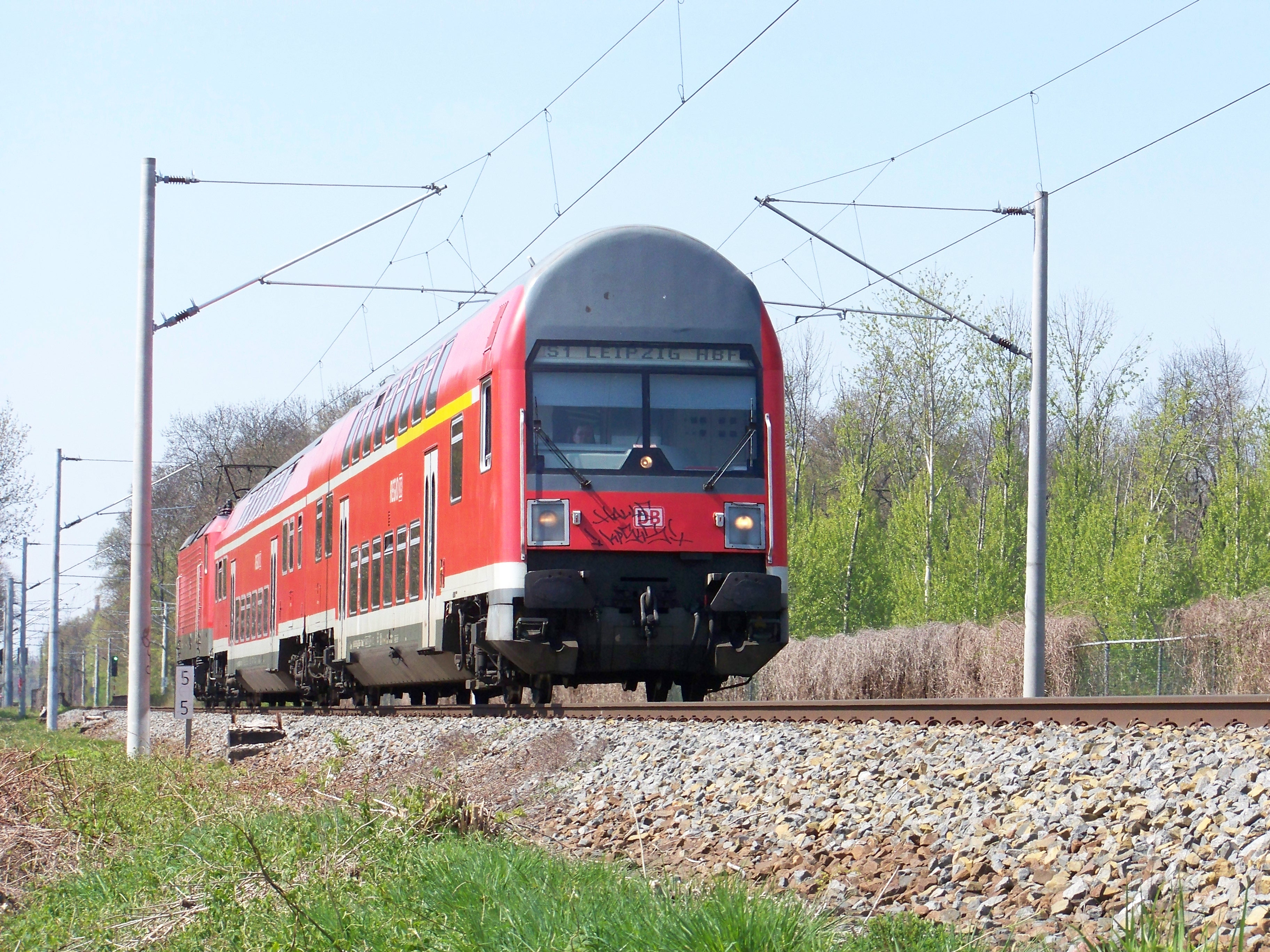
Modernized double-decker train of S1 with a 1992 control car in April 2010 between Leipzig-Leutzsch and Leipzig-Möckern in typical "DB-red" now

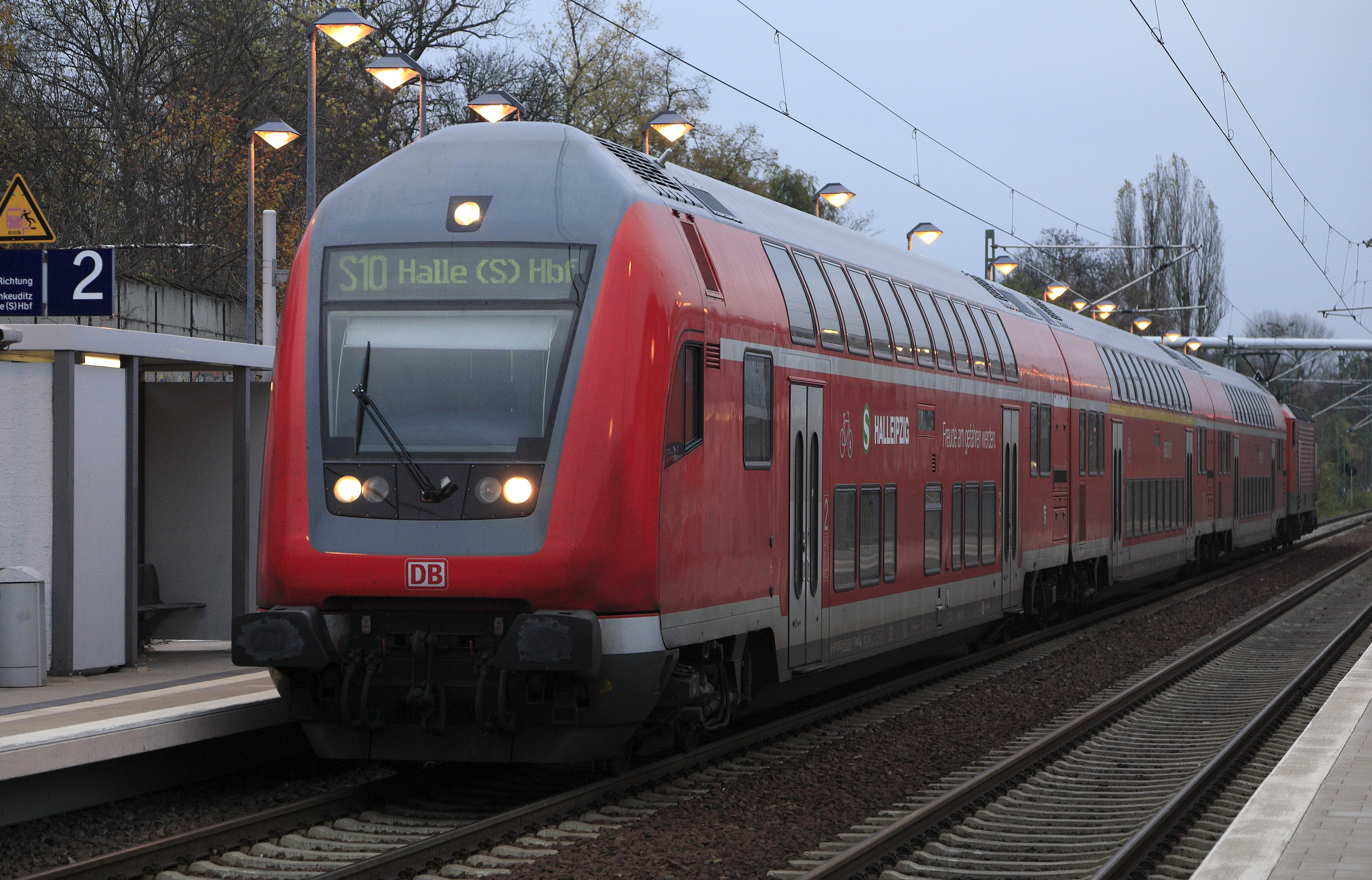
A new double-decker train, produced in 2004, running on line S10 in November 2013 at Leipzig Olbrichtstraße railway stop

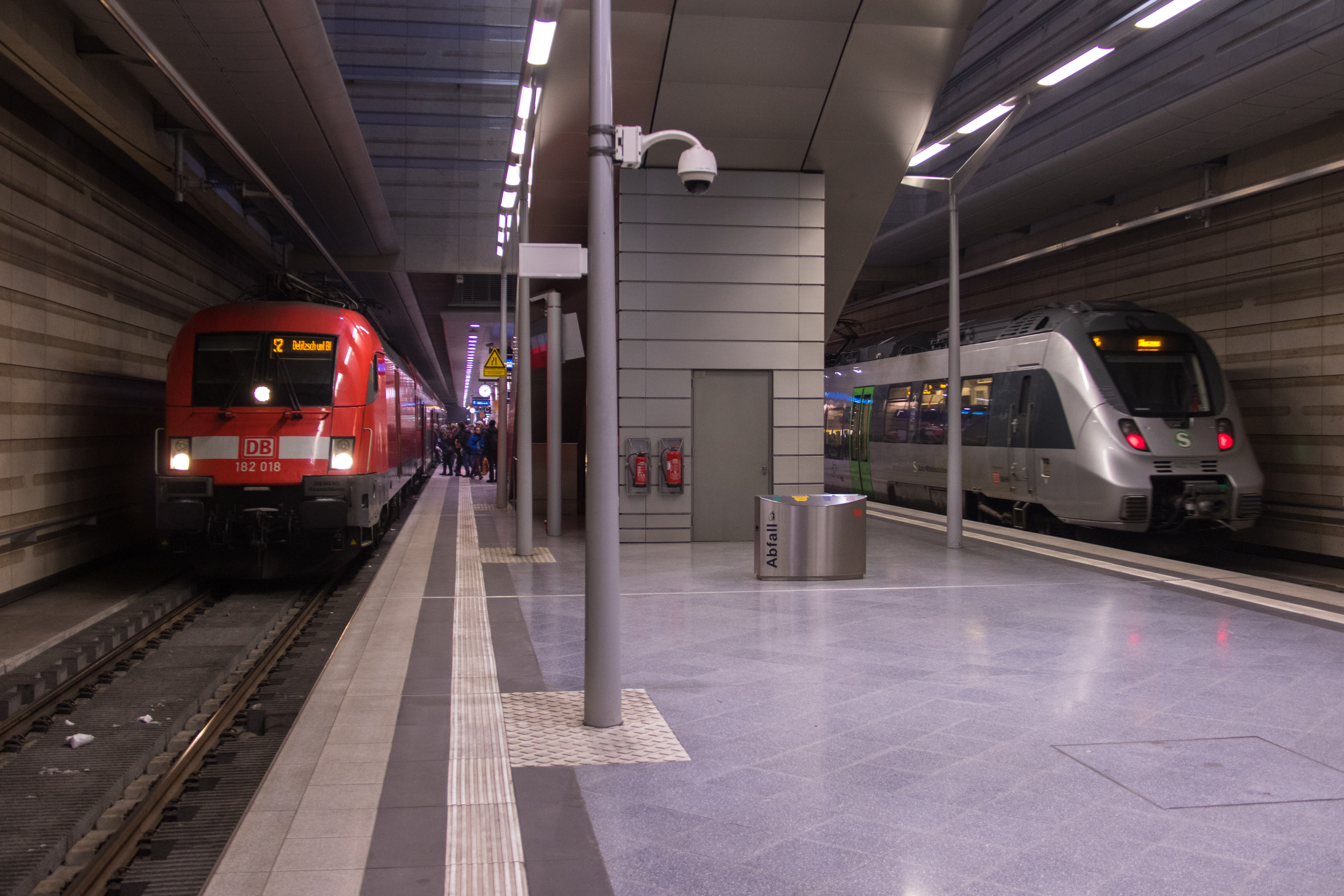
Class 182 of the Deutsche Bahn adjacent to a Talent 2 at Leipzig HBF Tief.

=== Bombardier Talent 2 ===
In December 2013, the S-Bahn Mitteldeutschland GmbH ordered a total of 51 Bombardier Talent 2 electric multiple units for passenger service, and a further 29 units in 2016. 55 trains have three sections, 15 have four sections, and 10 have 5 sections. The new vehicles have a top speed of 160 km/h (99 mph) and are decorated in silver and green, not in the typical "traffic-light red" of the Deutsche Bahn. The total investment in the new trains was about 200 million euro. Talent 2 trains are also used in central Germany on the RE routes from Leipzig to Dresden and Leipzig and Cottbus.

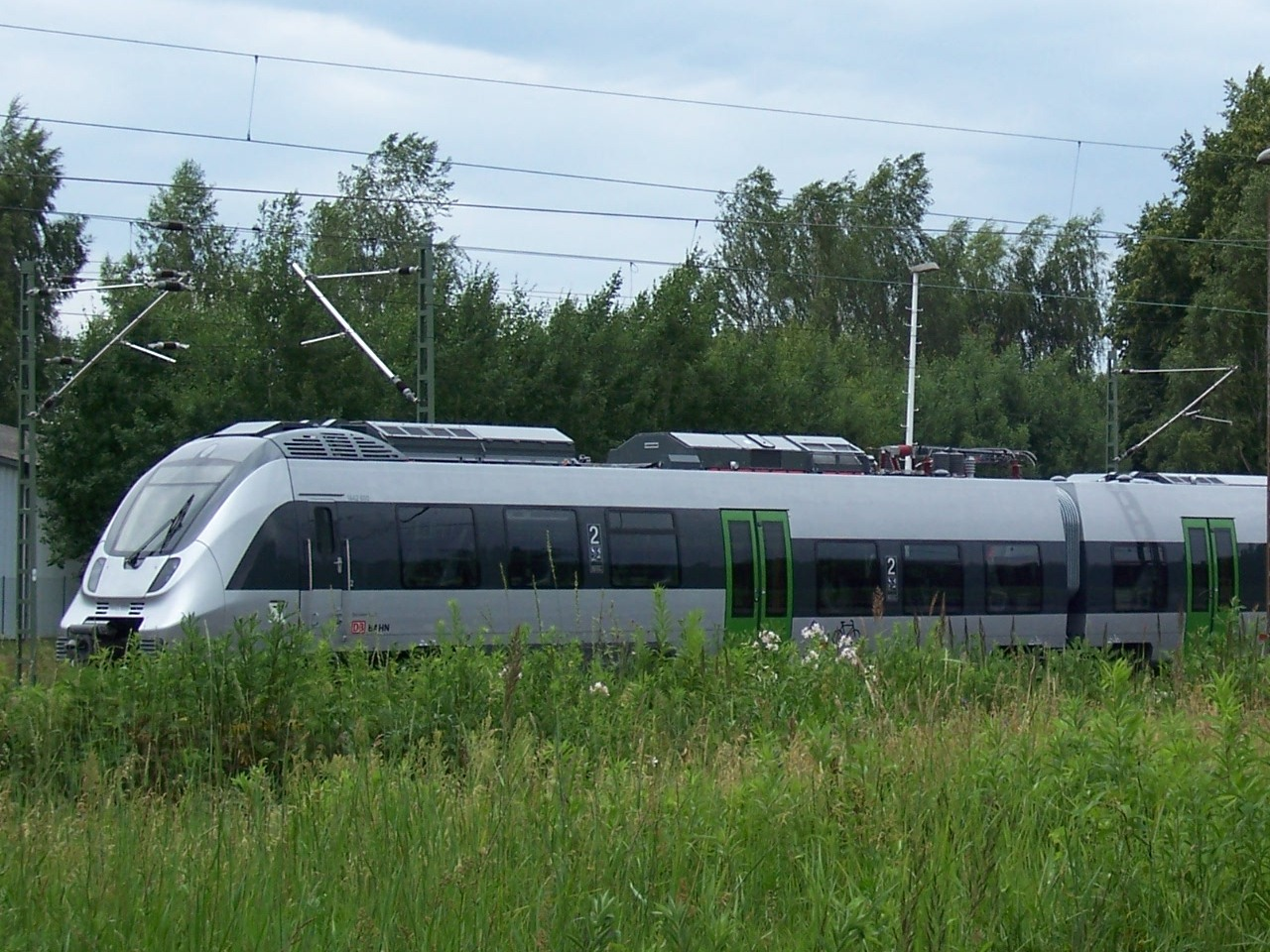
A Bombardier Talent 2 unit at the factory in Hennigsdorf, June 2012

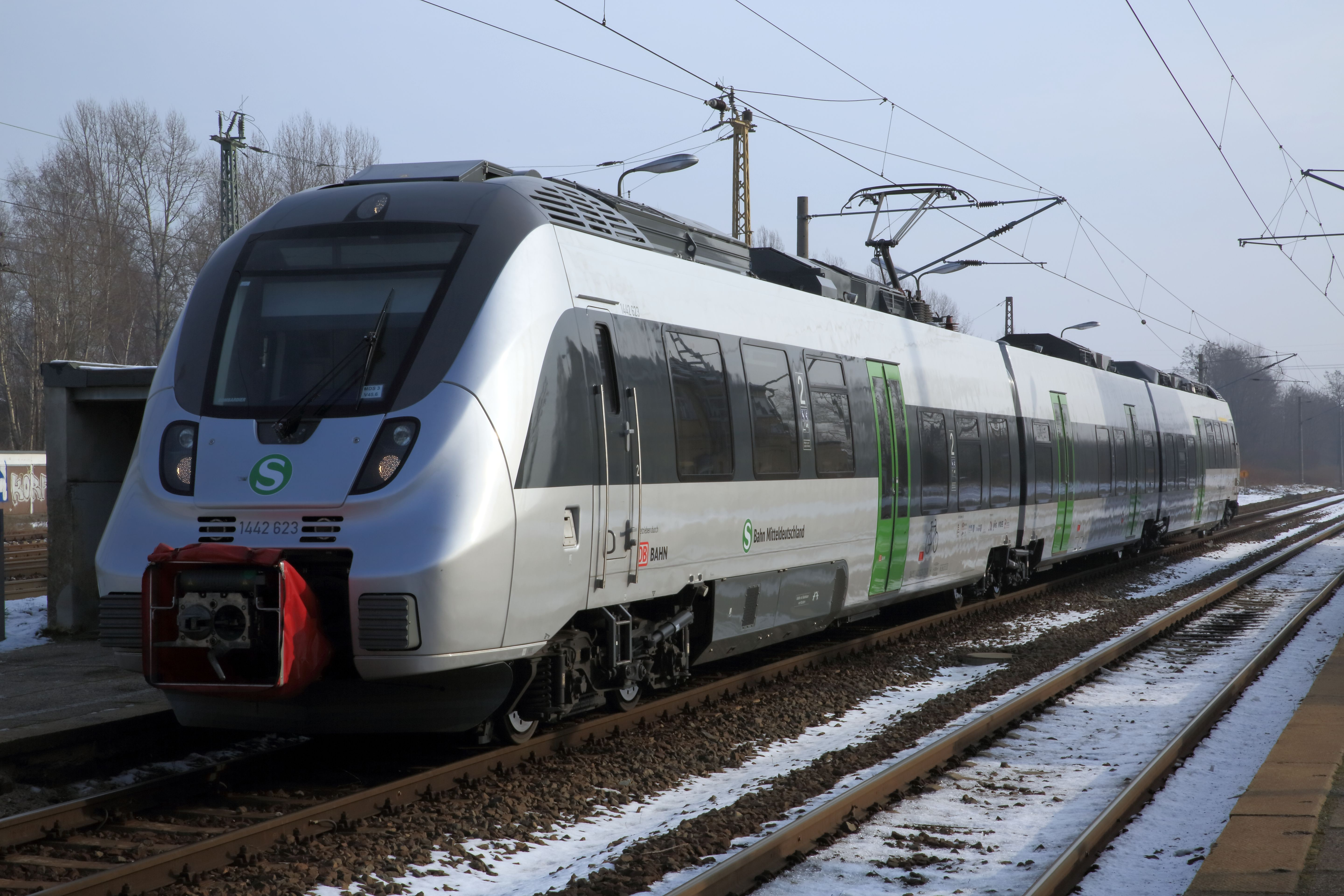
One of 50 short units (three sections) at Leipzig-Thekla

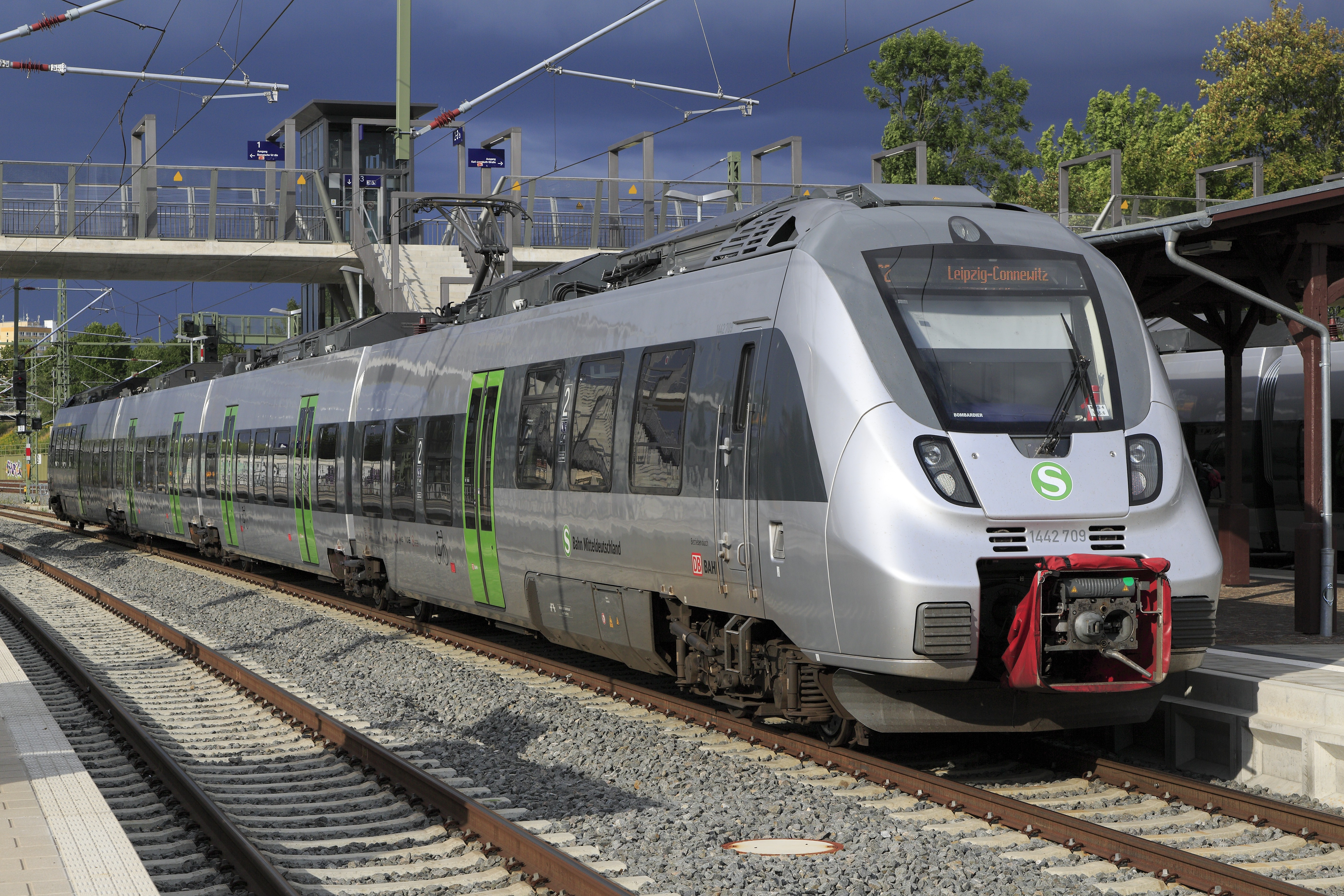
One of 15 long units (four sections) at Leipzig-Connewitz

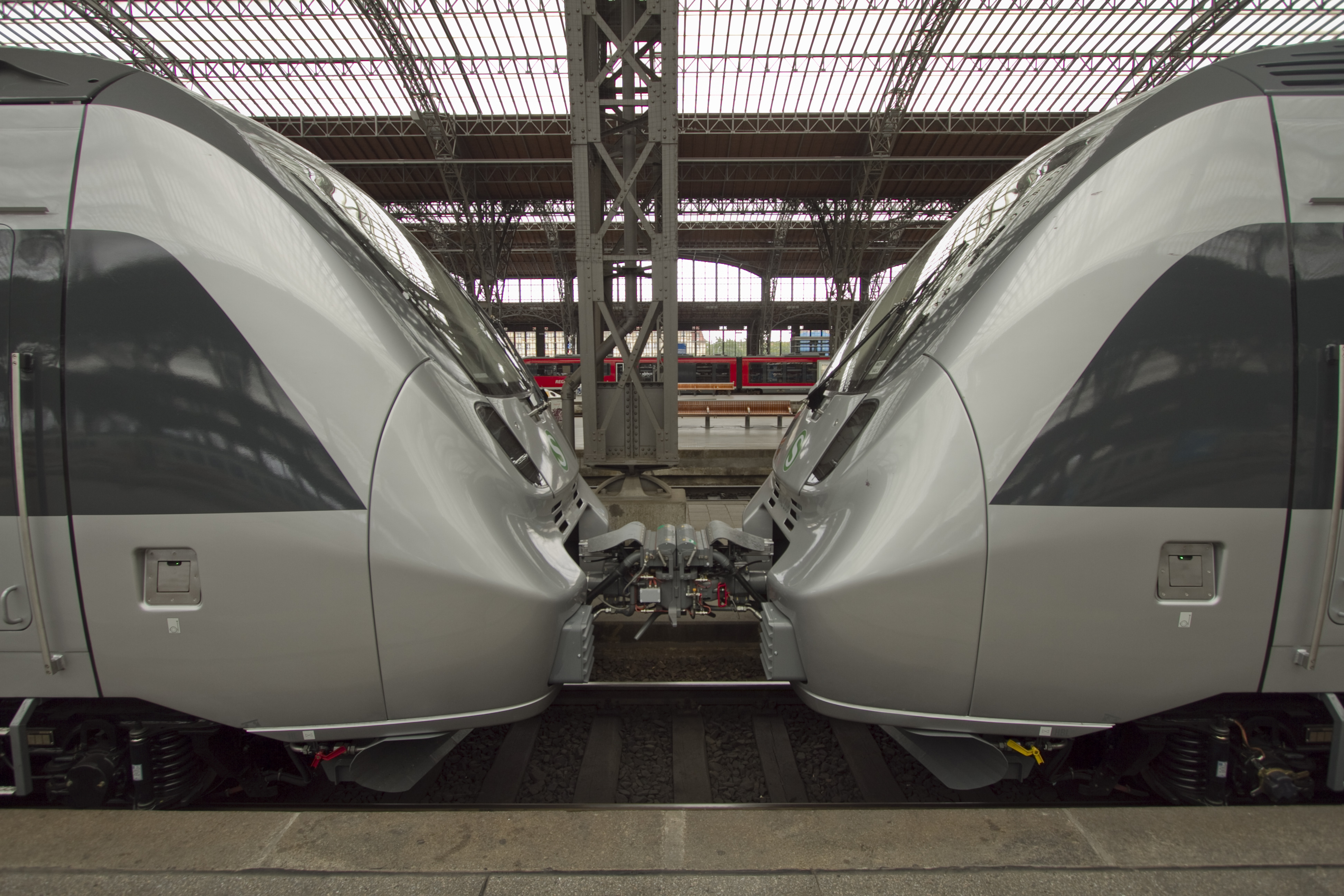
Coupling of two units at Leipzig Hauptbahnhof

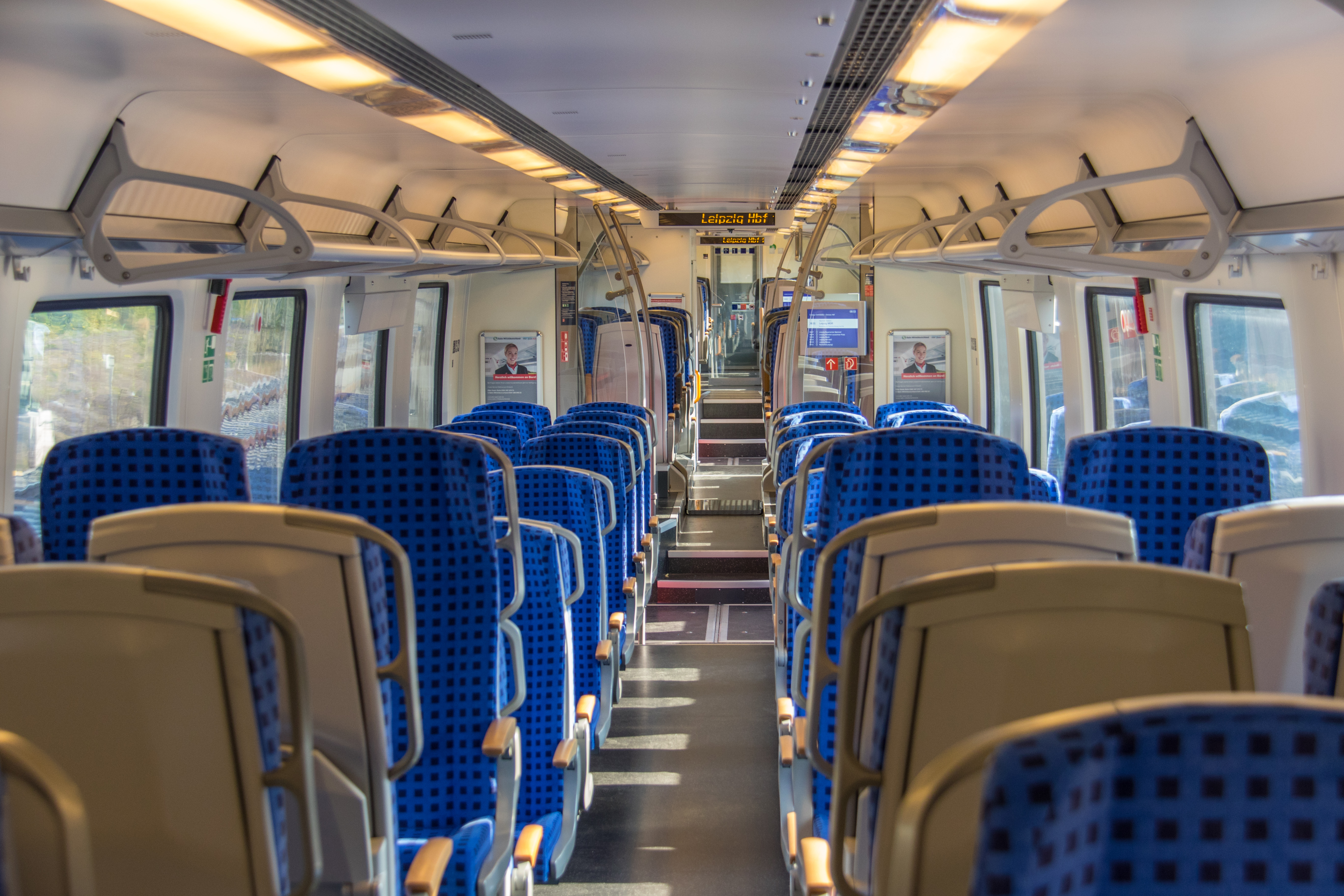
Inside view with seats

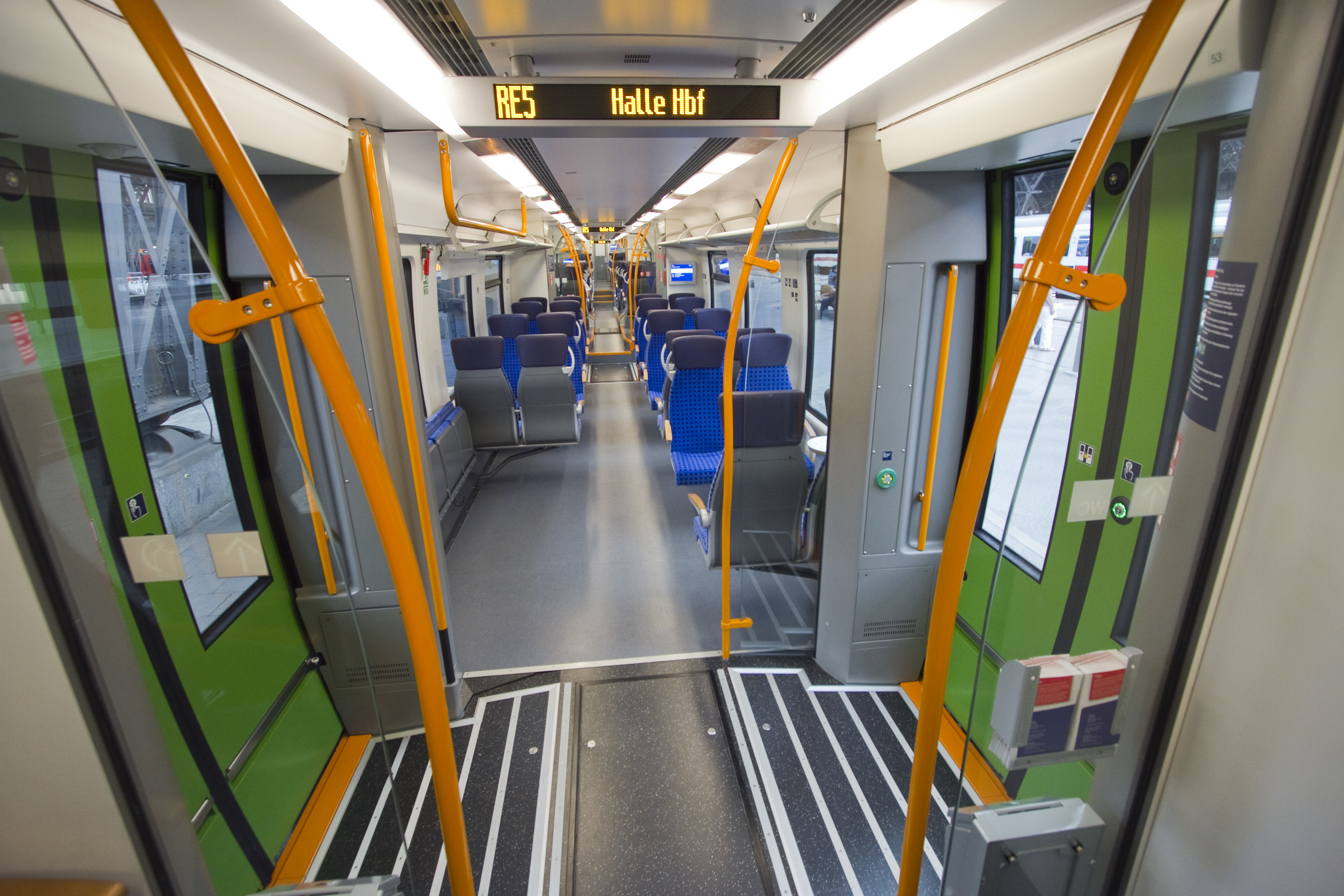
Inside view with doors

== See also ==
- Rail transport in Germany
