= Delitzsch oberer Bahnhof =

Railway stop in Delitzsch, Germany

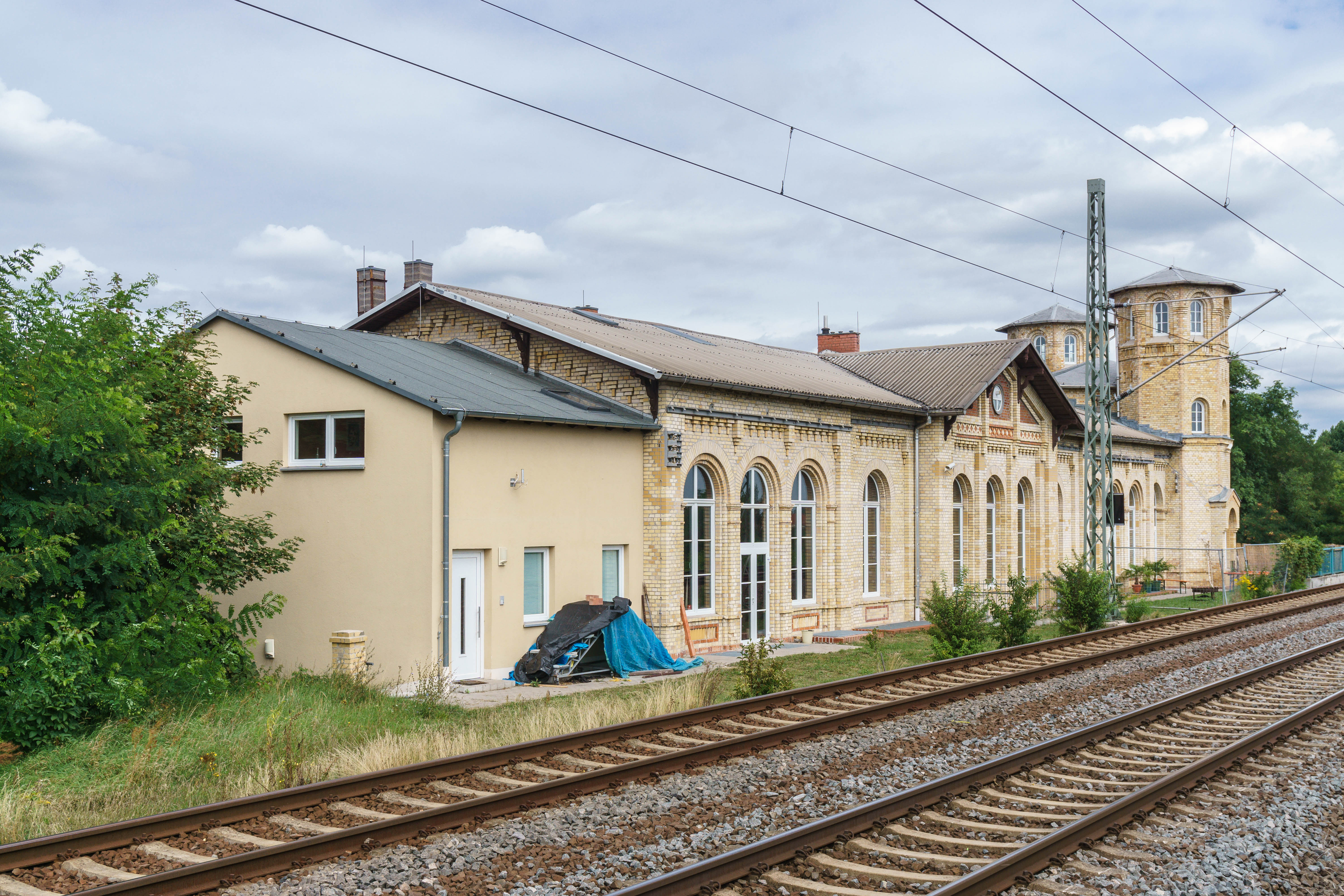
- Station building seen from the opposite platform

General information
- Location: Poetenweg 1, 04509 Delitzsch, Saxony; Germany
- Coordinates: 51°31′11″N 12°20′48″E
- System: Hp
- Owner: Deutsche Bahn
- Operator: DB Station&Service
- Line: Halle (Saale)–Eilenburg (km 26.8)
- Platforms: 2 side platforms
- Tracks: 2
- Connections: S 9; D

Construction
- Architectural style: Historicism

Other information
- Station code: 1155
- DS100 code: LDLO
- IBNR: 8080280
- Category: 6
- Fare zone: MDV: 165
- Website: www.bahnhof.de

History
- Opened: 1872; 154 years ago

Services
Preceding station	Mitteldeutschland S-Bahn	Following station
Kyhna towards Halle (Saale) Hbf	S 9	Hohenroda towards Eilenburg
Location
- Location within Saxony Location within Germany Location within Europe

Delitzsch oberer Bahnhof (Delitzsch upper station) is an intermediate station on the double-tracked and electrified Halle–Cottbus railway and one of the two passenger station serving the town of Delitzsch in the Nordsachsen district of Germany. It is currently only a halt with two side platforms.

== Geography ==
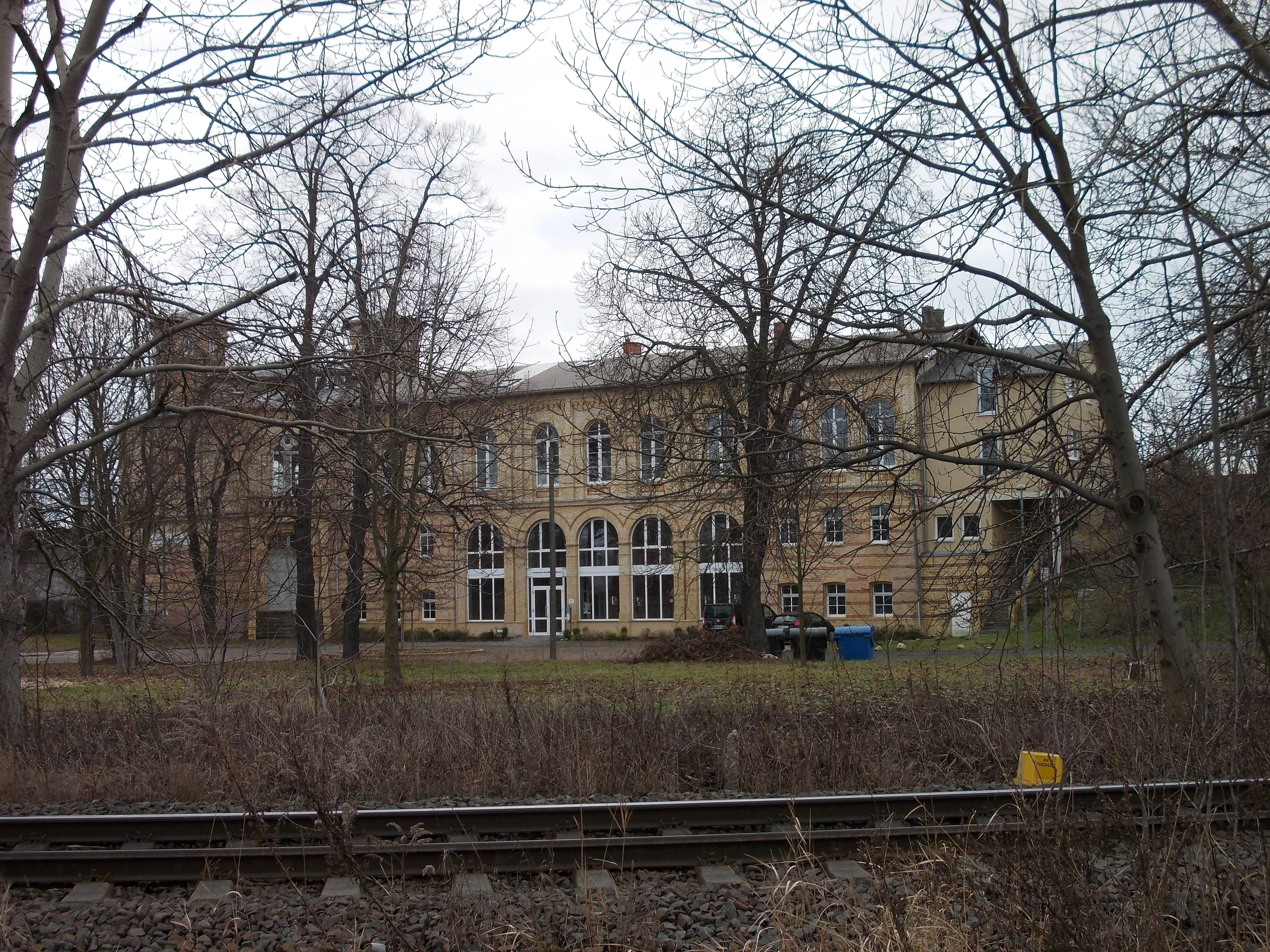
Station building and track connection between unterer Bahnhof and goods station

Delitzsch oberer Bahnhof is situated in the south-eastern part of the town centre, south of Anna-Zammert-Straße and north of Lindenweg and the suburb of Döbernitz. The railway crosses Poetenweg and the river Lober on bridges immediately west of the station.

A track connection between Delitzsch unterer Bahnhof and Delitzsch goods station passes north of the station building.

== History ==
The first station in Delitzsch was today's unterer Bahnhof, formerly Berliner Bahnhof on the Trebnitz–Leipzig railway, opened in 1859. The Halle-Sorau-Guben Railway Company opened the Halle–Cottbus railway in 1872, and with it the Sorauer Bahnhof which later became known as oberer Bahnhof. The station building was erected in the style of the Historicism, its entrance is located in the corner between the two railway lines which cross nearby.

Until 1945, the line through Delitzsch saw busy traffic between the industrial regions of Central German and Silesia. Fast and semi-fast trains were joined or split in Eilenburg, so that both Halle and Leipzig could be served directly. The Halle portions of the trains used to stop in Delitzsch oberer Bahnhof. In summer 1939, three semi-fast and two fast trains in each direction stopped here daily, and there were direct connections or through coaches to Breslau and Kassel.

After destructions by allied aerial attacks in April 1945, the station was rebuilt. Since Sorau had become part of Poland, Deutsche Reichsbahn renamed the station on 15 September 1951.

After the German unification in 1990, the station building fell out of use, and its condition deteriorated. It was rehabilitated in 2007/2008 and became the seat of Theaterakademie Sachsen, a professional school for acting and theatre pedagogy, as well as a cultural venue.

With the exception of the through tracks, most tracks were removed by Deutsche Bahn after 1994, leaving the station a halt.

From December 2008 to December 2015 trains were operated by Mitteldeutsche Regiobahn, a subsidiary of Transdev Germany.

== Services ==
In 2017, Delitzsch oberer Bahnhof is served by regional trains of line RB75 of Mitteldeutscher Verkehrsverbund, with trains in both direction stopping hourly during the time of operation from Monday to Friday, and every two hours on Saturdays and Sundays. Most trains are operated by Abellio Rail Mitteldeutschland, some by DB Regio, and most continue to and from Eisleben, some also to and from Sangerhausen or Nordhausen.
