= Leipzig-Thekla station =

Railway station in Leipzig, Germany

Leipzig-Thekla
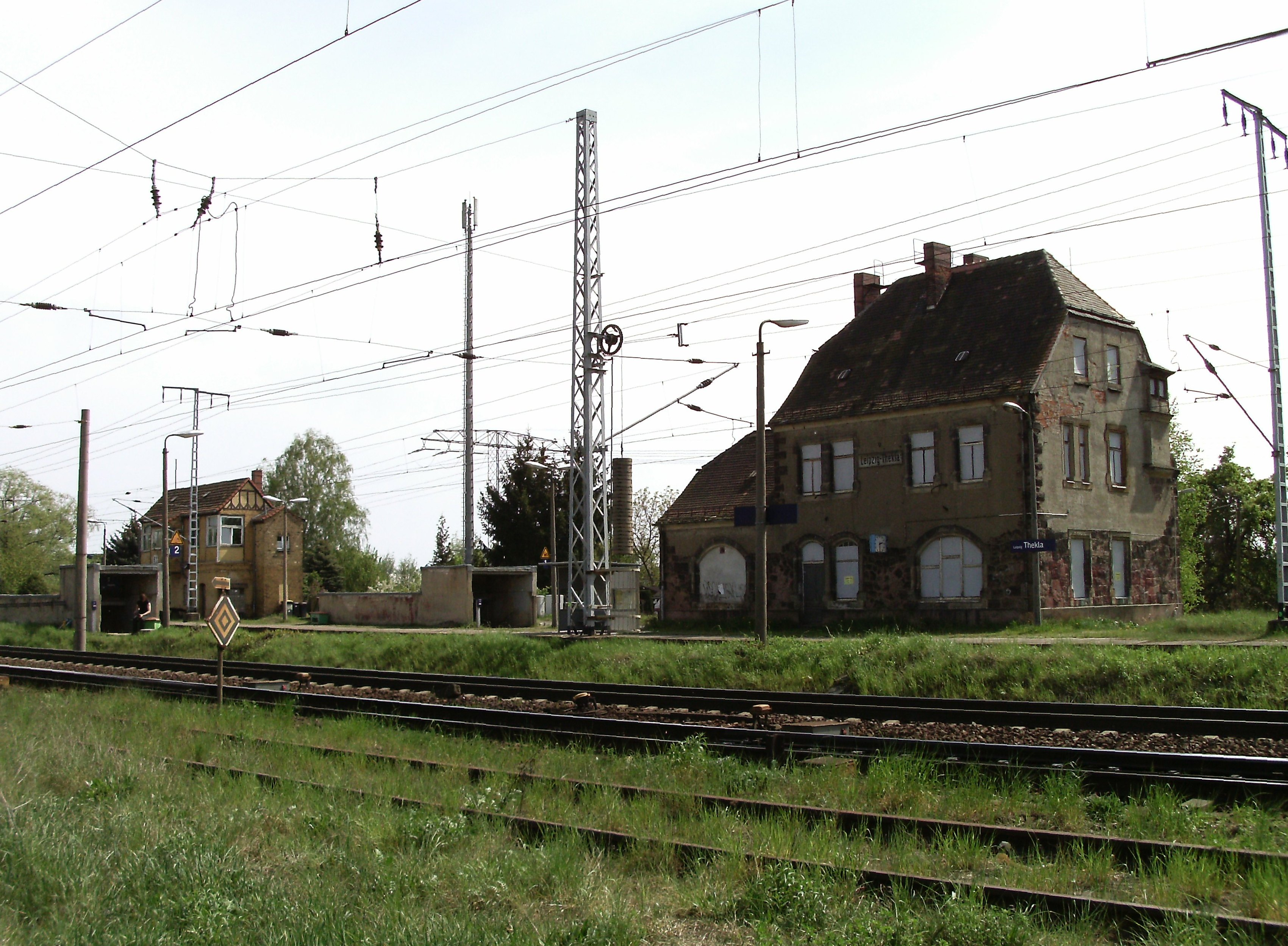
- Leipzig-Thekla railway station (2012)

General information
- Location: Leipzig, Saxony; Germany
- Coordinates: 51.2217°N 12.2551°E
- System: Bf
- Lines: Leipzig–Eilenburg railway; Leipzig-Wahren–Leipzig-Engelsdorf railway
- Platforms: 2

Other information
- Fare zone: MDV: 110

History
- Opened: 1 May 1906; 120 years ago
- Electrified: 1914-1914; 1921-1946; 17 October 1958; 67 years ago
- Former names: 1906-1931 Thekla
Location

Leipzig-Thekla (German: Bahnhof Leipzig-Thekla) is a railway station located in Leipzig, Germany. The station is located on the connection of Leipzig–Eilenburg railway and Leipzig-Wahren–Leipzig-Engelsdorf railway, part of the Leipzig Freight Ring. Passenger services are operated by DB Regio. Since December 2013 the station is served by the S-Bahn Mitteldeutschland.Leipzig-Thekla station features two platforms and serves the northern district of Thekla in Leipzig.

== Train services ==
The following services currently call at the station:

Preceding station	Mitteldeutschland S-Bahn	Following station
Leipzig-Heiterblick towards Falkenberg (Elster)	S 4	Leipzig Nord towards Markkleeberg-Gaschwitz
