= Eilenburg-West =

- Verwaltungsverband
- Interactive map of Eilenburg-West
- Location within Germany Location within Saxony
- Coordinates: 51°28′N 12°32′E
- Country: Germany
- State: Saxony
- District: Nordsachsen
- Seat: Eilenburg
- Subdivisions: 2 municipalities

Area
  - Total: 120.8 km^{2} (46.6 sq mi)

Population (2025-12-31)
  - Total: 5,900
  - Density: 49/km^{2} (130/sq mi)
- Time zone: UTC+01:00 (CET)
  - Summer (DST): UTC+02:00 (CEST)
- Website: www.eilenburg-west.de

Eilenburg-West is a Verwaltungsverband in the district Nordsachsen in Saxony, Germany. The seat of the Verwaltungsverband is in Eilenburg, itself not part of the Verwaltungsverband.

The Verwaltungsverband Eilenburg-West consists of the following municipalities:

1. Jesewitz
2. Zschepplin
