= Leipzig/Halle Airport station =

Railway station in Schkeuditz, Germany

Flughafen Leipzig/Halle
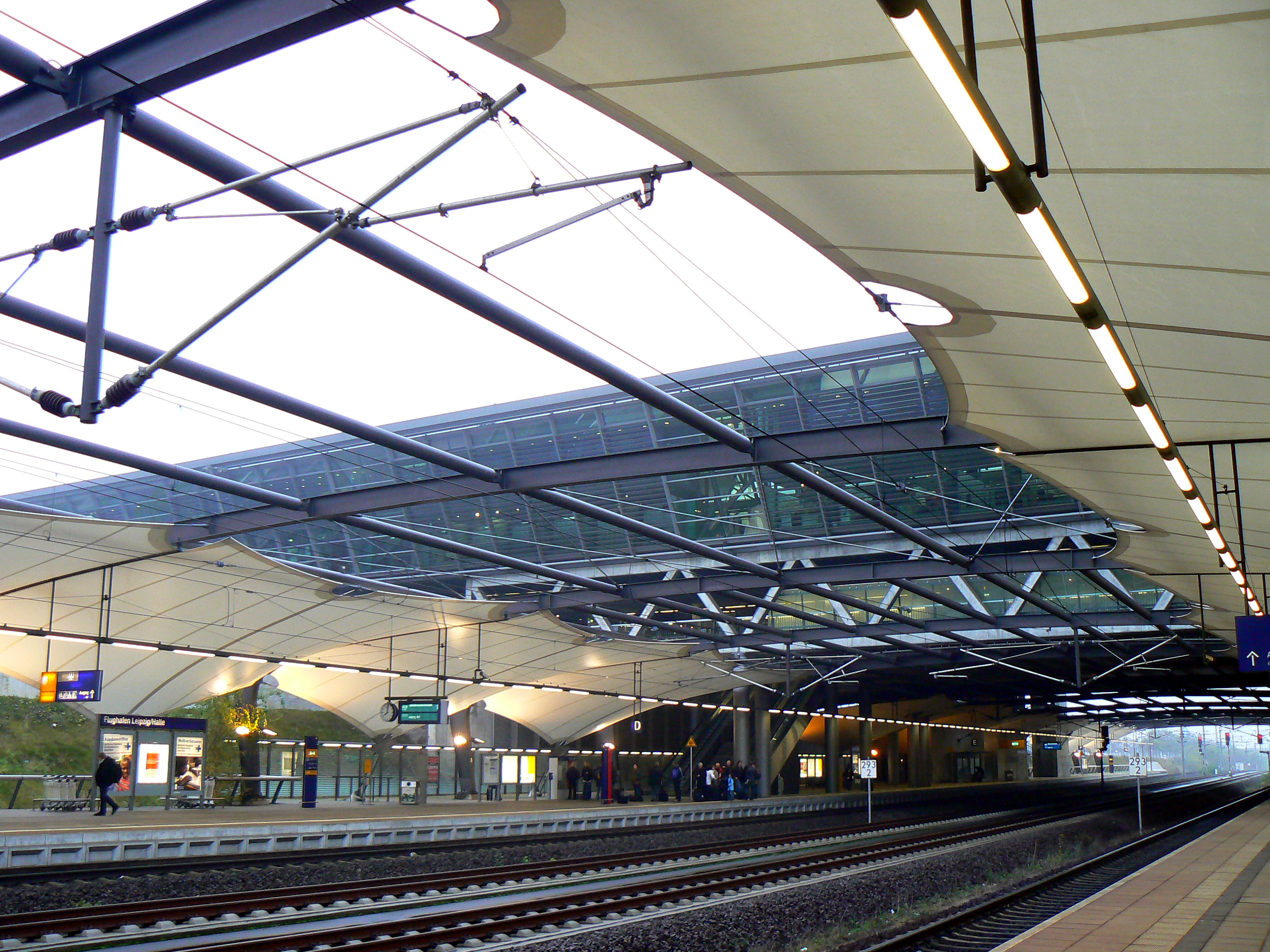
- Tracks of the station

General information
- Location: Am Flughafenbahnhof; 04435 Schkeuditz; Schkeuditz, Saxony; Germany
- Coordinates: 51°25′24″N 12°13′21″E
- Owner: DB Netz
- Operator: DB Station&Service
- Line: Erfurt–Leipzig/Halle high-speed railway
- Platforms: 2 side platforms
- Tracks: 4
- Train operators: DB Fernverkehr; S-Bahn Mitteldeutschland

Construction
- Parking: yes
- Cycle facilities: yes
- Accessible: yes

Other information
- Station code: 8015
- DS100 code: LFLU
- IBNR: 8012183
- Category: 4
- Fare zone: MDV: 163
- Website: www.bahnhof.de

History
- Opened: 30 June 2003; 23 years ago
- Electrified: at opening

Services
| Preceding station | DB Fernverkehr | Following station |
|---|---|---|
| Halle (Saale) Hbf towards Stuttgart Hbf | IC 55 | Leipzig Hbf towards Dresden Hbf |
| Preceding station | Mitteldeutschland S-Bahn | Following station |
| Halle (Saale) Hbf Terminus | S 5 | Leipzig Messe towards Zwickau Hbf |
| Halle (Saale) Hbf Terminus | S 5x | Leipzig Messe towards Zwickau Hbf |
Location
- Location within Saxony Location within Germany Location within Europe

Leipzig/Halle Airport (German: Bahnhof Flughafen Leipzig/Halle) is a railway station serving Leipzig/Halle Airport, located in Schkeuditz, Germany. The station was opened on 30 June 2003 and is located on the Erfurt–Leipzig/Halle high-speed railway. The train services are operated by Deutsche Bahn.

Since December 2013 the station is served by the S-Bahn Mitteldeutschland.

== Train services ==
DB Fernverkehr and S-Bahn Mitteldeutschland services currently call at the station.

== See also ==
- Rail transport in Germany
- Railway stations in Germany
