= Halle-Trotha station =

Railway station in Halle (Saale), Germany

Halle Trotha
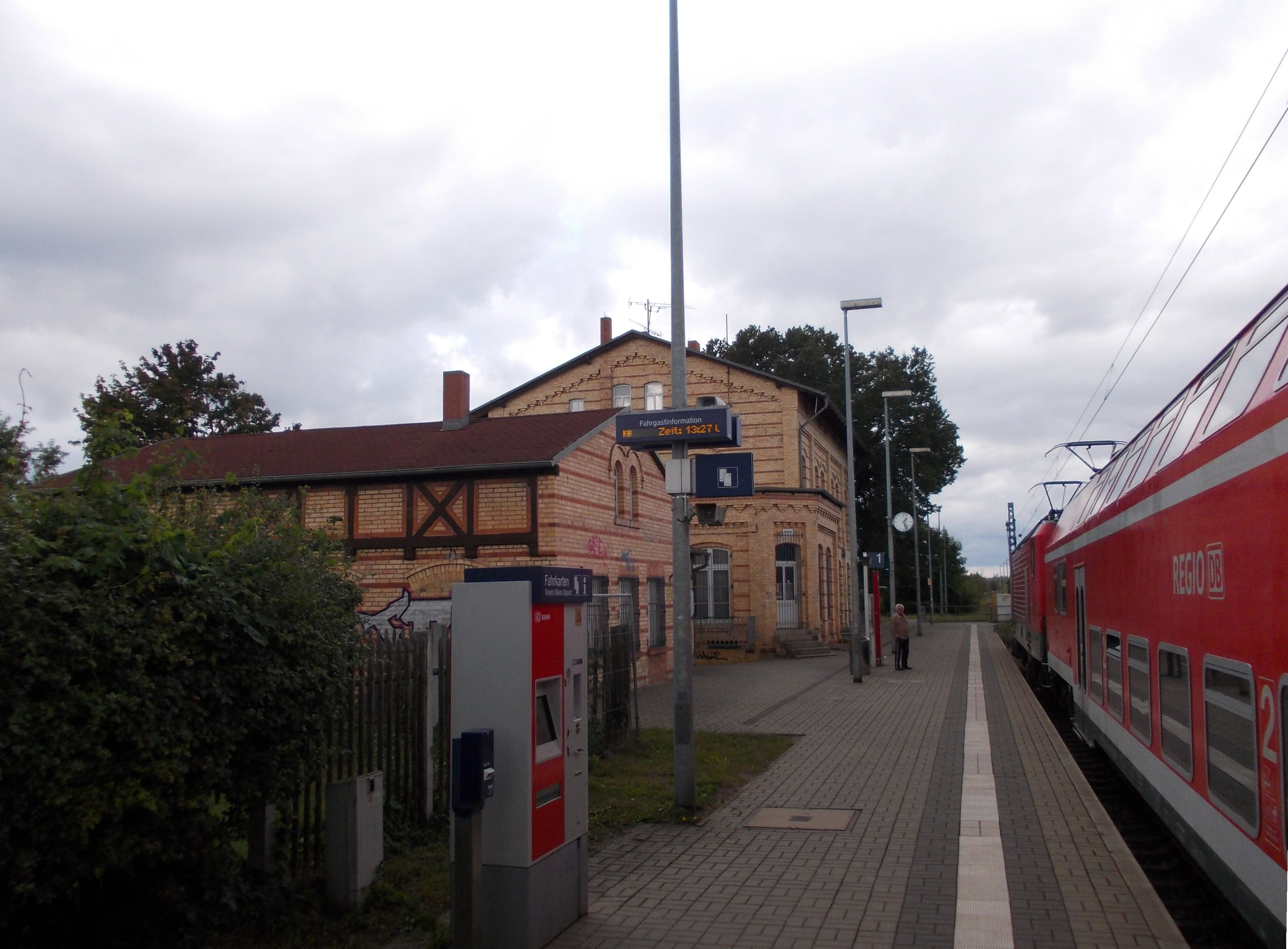
- 2012

General information
- Location: Hans-Dittmar-Straße; 06118 Halle (Saale); Saxony-Anhalt, Germany
- Coordinates: 51.524°N 11.962°E
- Elevation: 83 m (272 ft)
- Owner: Deutsche Bahn
- Operator: DB Netz; DB Station&Service
- Lines: Halle–Vienenburg railway (KBS 330); Halle-Trotha Port Railway
- Platforms: 2 side platforms
- Tracks: 3
- Train operators: Abellio Rail Mitteldeutschland; S-Bahn Mitteldeutschland
- Connections: 25

Construction
- Parking: yes
- Cycle facilities: yes
- Accessible: yes

Other information
- Station code: 2505
- DS100 code: LHT
- IBNR: 8011814
- Category: 6
- Fare zone: MDV: 210
- Website: www.bahnhof.de

History
- Opened: 1 October 1872; 153 years ago

Services
Preceding station	Abellio Rail Mitteldeutschland	Following station
Teicha towards Magdeburg Hbf	RB 47	Halle Wohnstadt Nord towards Halle (Saale) Hbf
Preceding station	Mitteldeutschland S-Bahn	Following station
Terminus	S 3	Halle Wohnstadt Nord towards Wurzen or Oschatz
Location

Halle-Trotha station (German: Bahnhof Halle-Trotha) is a railway station in the municipality of Halle (Saale), located in Saxony-Anhalt, Germany.
