= Leipzig Nord station =

Railway halt in Leipzig, Germany

Leipzig Nord
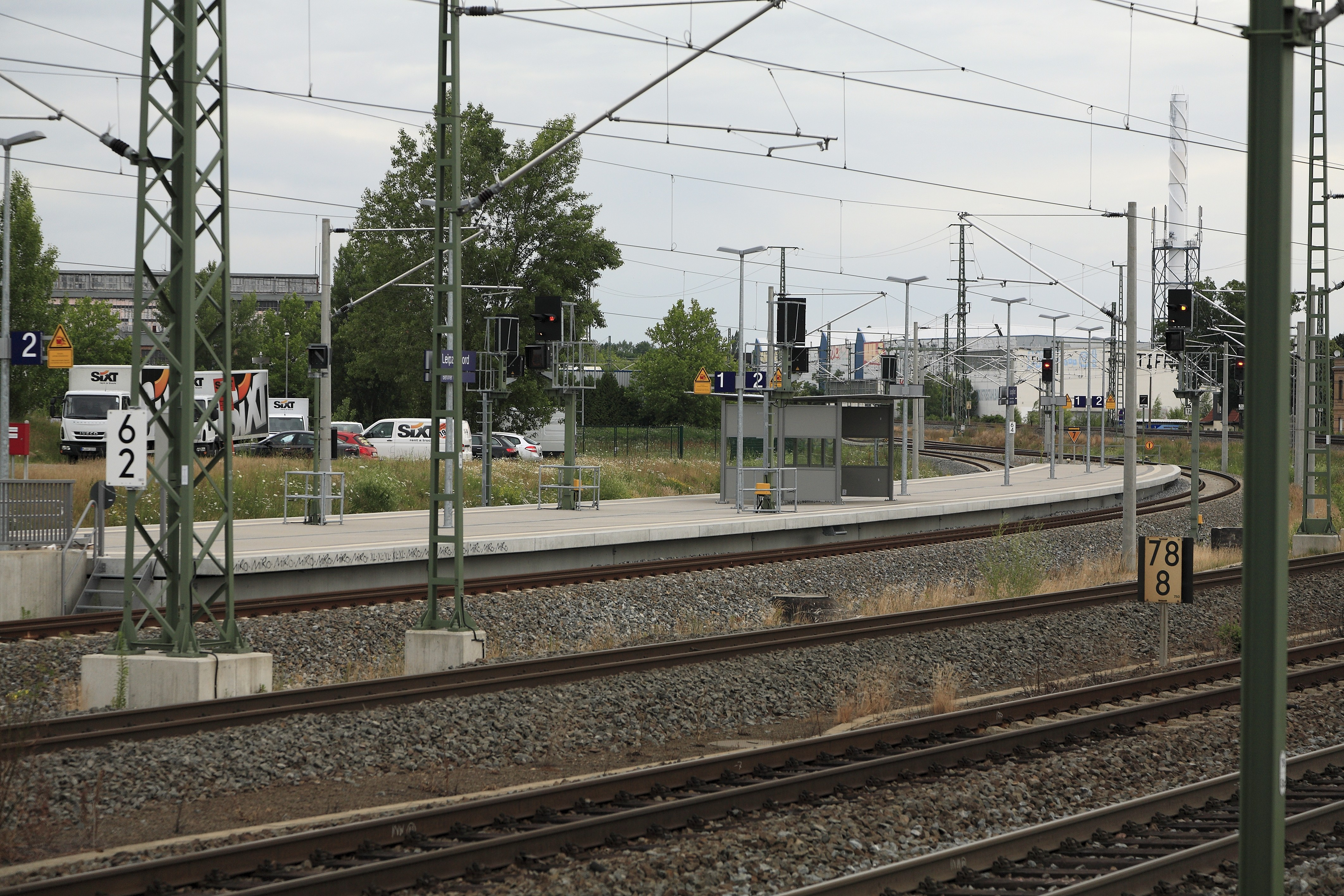
- Leipzig Nord station in 2012 before opening

General information
- Location: Leipzig, Saxony; Germany
- Coordinates: 51.364453°N 12.4011213°E
- Lines: Dessau–Leipzig railway; Leipzig–Eilenburg railway
- Platforms: 2

Other information
- Station code: 8275
- DS100 code: LLN
- Category: 6
- Fare zone: MDV: 110

History
- Opened: 15 December 2013; 12 years ago
- Electrified: at opening
Location

Leipzig Nord (German: Haltepunkt Leipzig Nord) is a railway station located in Leipzig, Germany. The station opened on 15 December 2013 and is located on the Dessau-Leipzig railway. Train services are operated by Deutsche Bahn, as part of the S-Bahn Mitteldeutschland.

== Train services ==
The following services currently call at the station:

Preceding station	Mitteldeutschland S-Bahn	Following station
Leipzig Essener Straße towards Dessau Hbf or Lutherstadt Wittenberg Hbf	S 2	Leipzig Hbf towards Leipzig-Stötteritz
Leipzig Mockauer Straße towards Falkenberg (Elster)	S 4	Leipzig Hbf towards Markkleeberg-Gaschwitz
Leipzig Essener Straße towards Leipzig Messe	S 6	Leipzig Hbf towards Geithain

== Tram services ==
- 1
- 9
