= Delitzsch unterer Bahnhof =

Railway station in Delitzsch, Germany

Delitzsch unt Bf
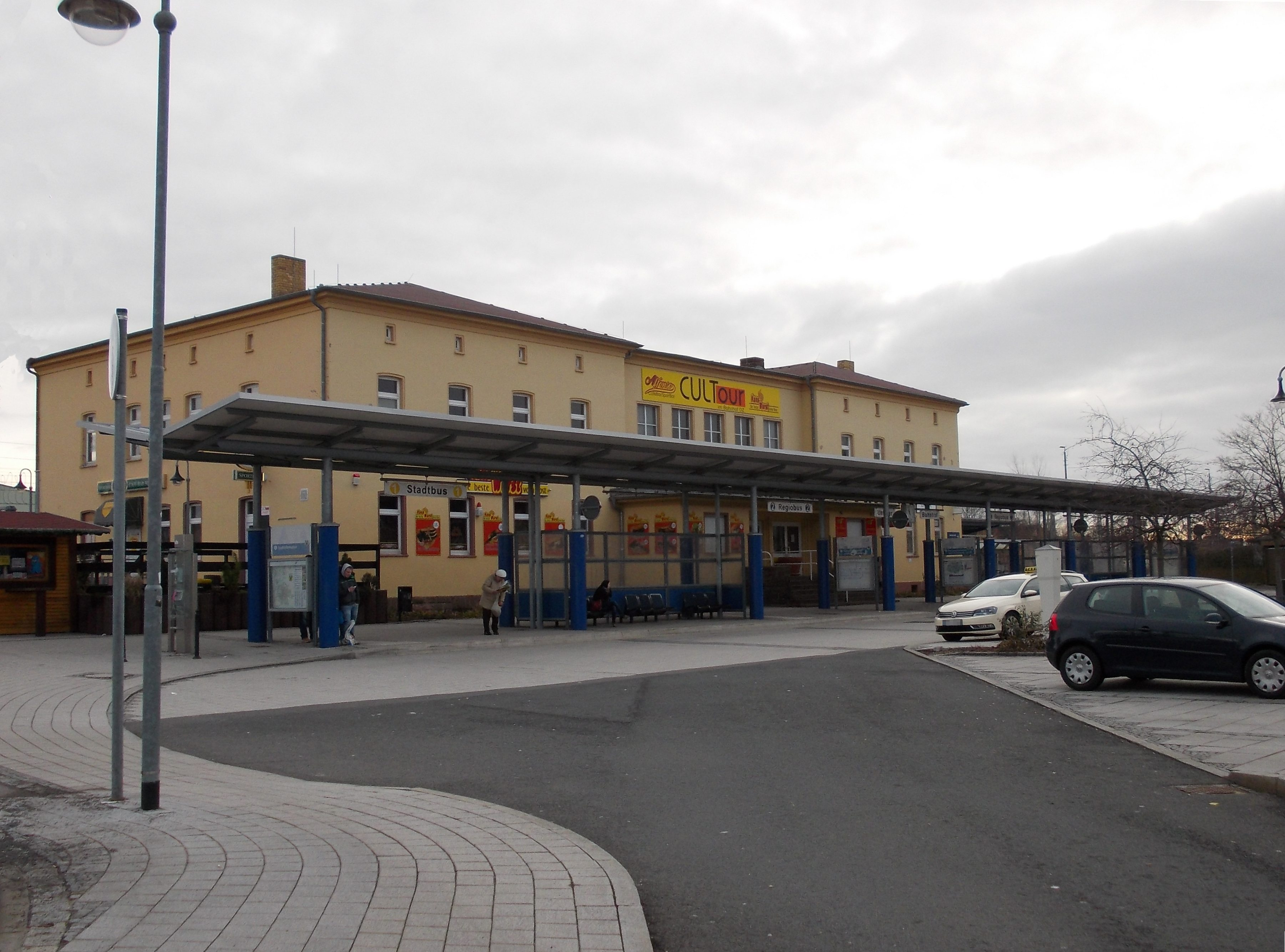
- Entrance building and bus stop

General information
- Location: Eisenbahnstr. 14, Delitzsch, Saxony; Germany
- Coordinates: 51°31′27″N 12°20′43″E
- Owner: Deutsche Bahn
- Operator: DB Station&Service
- Lines: Trebnitz–Leipzig (km 60.40); Delitzscher Kleinbahn (km 37.30; closed)
- Platforms: 3

Construction
- Accessible: Yes

Other information
- Station code: 1156
- DS100 code: LDL
- IBNR: 8010076
- Category: 4
- Fare zone: MDV: 165
- Website: www.bahnhof.de

History
- Opened: 1 February 1859; 167 years ago
- Electrified: 1913-1914 (Note: Since 1915 catenaries were dismantled to gain copper for war production.); 1921-1946 (Note: Since 1946 catenaries and overhead line masts were dismantled as Soviet war reparations.); 9 June 1958; 68 years ago
- Former names: 1859-1952 Berliner Bahnhof

Passengers
- 2,500 – 5,000

Services
Preceding station	DB Regio Südost	Following station
Bitterfeld towards Magdeburg Hbf	RE 13	Leipzig Messe towards Leipzig Hbf
Preceding station	Mitteldeutschland S-Bahn	Following station
Petersroda towards Dessau Hbf or Lutherstadt Wittenberg Hbf	S 2	Zschortau towards Leipzig-Stötteritz
Location
- Location within Saxony Location within Germany Location within Europe

Delitzsch unterer Bahnhof (lower station) (abbreviated as Delitzsch unt Bf) is one of two railway stations in the town of Delitzsch in the German state of Saxony. It has an average of 2,500 to 5,000 passengers per day.

== Location ==
The station complex is located in the eastern part of the town. The station building is on Eisenbahnstraße (railway street), with the extended east-west axis of Eilenburger Straße connecting the station to the city centre. The boundary of the station precinct is defined to the north by the station promenade, to the south by Bismarckstraße and to the east by Berliner Straße.

There are commuter parking lots on Eisenbahnstraße where it connects with the federal highway 183a to the north of the station and to the north-west and the south-west of the entrance building. Also located on Eisenbahnstraße is a bus station for regional and city bus lines operated by Auto Webel GmbH and Omnibusverkehr Leupold and a taxi rank.

Northeast of the station is the site of the former Deutsche Reichsbahn Delitzsch coach repair shop, now used a workshop of EuroMaint Rail for the repair of coaches.

== History ==
The commissioning of the (Berlin–) Bitterfeld–Leipzig railway, including the “lower station”, in 1859 connected Delitzsch with the national railway.

The station area once belonged to the municipality of Grünstraße and was located at the time of its establishment on the outskirts of the city. The municipality and the station were incorporated in Delitzsch in 1862.

The station was destroyed by allied air raids in April 1945. Only the outer walls of the entrance building remained standing. It was reconstructed from 1950 to 1955.

Extensive work was carried out from 1991 to 1993 at the station and on the Bitterfeld–Delitzsch and Delitzsch–Zschortau railways as part of the German Unity Transport Project (Verkehrsprojekt Deutsche Einheit): 8.3 (upgrading of the Berlin–Leipzig/Halle line). Thus the platform next to the entrance building and the island platform and an approximately 40 metre-long pedestrian tunnel were completely rebuilt. The introduction of a new train control system south of Delitzsch from the mid-1990s allows trains to run at 160 km/h between Bitterfeld and Zschortau. With the commissioning of the Leipzig City Tunnel in December 2013, the station was integrated into the new network of S-Bahn Mitteldeutschland.

== Transport services ==
Delitzsch unterer Bahnhof has rail connections to Leipzig and north to Bitterfeld and Dessau.

Line	Route	Frequency (min)
RE 13	Leipzig – Delitzsch – Bitterfeld – Dessau – Zerbst – Biederitz – Magdeburg	120
S 2	Markkleeberg-Gaschwitz – Leipzig-Connewitz – Leipzig Markt – Leipzig Hbf (low level) – Delitzsch – Bitterfeld – Dessau Hauptbahnhof	30 (towards Leipzig); 60 (towards Dessau)

The bus station at Delitzsch unterer Bahnhof offers connections to Bad Düben, Leipzig Sachsenpark, Leipzig/Halle Airport and Schkeuditz.

Line	Route since 1 October 2013	Operating days	Operator
192	Delitzsch – Lemsel – Rackwitz – Leipzig Sachsenpark	Monday–Friday	Auto Webel
203	Delitzsch – Zaasch – Zschernitz – Kyhna	Monday–Friday	Auto Webel
204	Delitzsch – Sausedlitz – Reibitz – Badrina – Löbnitz – Roitzschjora	Monday–Friday	Auto Webel
205	Delitzsch – Werben – Benndorf – Schenkenberg – Delitzsch and return	Monday–Friday	Auto Webel
206	Delitzsch – Zwochau – Wiedemar – Glesien – Radefeld	Monday–Sunday	Auto Webel
207	Delitzsch – Radefeld – Schkeuditz	Monday–Friday	Auto Webel
209	Delitzsch – Kyhna – Klitschmar – Zwochau – Glesien	Monday–Friday	Auto Webel
CityBus A	Delitzsch: Unterer Bahnhof – Delitzsch Nord – Unterer Bahnhof	Monday–Saturday	Auto Webel
CityBus B	Delitzsch: Unterer Bahnhof – Delitzsch Ost – Unterer Bahnhof – Auto-Webel – Landratsamt – Unterer Bahnhof	Monday–Saturday	Auto Webel
210	Delitzsch – Tiefensee – Bad Düben	Monday–Friday	Omnibusverkehr Leupold OHG
211	Delitzsch – Zschortau – Rackwitz	Monday–Friday	Omnibusverkehr Leupold OHG
212	Delitzsch – Krostitz – Eilenburg	Monday–Friday	Omnibusverkehr Leupold OHG
213	Delitzsch – Wölkau – Krostitz	Monday–Friday	Omnibusverkehr Leupold OHG
D Stadtverkehr	Delitzsch: PEP-Markt – Unterer Bahnhof – Beerendorf	Monday–Friday	Omnibusverkehr Leupold OHG
