= Jesewitz =

- Municipality
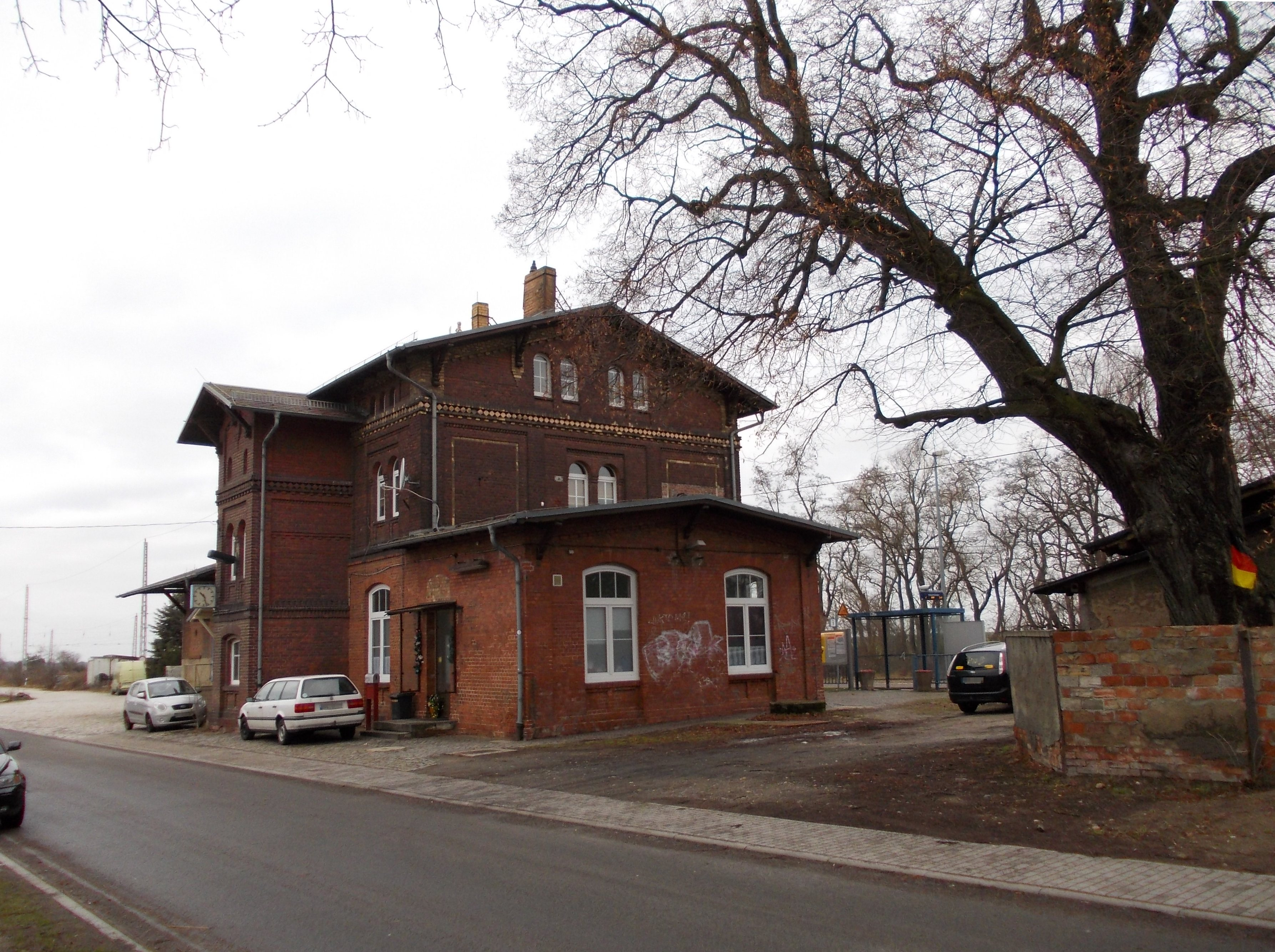
- Jesewitz railway station

- Coat of arms

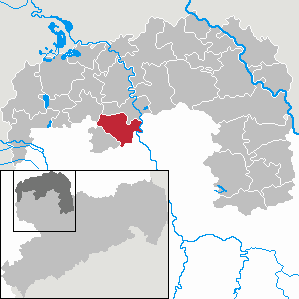
- Location of Jesewitz within Nordsachsen district
- Interactive map of Jesewitz
- Location within Germany Location within Saxony
- Coordinates: 51°25′20″N 12°33′45″E
- Country: Germany
- State: Saxony
- District: Nordsachsen
- Municipal assoc.: Eilenburg-West
- Subdivisions: 15

Government
  - Mayor (2022–29): Ralf Tauchnitz (Ind.)

Area
  - Total: 52.27 km^{2} (20.18 sq mi)
- Elevation: 139 m (456 ft)

Population (2025-12-31)
  - Total: 3,050
  - Density: 58.4/km^{2} (151/sq mi)
- Time zone: UTC+01:00 (CET)
  - Summer (DST): UTC+02:00 (CEST)
- Postal codes: 04838
- Dialling codes: 034241
- Vehicle registration: TDO, DZ, EB, OZ, TG, TO
- Website: www.jesewitz.de

Jesewitz is a municipality in the district of Nordsachsen, in Saxony, Germany. The area of Jesewitz is 52.27 km² with a population of 3,090 (as of December 31, 2020).

== Geography and transportation ==
Jesewitz district is approximately 15 kilometers north-east of Leipzig and 5 kilometers south-west of Eilenburg. The national roads B107 and B87 and the Leipzig–Cottbus railway pass through the district. The district is bordered by the town of Taucha to the west and to the east by the Mulde.
