= Zschepplin =

- Municipality
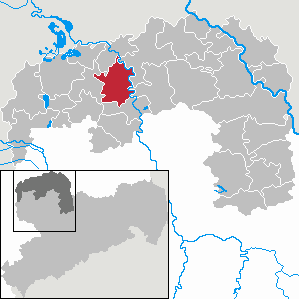
- Location of Zschepplin within Nordsachsen district
- Interactive map of Zschepplin
- Location within Germany Location within Saxony
- Coordinates: 51°30′N 12°36′E
- Country: Germany
- State: Saxony
- District: Nordsachsen
- Municipal assoc.: Eilenburg-West
- Subdivisions: 10

Government
  - Mayor (2020–27): Kay Kunath

Area
  - Total: 68.36 km^{2} (26.39 sq mi)
- Elevation: 103 m (338 ft)

Population (2025-12-31)
  - Total: 2,850
  - Density: 41.7/km^{2} (108/sq mi)
- Time zone: UTC+01:00 (CET)
  - Summer (DST): UTC+02:00 (CEST)
- Postal codes: 04838
- Dialling codes: 03423
- Vehicle registration: TDO, DZ, EB, OZ, TG, TO

Zschepplin (German pronunciation: [tʃɛpˈliːn]) is a municipality in the district of Nordsachsen, in Saxony, Germany.

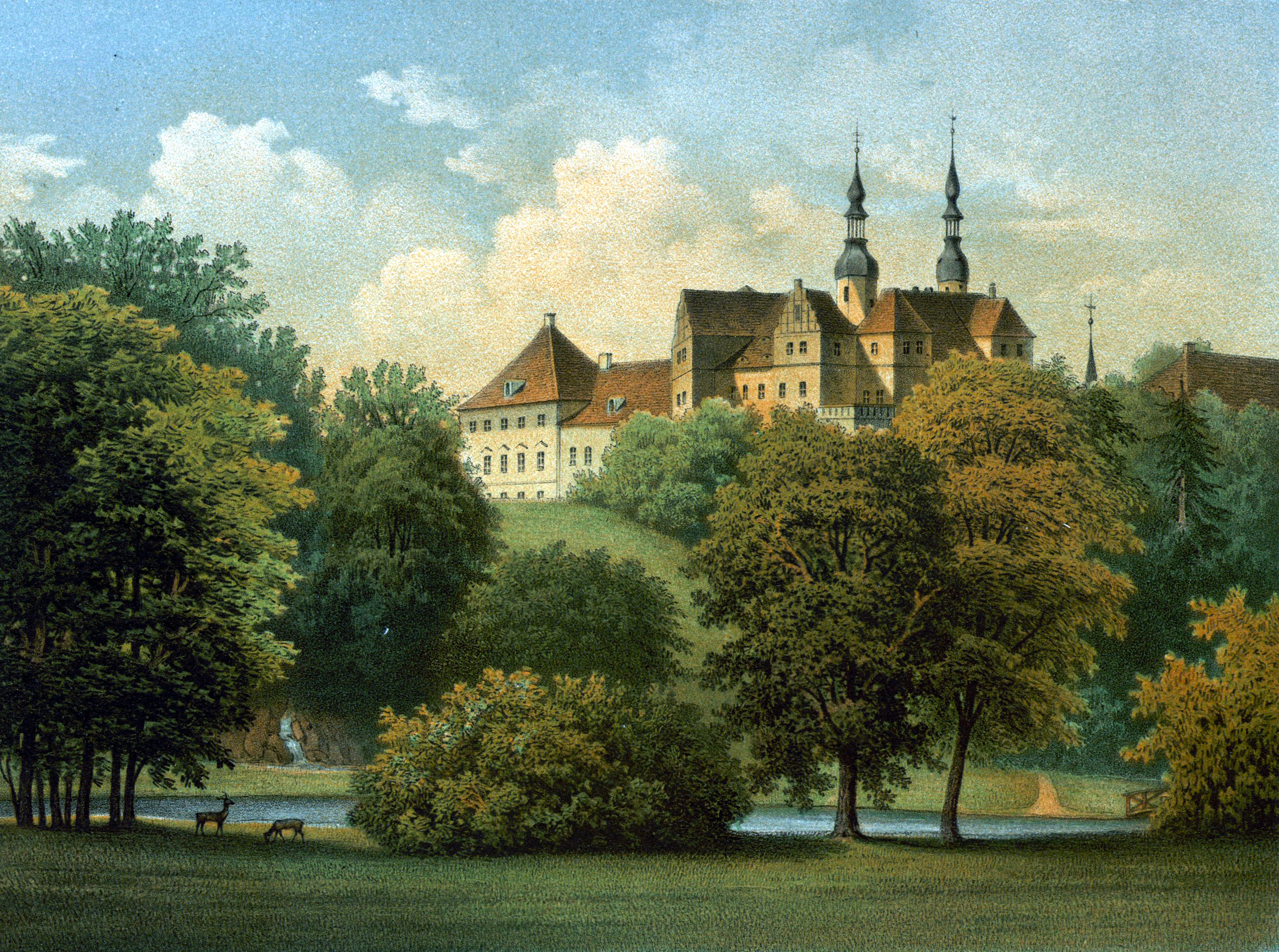
Palace Zschepplin around 1860, Edition by Alexander Duncker
