= Leipzig-Leutzsch station =

Railway station in Leipzig, Germany

Leipzig Leutzsch
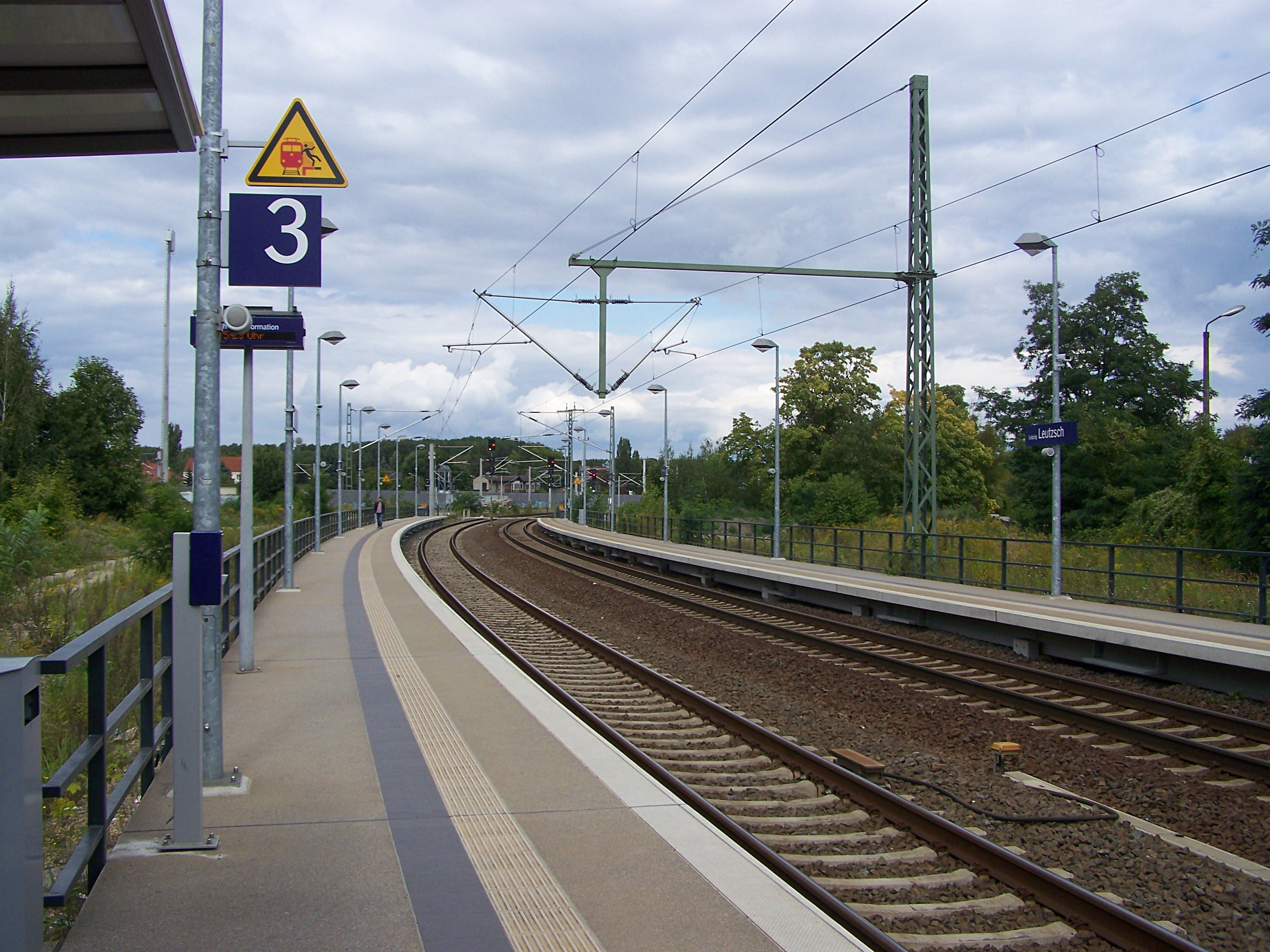
- Leipzig-Leutzsch station in 2014

General information
- Location: Leipzig, Saxony; Germany
- Coordinates: 51°21′11″N 12°18′13″E
- Lines: Leipzig–Großkorbetha railway; Leipzig–Probstzella railway
- Platforms: 4

Other information
- Station code: 3642
- Category: 6
- Fare zone: MDV: 110

History
- Opened: 22 March 1856; 170 years ago
- Electrified: 1942–1946 (Note: Since 1946 catenaries and overhead line masts were dismantled as Soviet war reparations.); 26 May 1963; 63 years ago
- Former names: 1856–1885 Barneck; 1885–1922 Leutzsch

Services
Preceding station	Abellio Rail Mitteldeutschland	Following station
Leipzig-Rückmarsdorf towards Eisenach	RB 20	Leipzig-Möckern towards Leipzig Hbf
Preceding station	Mitteldeutschland S-Bahn	Following station
Leipzig-Lindenau towards Leipzig Miltitzer Allee	S 1	Leipzig-Möckern towards Leipzig-Stötteritz
Location
- Location within Saxony

Leipzig-Leutzsch (German: Bahnhof Leipzig-Leutzsch) is a railway station located in Leipzig, Germany. The station is located on the junction of the Leipzig–Großkorbetha railway and Leipzig–Probstzella railway. The train services are operated by Deutsche Bahn. Since December 2013 the station has been served by the S-Bahn Mitteldeutschland.

The railway station underwent major renovations in 2008, when a new entrance was built on Georg-Schwarz-Straße, along with three new 140 m platforms. The old station building is located further north-east, on Am Ritterschlößchen, opposite the intersection with Am Sportpark.

== Gallery ==
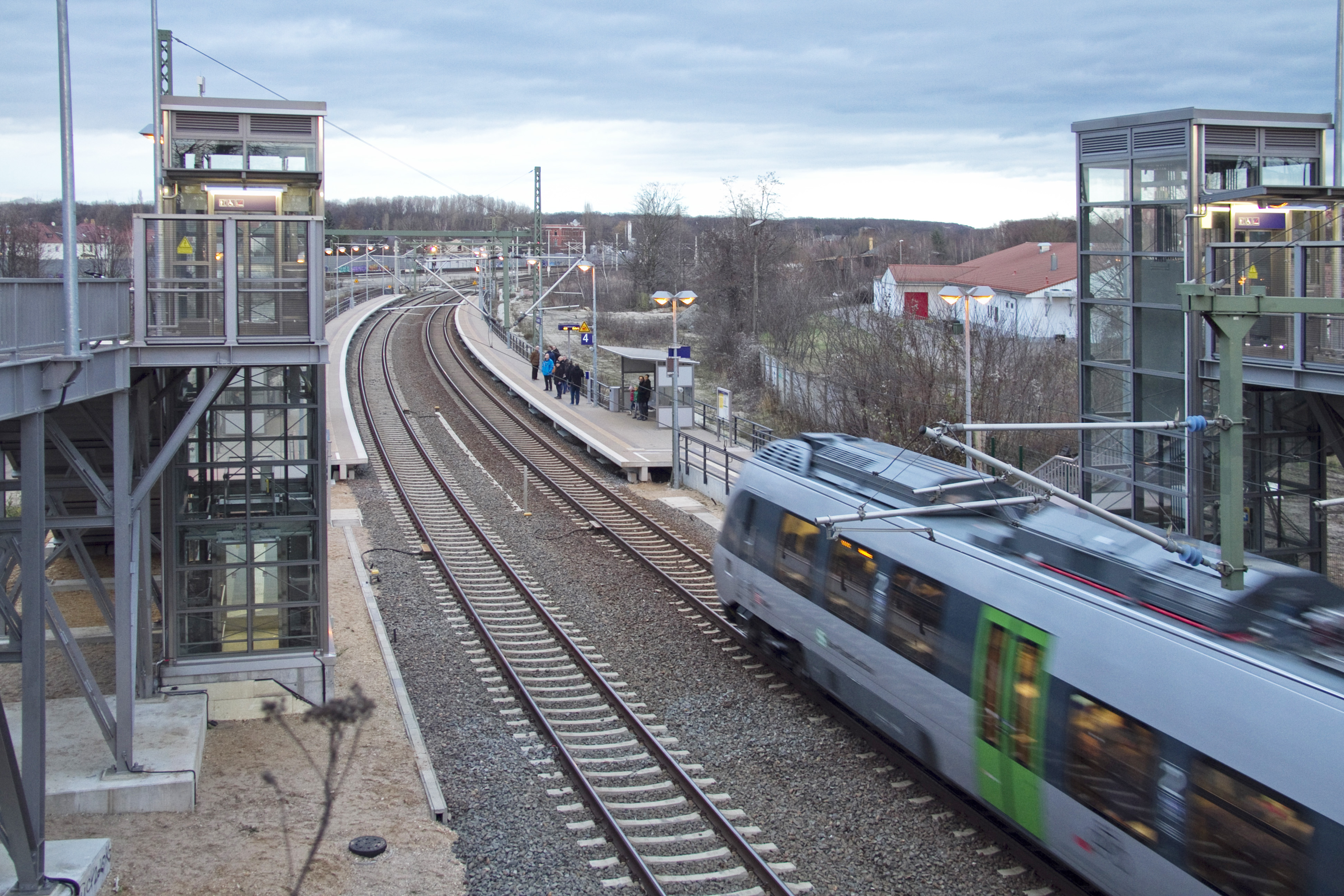
Track 3 and 4 in 2013.

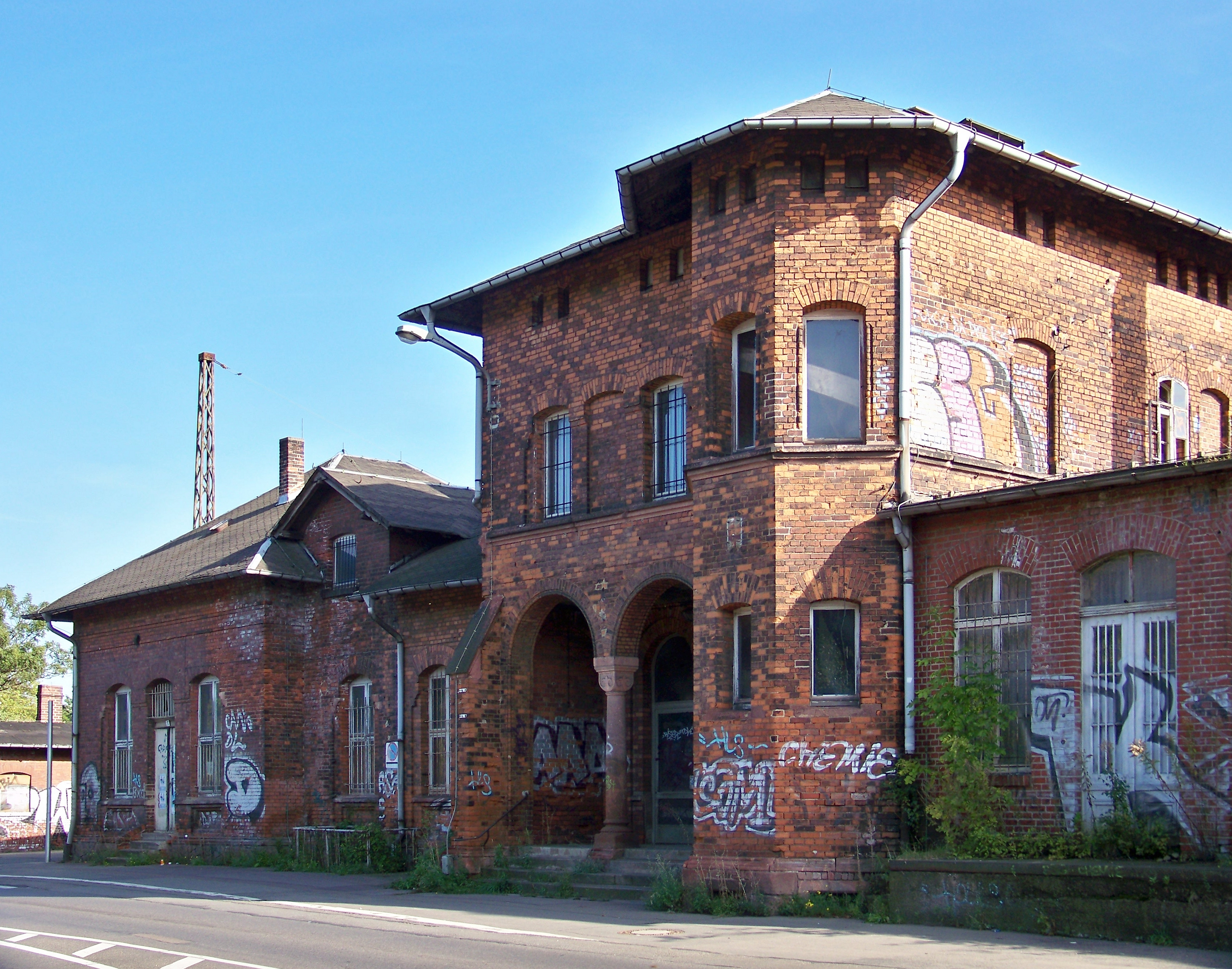
The old station building in 2009.

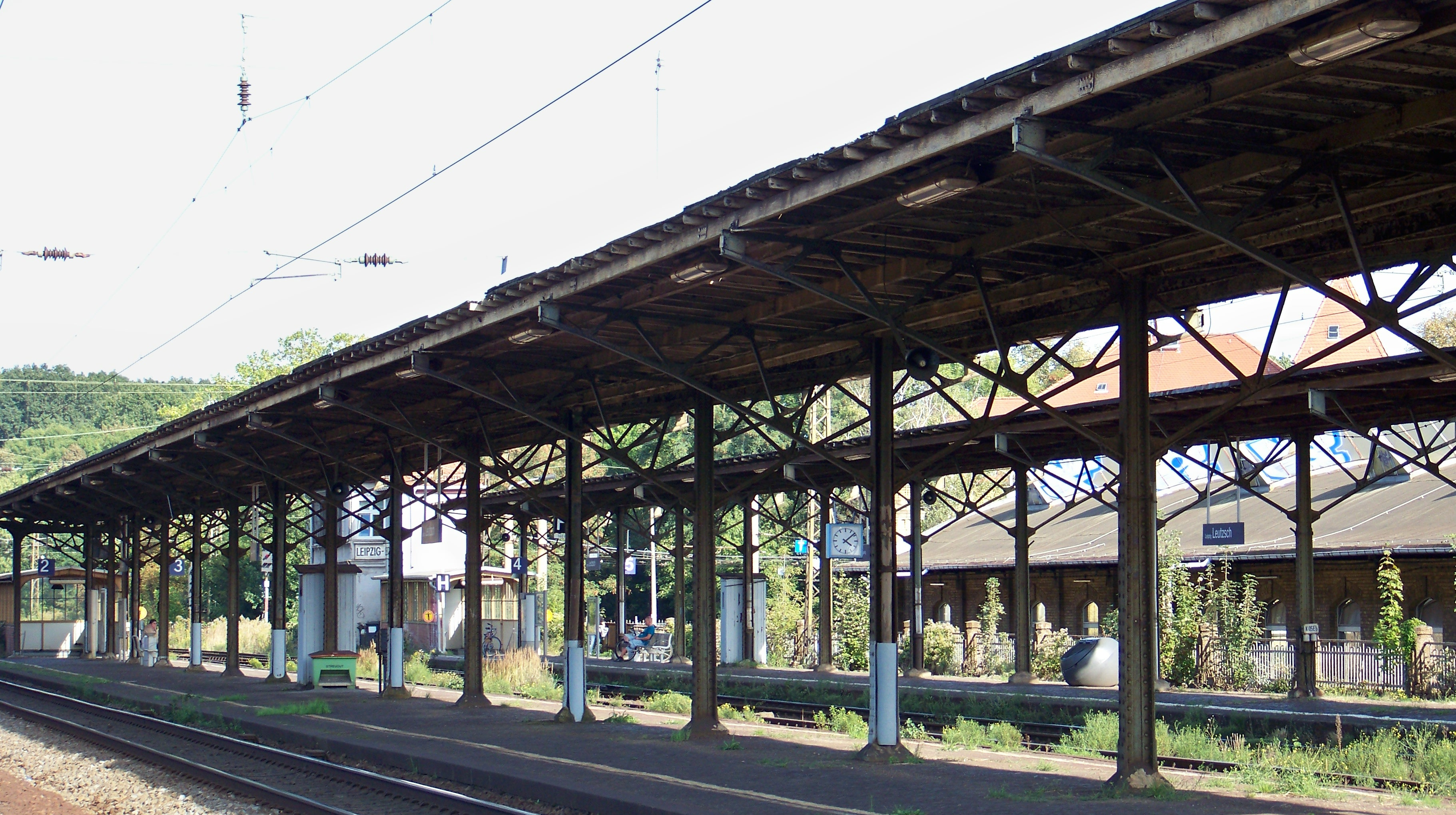
The old platforms in 2009.
