= Leipzig-Rückmarsdorf station =

Railway station in Leipzig, Germany

Leipzig-Rückmarsdorf

General information
- Location: Zum Bahnhof 19; 04178 Leipzig; Saxony; Germany
- Coordinates: 51.3420°N 12.2829°E
- Elevation: 114 m (374 ft)
- Owner: DB Netz
- Operator: DB Station&Service
- Lines: Leipzig–Großkorbetha railway (KBS 582)
- Platforms: 2 side platforms
- Tracks: 2
- Train operators: Abellio Rail Mitteldeutschland

Other information
- Station code: 5412
- DS100 code: LRMF
- IBNR: 8012817
- Category: 6
- Fare zone: MDV: 110
- Website: www.bahnhof.de

Services
Preceding station	Abellio Rail Mitteldeutschland	Following station
Leipzig-Miltitz towards Eisenach	RB 20	Leipzig-Leutzsch towards Leipzig Hbf
Location
- Location within Saxony

Leipzig-Rückmarsdorf station is a railway station in Leipzig, the largest city of Saxony, Germany, located in the Rückmarsdorf district.
