= Leipzig-Miltitz station =

Railway station in Germany

Leipzig-Miltitz
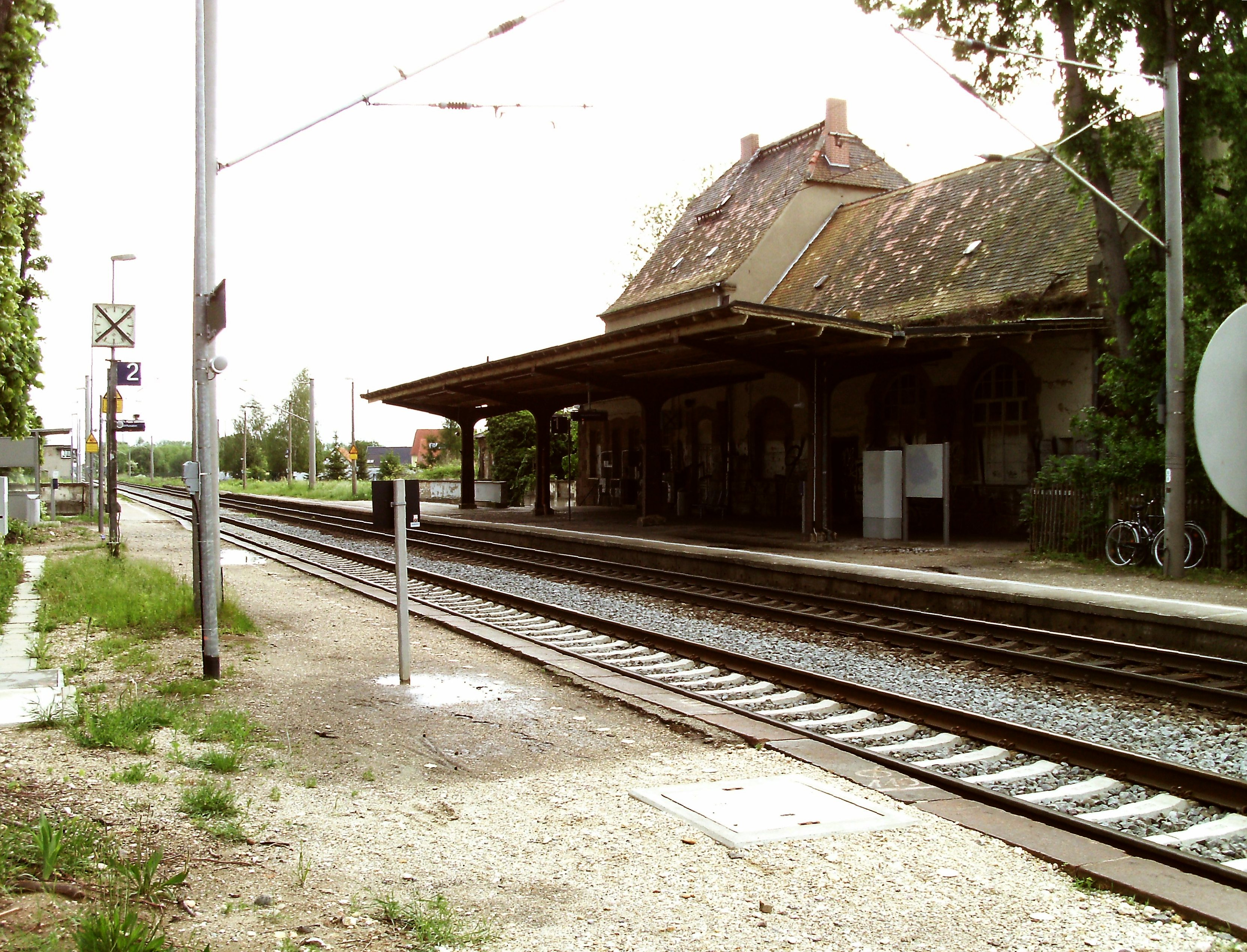
- 2012

General information
- Location: Am Bahnhof 16; 04205 Leipzig; Saxony; Germany
- Coordinates: 51.3251°N 12.2551°E
- Elevation: 117 m (384 ft)
- Owner: DB Netz
- Operator: DB Station&Service
- Lines: Leipzig–Großkorbetha railway (KBS 582)
- Platforms: 2 side platforms
- Tracks: 2
- Train operators: Abellio Rail Mitteldeutschland

Other information
- Station code: 4112
- DS100 code: LMIZ
- IBNR: 8012355
- Category: 6
- Fare zone: MDV: 110
- Website: www.bahnhof.de

Services
Preceding station	Abellio Rail Mitteldeutschland	Following station
Markranstädt towards Eisenach	RB 20	Leipzig-Rückmarsdorf towards Leipzig Hbf
Location
- Location within Saxony

Leipzig-Miltitz station is a railway station in Leipzig, the largest city in Saxony, Germany, located in the Miltitz district, in the west of the city.
