= Leipzig-Gohlis station =

Railway station in Gohlis Germany

Leipzig Gohlis
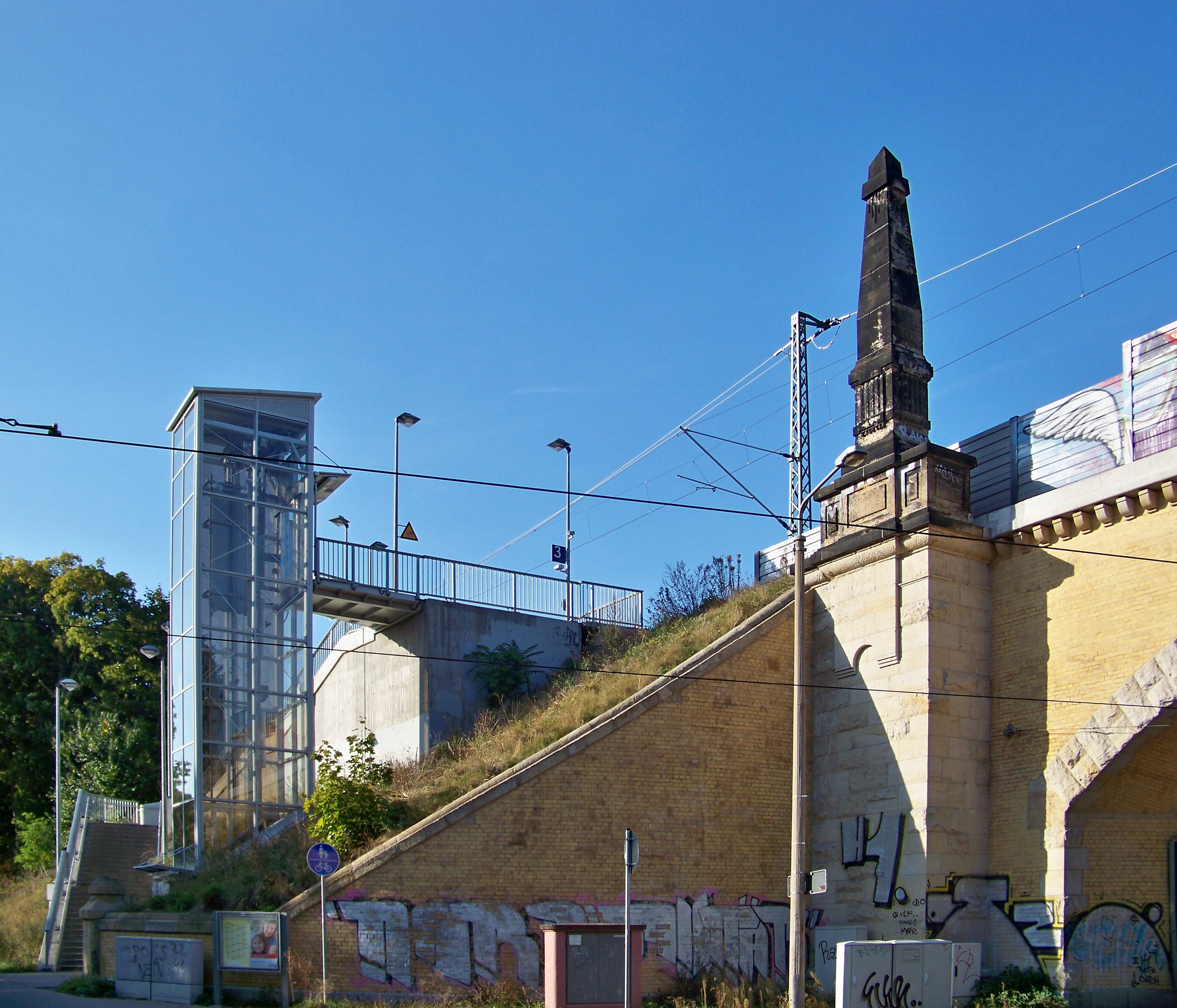
- Leipzig-Gohlis station

General information
- Location: Leipzig, Saxony; Germany
- Coordinates: 51.2147°N 12.2226°E
- Lines: Leipzig-Wahren–Leipzig Hbf railway; Leipzig–Großkorbetha railway
- Platforms: 3

Other information
- Station code: 3637
- Category: 4
- Fare zone: MDV: 110

History
- Opened: 1 April 1894; 132 years ago
- Electrified: 1922–1946 (Note: Since 1946 catenaries and overhead line masts were dismantled as Soviet war reparations.); 19 November 1958; 67 years ago
- Former names: 1894–1922 Gohlis-Eutritzsch

Services
Preceding station	Mitteldeutschland S-Bahn	Following station
Leipzig Coppiplatz towards Leipzig Miltitzer Allee	S 1	Leipzig Hbf towards Leipzig-Stötteritz
Leipzig Olbrichtstraße towards Halle-Nietleben	S 3	Leipzig Hbf towards Wurzen or Oschatz
Location

Leipzig-Gohlis (German: Bahnhof Leipzig-Gohlis) is a railway station located in Gohlis, a borough of Leipzig, Germany. The station is located on the Leipzig-Wahren–Leipzig Hbf and Leipzig–Großkorbetha railways. Passenger services are operated by DB Regio. Since December 2013 the station is served by the S-Bahn Mitteldeutschland.

== Train services ==
S-Bahn Mitteldeutschland services currently call at the station.
