= Leipzig Coppiplatz station =

Railway station in Leipzig, Germany

Leipzig Coppiplatz
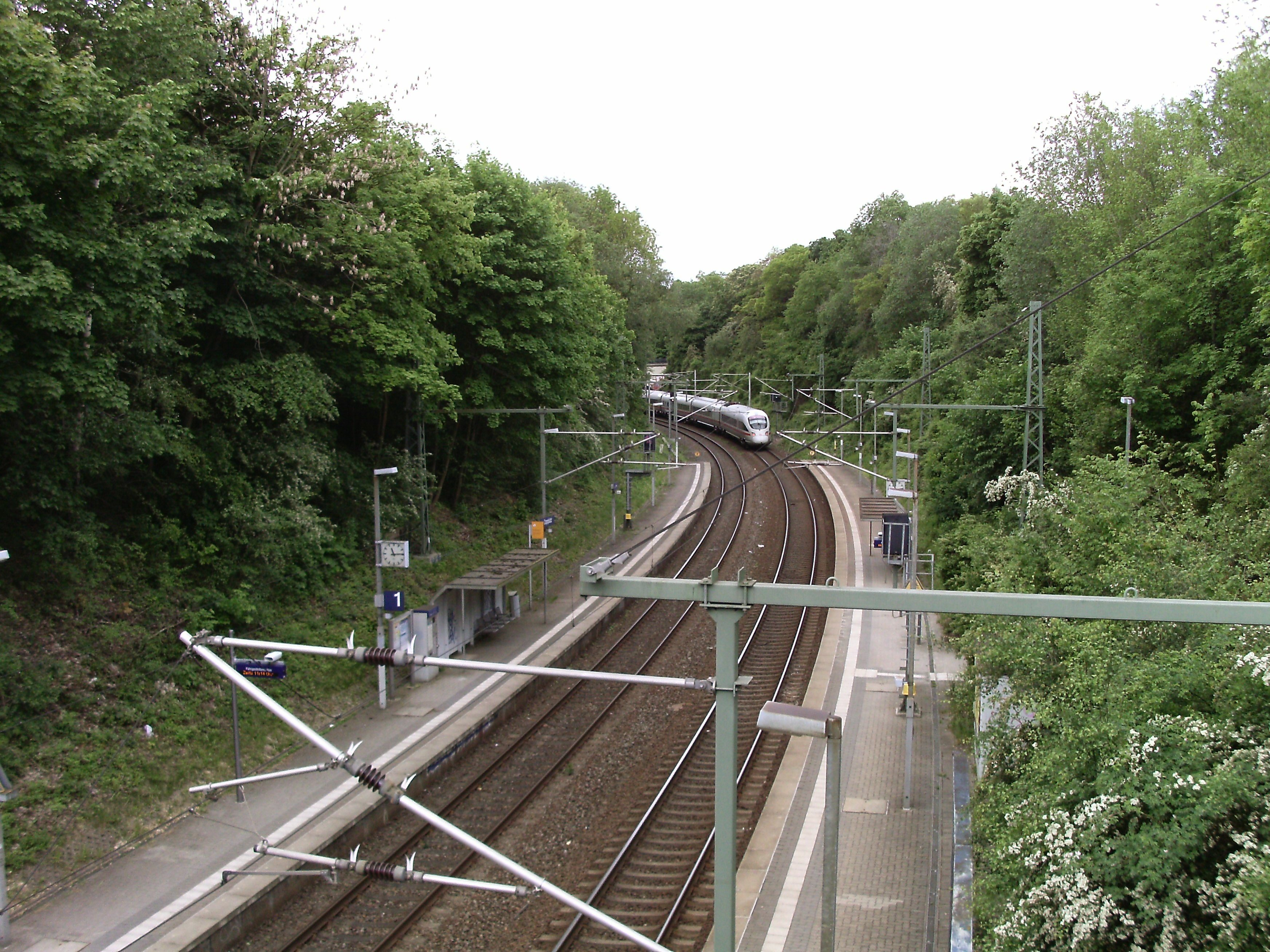
- Leipzig Coppiplatz station

General information
- Location: Leipzig, Saxony; Germany
- Coordinates: 51.3670174°N 12.3662685°E
- Line: Leipzig–Großkorbetha railway
- Platforms: 2

Other information
- Station code: 1070
- DS100 code: LCZ
- Category: 6
- Fare zone: MDV: 110

History
- Opened: 12 July 1969; 57 years ago
- Electrified: at opening

Services
Preceding station	Mitteldeutschland S-Bahn	Following station
Leipzig-Möckern towards Leipzig Miltitzer Allee	S 1	Leipzig-Gohlis towards Leipzig-Stötteritz
Location

Leipzig Coppiplatz (German: Haltepunkt Leipzig Coppiplatz) is a railway station located in Leipzig, Germany. The station is located on the Leipzig–Großkorbetha railway. The train services are operated by Deutsche Bahn. Since December 2013 the station is served by the S-Bahn Mitteldeutschland.

== Train services ==
S-Bahn Mitteldeutschland services currently call at the station:
