= Leipzig-Möckern station =

Railway station in Germany

Leipzig Möckern
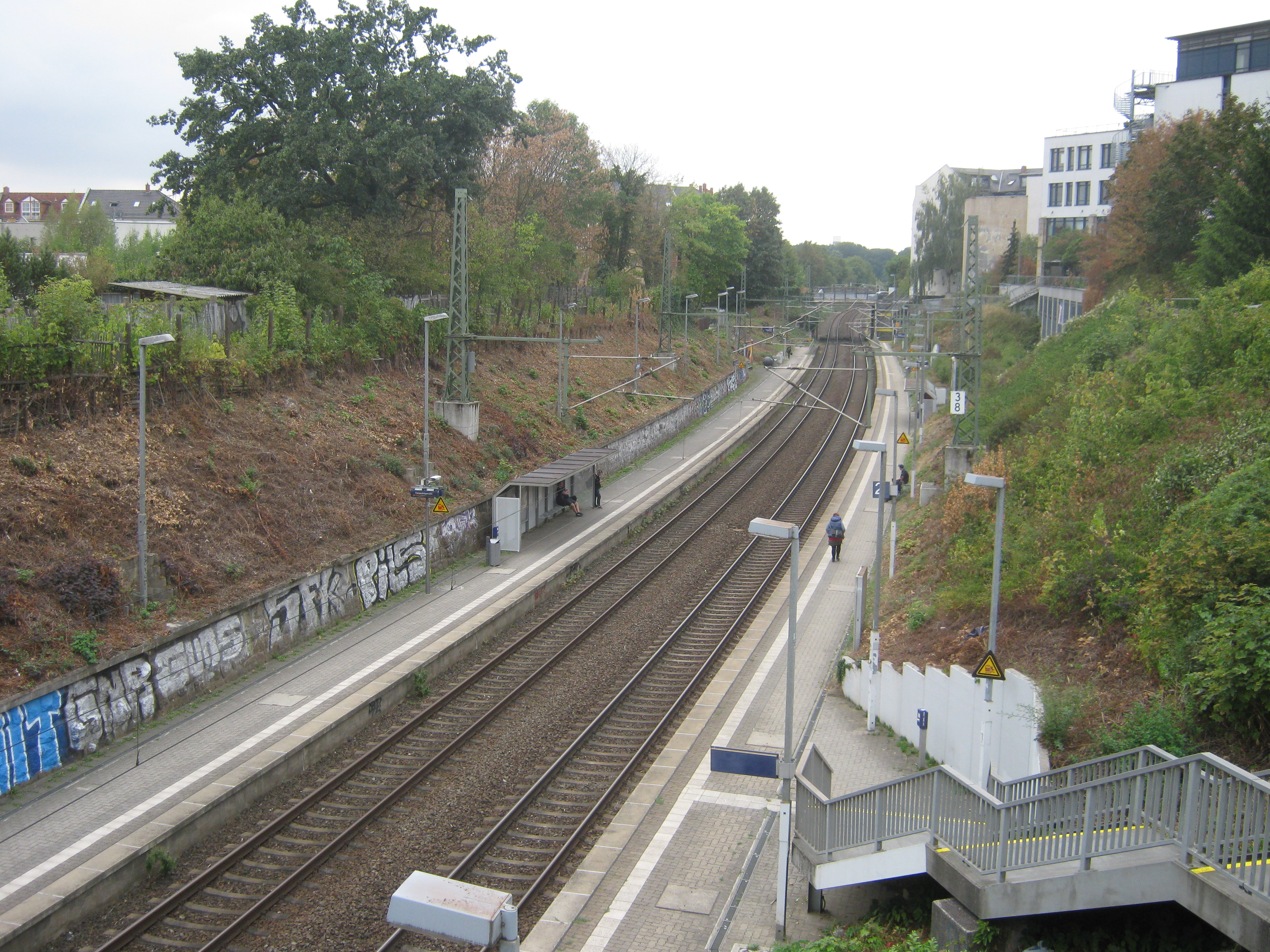
- Leipzig-Möckern station

General information
- Location: Leipzig, Saxony; Germany
- Coordinates: 51.3645414°N 12.3525927°E
- Line: Leipzig–Großkorbetha railway
- Platforms: 4

Other information
- Station code: 3643
- DS100 code: LLMH
- Category: 5
- Fare zone: MDV: 110
- Website: www.bahnhof.de

History
- Opened: 15 April 1892; 134 years ago
- Electrified: 1942-1946 (Note: Since 1946 catenaries and overhead line masts were dismantled as Soviet war reparations.); 26 May 1963; 63 years ago
- Former names: 1892-1922 Gohlis-Möckern

Services
Preceding station	Abellio Rail Mitteldeutschland	Following station
Leipzig-Leutzsch towards Eisenach	RB 20	Leipzig Hbf Terminus
Preceding station		Following station
Leipzig-Plagwitz towards Saalfeld (Saale)	RB 22 selected trains only	Leipzig Hbf Terminus
Preceding station	Mitteldeutschland S-Bahn	Following station
Leipzig-Leutzsch towards Leipzig Miltitzer Allee	S 1	Leipzig Coppiplatz towards Leipzig-Stötteritz
Location
- Location within Saxony

Leipzig-Möckern (German: Haltepunkt Leipzig-Möckern) is a railway station located in Leipzig, Germany. The station is located on the Leipzig–Großkorbetha railway. The train services are operated by Deutsche Bahn and Erfurter Bahn. Since December 2013 the station is served by the S-Bahn Mitteldeutschland.

== Train services ==
Abellio Rail Mitteldeutschland, Erfurter Bahn, and S-Bahn Mitteldeutschland services currently call at the station
