= Leipzig-Lindenau station =

Railway station in Leipzig, Germany

Leipzig Lindenau
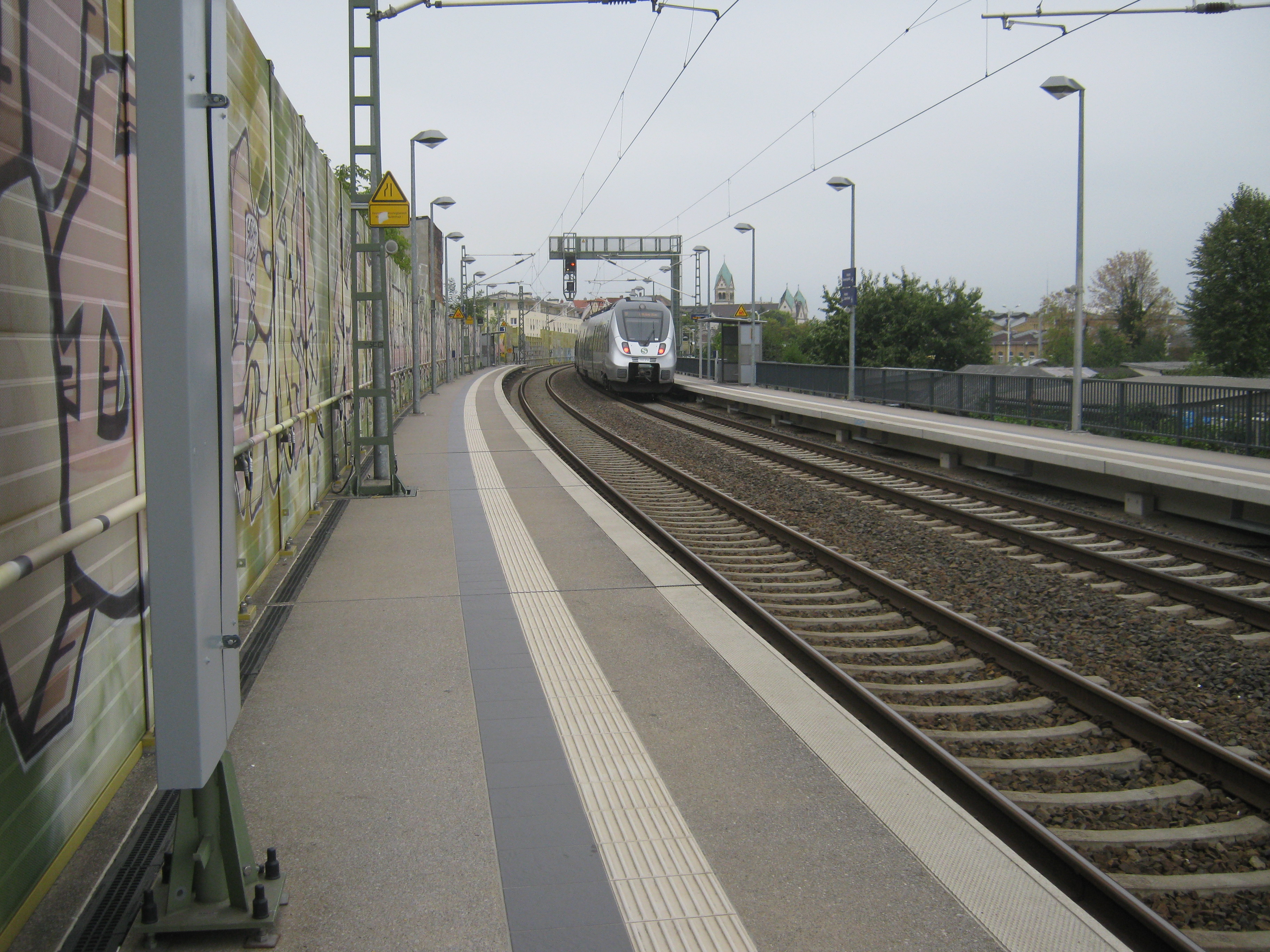
- Leipzig-Lindenau station in 2018

General information
- Location: Leipzig, Saxony; Germany
- Coordinates: 51°20′0.1248″N 12°19′18.246″E
- Line: Leipzig–Probstzella railway
- Platforms: 2

Other information
- Station code: 3731
- Category: 6
- Fare zone: MDV: 110

History
- Opened: 12 July 1969; 57 years ago
- Electrified: at opening

Services
Preceding station	Mitteldeutschland S-Bahn	Following station
Leipzig-Plagwitz towards Leipzig Miltitzer Allee	S 1	Leipzig-Leutzsch towards Leipzig-Stötteritz
Location

Leipzig-Lindenau (German: Haltepunkt Leipzig-Lindenau) is a railway station located in Leipzig, Germany. The station is located on the Leipzig–Probstzella railway. The train services are operated by Deutsche Bahn. Since December 2013 the station is served by the S-Bahn Mitteldeutschland.
