= Thuringian Railway Company =

Former transport company in Germany

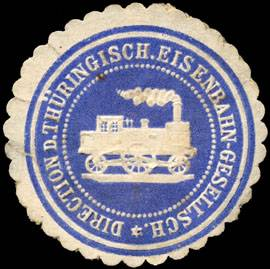
sealing stamp

The Thuringian Railway Company (German: Thüringische Eisenbahn-Gesellschaft) was a company that existed from 1844 to 1886 for the construction of railways in the Thuringian states.

== History ==
The Thuringian Railway Company was founded in 1844 at Erfurt. From the beginning a quarter of its share capital was held by the Kingdom of Prussia; the Grand Duchy of Sachsen-Weimar and the Duchy of Saxe-Gotha-Altenburg were also involved. Later the states of Saxe-Meiningen, Schwarzburg-Rudolstadt, Schwarzburg-Sondershausen, Reuss Younger Line and the city of Mühlhausen and the city and district of Langensalza also participated in the company.

Its first line was the 189-kilometre Thuringian Railway—still a very important east-west link between Halle and Gerstungen—which was built in sections and put into operation as follows:

- 6 June 1846: Halle–Weißenfels,
- 19 December 1846: Weißenfels–Weimar,
- 1 April 1847: Weimar–Erfurt,
- 10 May 1847: Erfurt–Gotha,
- 24 June 1847: Gotha–Eisenach
- 25 September 1849: Eisenach–Gerstungen, where the line connects with the Frederick William Northern Railway, which continued towards Kassel.

In the following years the network expanded with the following additional lines, reaching a total length of 505 kilometres:

- 22 March 1856: Leipzig–Markranstädt–Großkorbetha, 32 km,
- 9 February/19 March 1859: Weißenfels–Zeitz–Gera, 60 km,
- 1 October 1864: Erfurt–Ilversgehofen freight railway, 4 km,
- 16 May 1867: Neudietendorf–Arnstadt, 10 km,
- 11 April 1870: Gotha–Mühlhausen, 40 km,
- 3 October 1870: Mühlhausen–Leinefelde, 27 km,
- 20 December 1871: Gera–Saalfeld–Eichicht, 77 km,
- 20 October 1873: Leipzig-Leutzsch–Zeitz, 38 km,
- 6 August 1879: Arnstadt–Ilmenau, 27 km.

The Thuringian Railway had a contract with the Werra Railway Company between 1856 and 1874 to build, operate and maintain its lines, including its main line. The Thuringian Railway also managed the operation of the Gotha-Ohrdrufer Railway Company, opened on 8 May 1876.

Due to the importance of its lines, the Prussian government sought to take over the Thuringia Railway Company. It took over operation and management on 1 January 1882 and ownership on 1 July 1886.
