= Leipzig Hauptbahnhof =

Central railway terminus in Leipzig, Germany

Leipzig Hbf
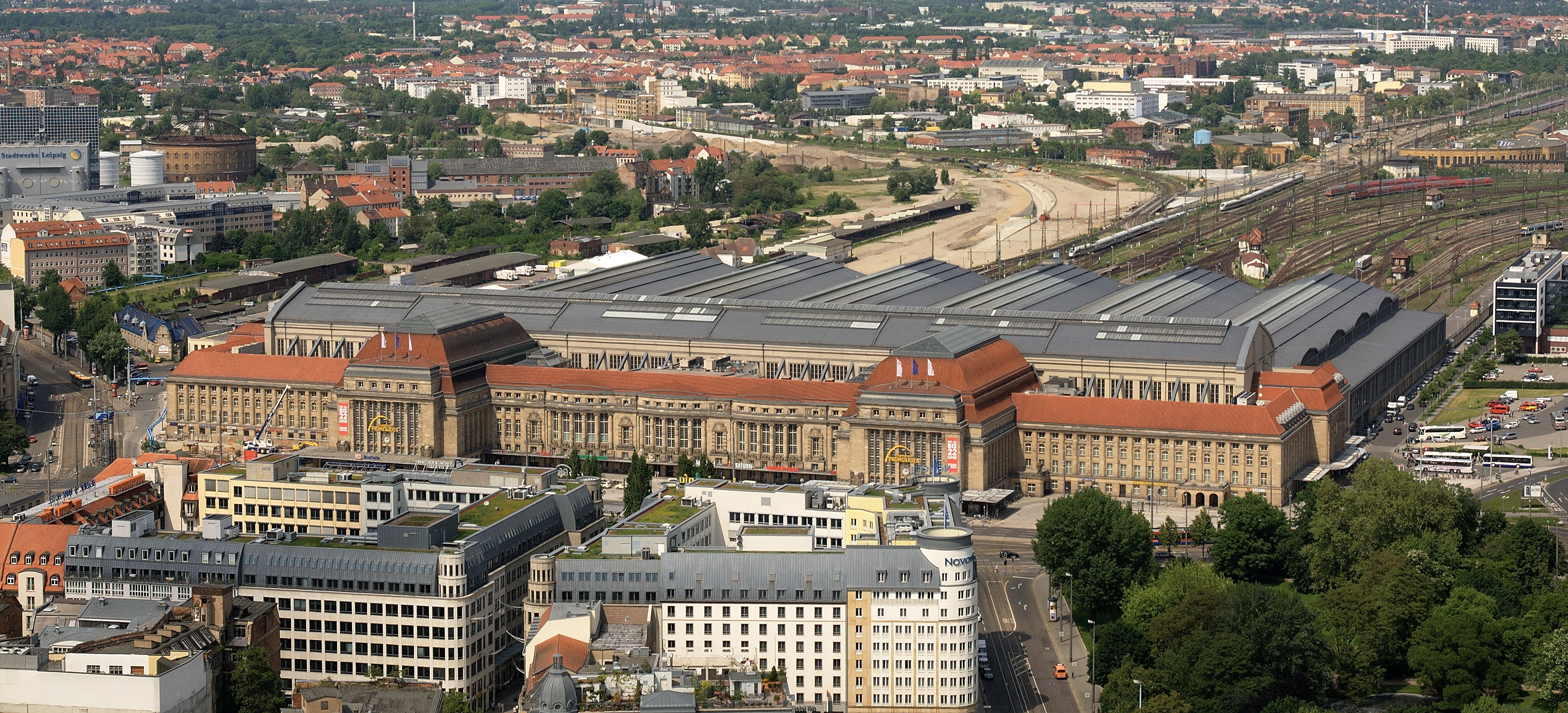
- View from City-Hochhaus

General information
- Location: Willy-Brandt-Platz 5, Leipzig, Saxony; Germany
- Coordinates: 51°20′43″N 12°22′56″E
- Owner: Deutsche Bahn
- Operator: DB InfraGO
- Lines: Leipzig–Eilenburg (KBS 215); Leipzig–Bitterfeld-Dessau (KBS 251); Leipzig–Halle (KBS 340); Leipzig–Dresden (KBS 500); Leipzig–Halle (HSL) (KBS 504); Leipzig–Meißen (KBS 506); Leipzig–Chemnitz (KBS 525); Leipzig–Hof (KSB 530); Leipzig–Gera (KBS 550); Leipzig–Weißenfels (KBS 582); Leipzig City Tunnel
- Platforms: 23 long distance platforms (21 + 2 City Tunnel)

Construction
- Accessible: Yes
- Architect: William Lossow; Max Hans Kühne

Other information
- Station code: 3631
- DS100 code: LL; LL T (City Tunnel)
- Category: 1
- IATA code: XIT
- Fare zone: MDV: 110
- Website: www.bahnhof.de

History
- Opened: 4 December 1915; 110 years ago
- Electrified: 1922-1946 (Note: Since 1946 catenaries and overhead line masts were dismantled as Soviet war reparations.); 9 June 1958; 68 years ago
Services
Preceding station	DB Fernverkehr	Following station
Reverses direction	ICE 11	Bitterfeld towards Berlin Gesundbrunnen
Reverses direction	ICE 11	Erfurt Hbf Terminus
Reverses direction	ICE 18	Bitterfeld towards Berlin Gesundbrunnen
Reverses direction	ICE 18	Erfurt Hbf One-way operation
Reverses direction	ICE 18	Naumburg (Saale) Hbf towards München Hbf
Erfurt Hbf towards München Hbf	ICE 28	Lutherstadt Wittenberg Hbf towards Hamburg-Altona
Erfurt Hbf towards Wiesbaden Hbf	ICE 50	Riesa towards Dresden Hbf
Leipzig/Halle Airport towards Stuttgart Hbf	IC 55	Riesa towards Dresden Hbf
Halle (Saale) Hbf towards Norddeich Mole	IC 56	Terminus
Halle (Saale) Hbf towards Rostock Hbf or Warnemünde	IC 57	Terminus
Weißenfels towards Karlsruhe Hbf	IC 61	Terminus
Erfurt Hbf towards Zürich HB	EC 12N	Riesa towards Praha hl.n.
Preceding station		Following station
Berlin Südkreuz towards Hamburg Hbf	FLX 35	Terminus
Preceding station	DB Regio Bayern	Following station
Weißenfels towards Nürnberg Hbf	RE 42	Terminus
Preceding station	DB Regio Nordost	Following station
Terminus	RE 10	Taucha towards Frankfurt (Oder)
Preceding station	DB Regio Südost	Following station
Delitzsch unt Bf towards Magdeburg Hbf	RE 13	Terminus
Terminus	RE 50	Engelsdorf towards Dresden Hbf
Terminus	RB 113	Leipzig-Paunsdorf towards Geithain
Preceding station	Abellio Rail Mitteldeutschland	Following station
Markranstädt towards Erfurt Hbf	RE 17 RE 74520 only	Terminus
Leipzig-Möckern towards Eisenach	RB 20	Terminus
Preceding station		Following station
Leipzig-Plagwitz towards Saalfeld (Saale)	RE 12	Terminus
Leipzig-Möckern towards Saalfeld (Saale)	RB 22	Terminus
Preceding station	Mitteldeutsche Regiobahn	Following station
Terminus	RE 6	Bad Lausick towards Chemnitz Hbf
Terminus	RB 110	Leipzig-Sellerhausen towards Döbeln Hbf
Preceding station	Mitteldeutschland S-Bahn	Following station
Leipzig-Gohlis towards Leipzig Miltitzer Allee	S 1	Leipzig Markt towards Leipzig-Stötteritz
Leipzig Nord towards Dessau Hbf or Lutherstadt Wittenberg Hbf	S 2	Leipzig Markt towards Leipzig-Stötteritz
Leipzig-Gohlis towards Halle-Nietleben	S 3	Leipzig Markt towards Wurzen or Oschatz
Leipzig Nord towards Falkenberg (Elster)	S 4	Leipzig Markt towards Markkleeberg-Gaschwitz
Leipzig Messe towards Halle (Saale) Hbf	S 5	Leipzig Markt towards Zwickau Hbf
Leipzig Messe towards Halle (Saale) Hbf	S 5x	Leipzig Markt towards Zwickau Hbf
Leipzig Nord towards Leipzig Messe	S 6	Leipzig Markt towards Geithain
Location

Leipzig Hauptbahnhof (Leipzig main station, IATA: XIT) is the central railway terminus in Leipzig, Germany, in the district Mitte. At 83,460 square metres (898,400 sq ft), it is Europe's largest railway station measured by floor area. It has 21 overground platforms housed in six iron train sheds, a multi-level concourse with towering stone arches, and a 298-metre-long (978 ft) facade at the northeastern section of the Inner City Ring Road. The two Leipzig City Tunnel platforms were inaugurated in December 2013.

The station is owned by DB InfraGO, a subsidiary of Deutsche Bahn, and is classified as a Category 1 station, one of twenty in Germany. It also functions as a large shopping centre. Train services are operated by Deutsche Bahn, S-Bahn Mitteldeutschland, Erfurter Bahn and Mitteldeutsche Regiobahn. As of 2008, Leipzig Hauptbahnhof handled an average of 120,000 passengers per day.

In March 2018, the Leipzig Long-Distance Bus Terminal opened on the east side, a few steps outside of the Hauptbahnhof building.

In 2021, Leipzig Hauptbahnhof was ranked the best railway station in Europe.

== History ==
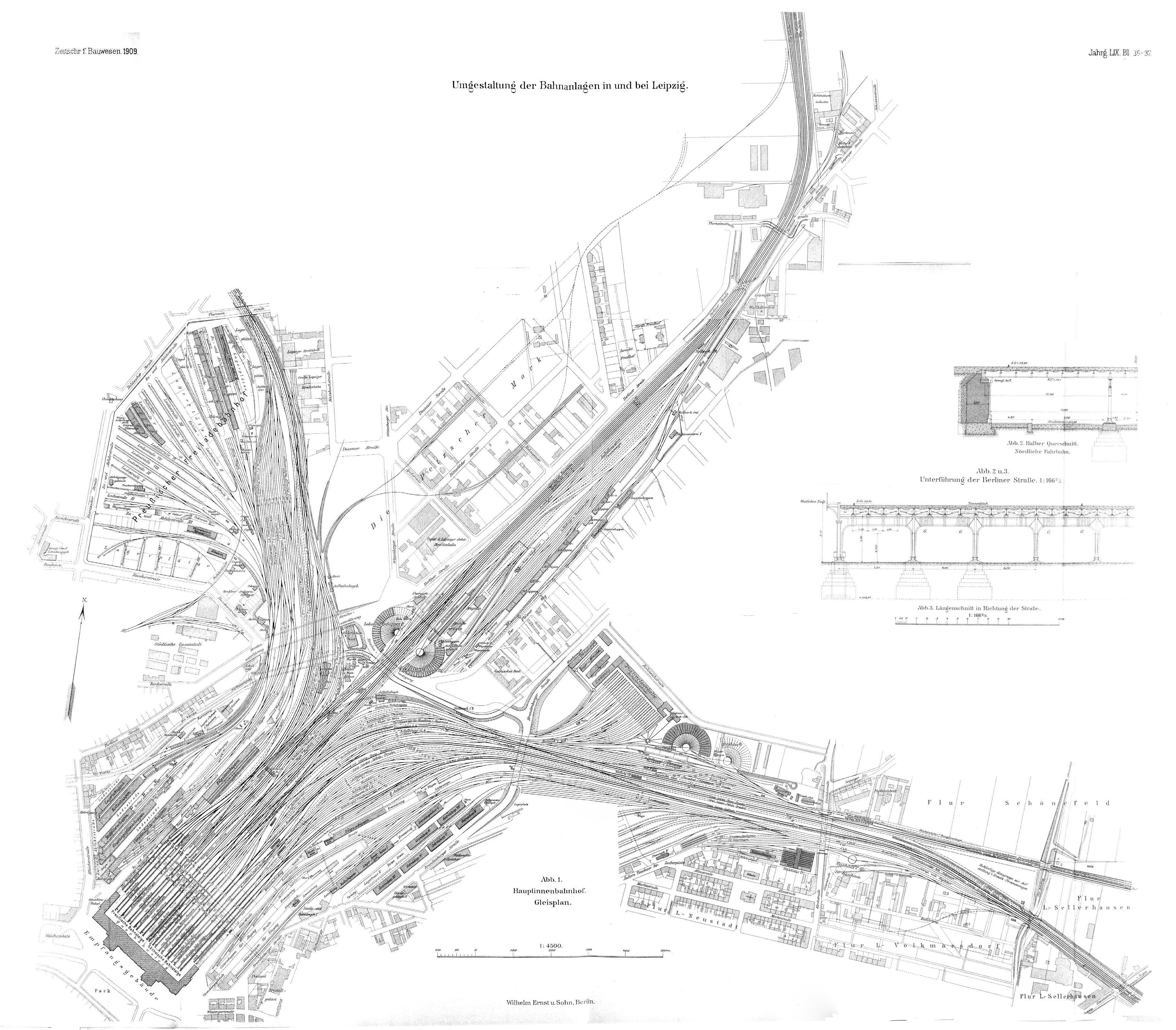
Track plan of 1909, the world's largest railway station by number of tracks, 26. In 1909 Leipzig was located in the German Empire's centre, "between Memel and Metz".

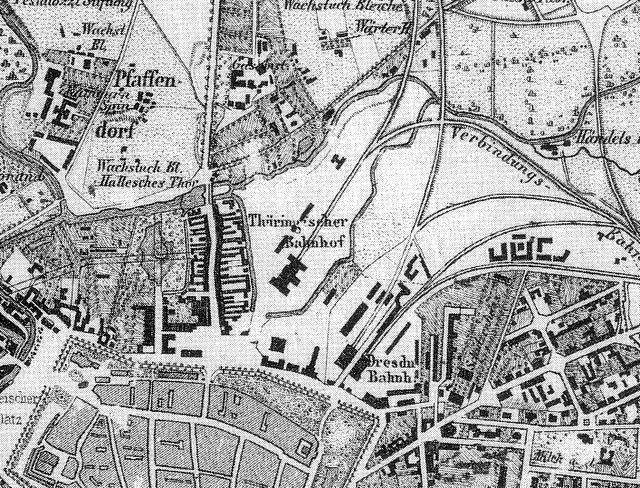
Thuringian and Dresden stations in Leipzig, 1860 map

After the opening of the Leipzig–Dresden railway line in 1839, followed by the Magdeburg-Leipzig railway one year later, the Leipzig–Hof railway in 1842, and the Leipzig–Großkorbetha railway in 1856, Leipzig had become the most important railway junction in the Kingdom of Saxony. Initially trains departed from separate termini, such as Bayerischer Bahnhof, located southeast of the Leipzig city centre. While the city's population increased sharply, especially upon German unification in 1871, the spatial separation proved to be complicated and ineffective.

By 1895, the Saxon railway lines were nationalized under the umbrella of the Royal Saxon State Railways, while the lines of the former Magdeburg–Halberstadt, Berlin-Anhalt, and Halle-Sorau-Guben railway companies had been incorporated into the Prussian state railways. Already in 1875, plans for the establishment of a united German imperial railway organisation, as proposed by Albert von Maybach, had derailed due to the antagonism of the Central German states, notably by the Saxon government. Therefore, two state railways rivalled to meet the demands of a steadily growing transport volume in the Leipzig area.

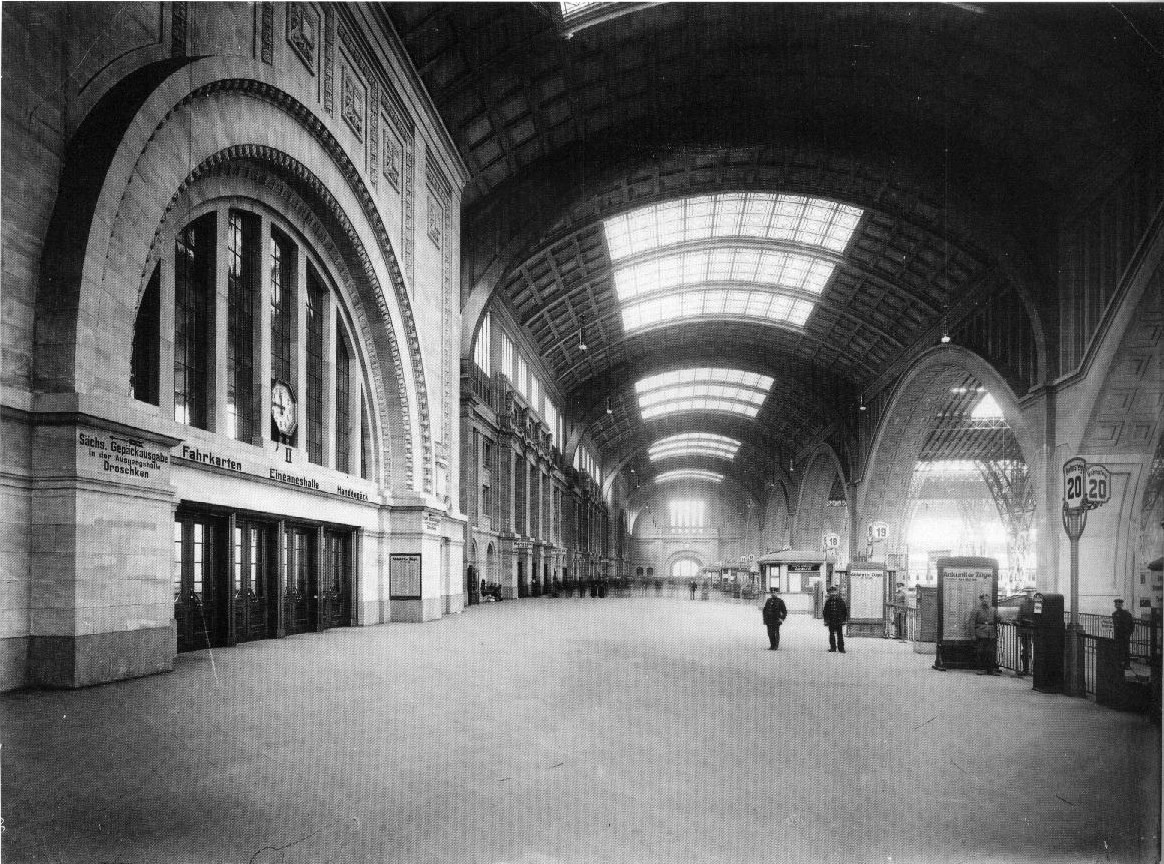
Concourse, 1916

Finally in 1898, the Leipzig city council decided on a joint terminal for Royal Saxon and Prussian state railways north of the city centre. A building contract with both organisations was signed in 1902 and an architectural competition with 76 participants was held in 1906. The winning design by the architects William Lossow (1852–1914) and Max Hans Kühne (1874–1942) featured two identical domed entrance halls facing the street, one for each company. The foundation stone was laid on 16 November 1909 and the platforms were gradually brought into operation station from 1912 onwards. When construction works finished on 4 December 1915, Leipzig Hauptbahnhof had become one of the world's largest railway stations with 26 platforms.

The separate administration of the Saxon and Prussian parts of the station continued even after World War I and the establishment of the nationwide Deutsche Reichsbahn railway organisation in 1920. Not until 1934 Leipzig Hauptbahnhof as a whole was assigned to the Reichsbahn directorate in Halle. By 1939, it had become one of Germany's busiest railway stations. The building was severely damaged by Allied bombing during World War II when during an air raid by the US Eighth Air Force on 7 July 1944 the roof over the concourse collapsed and the western entrance hall was destroyed. Numerous travellers and railway employees were killed. Rail traffic discontinued completely in April 1945.

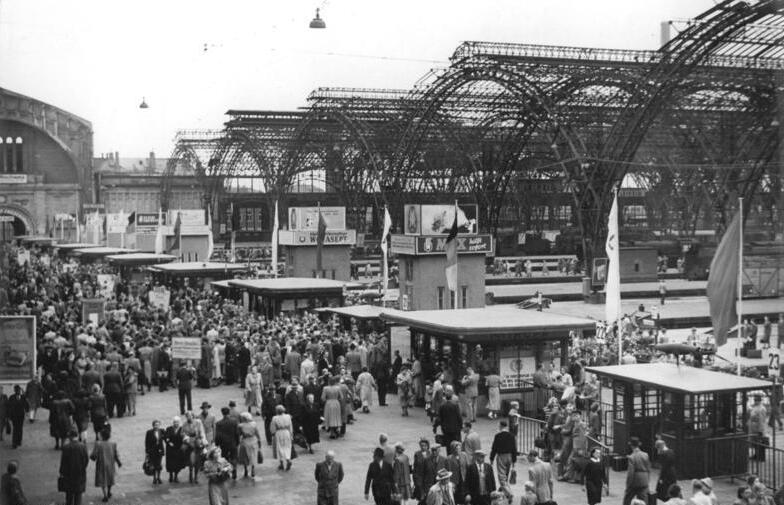
Concourse, 1953

After the war, train service was quickly resumed. The hardly damaged eastern entrance hall was restored by 1949, and the western hall was rebuilt to its original appearance by the Deutsche Reichsbahn railway company of East Germany in the early 1950s. The concourse, however, remained without a roofing, until in 1954 the East German Council of Ministers resolved upon a complete reconstruction. The full restoration of Leipzig Hauptbahnhof was finished on 4 December 1965, 50 years after its inauguration.

After German reunification the station was renovated and modernized by the Deutsche Bahn AG. The concourse floor was removed and two basement levels were dug out to create a shopping mall. Other areas of the building were largely restored and modernized at the time. The Design and Planning were done by the architectural firm HPP based in Düsseldorf. The modified station building was inaugurated on 12 November 1997.

The Leipzig City Tunnel, an underground railway line between the south of Leipzig and Hauptbahnhof via the central Markt station, opened on 14 December 2013. Further modifications of platforms and tracks were carried out in the course of the construction of the Erfurt–Leipzig/Halle high-speed railway line, part of the European Berlin–Palermo railway axis.

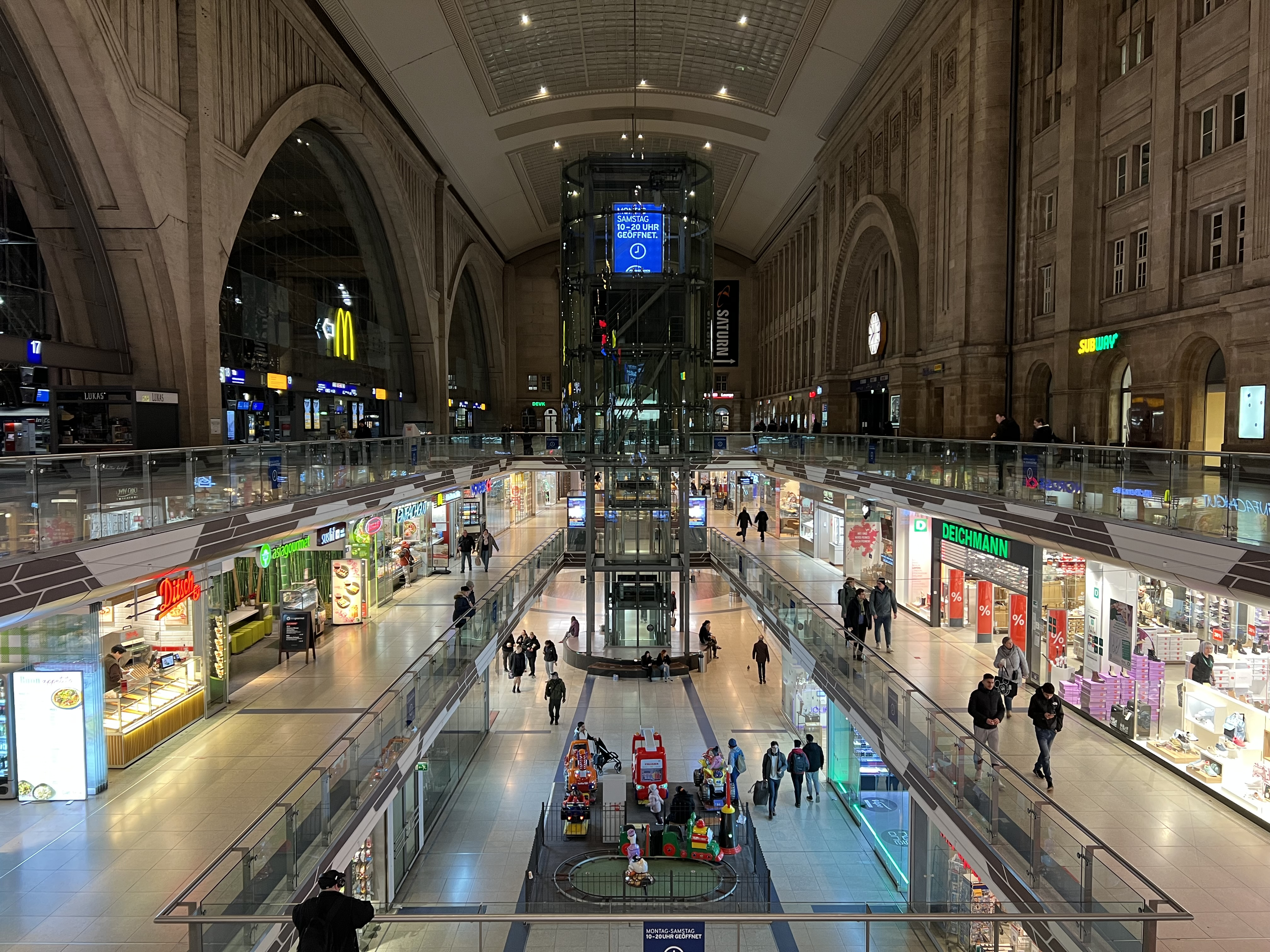
Concourse after modification

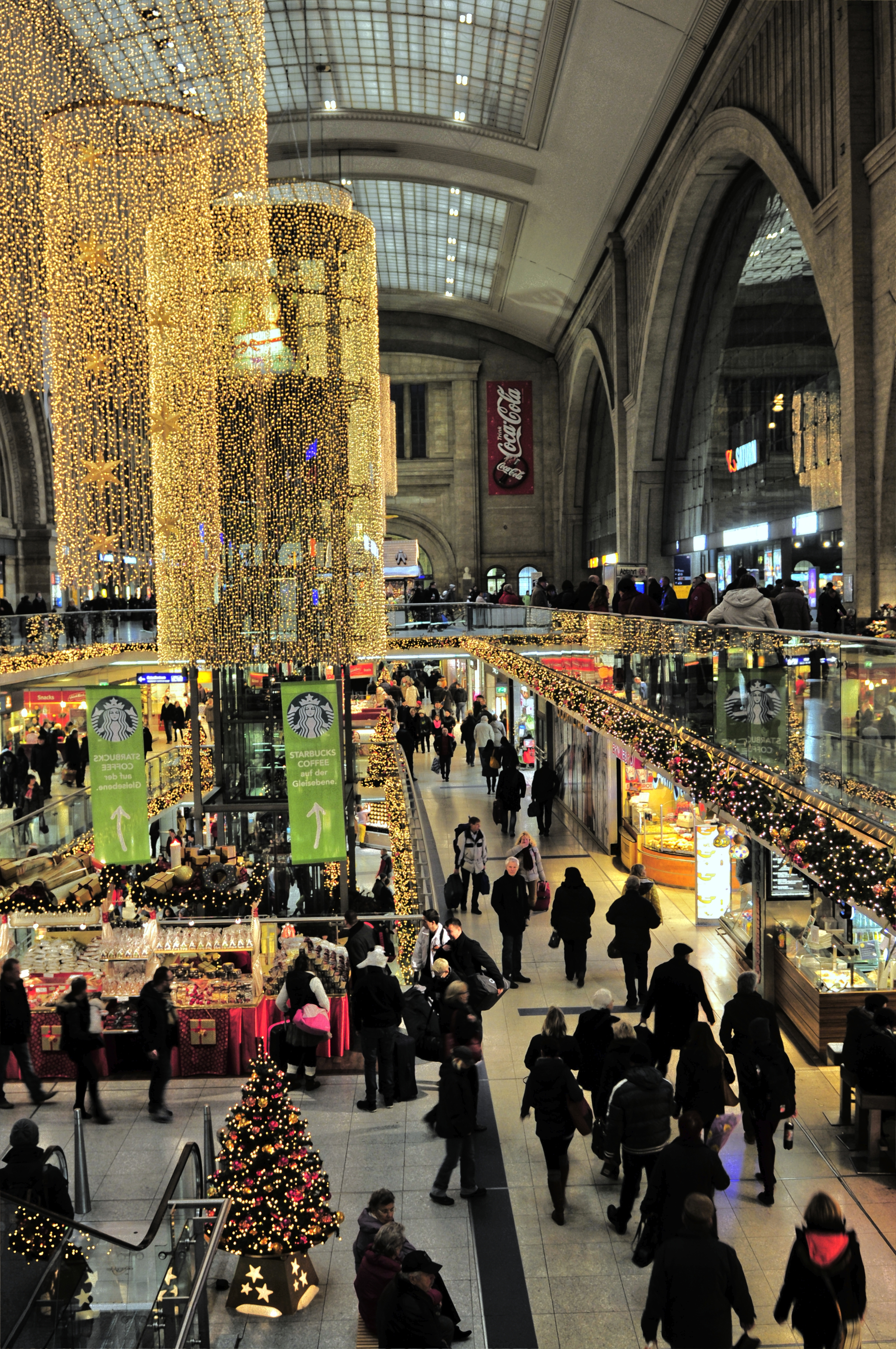
Interior during Christmas

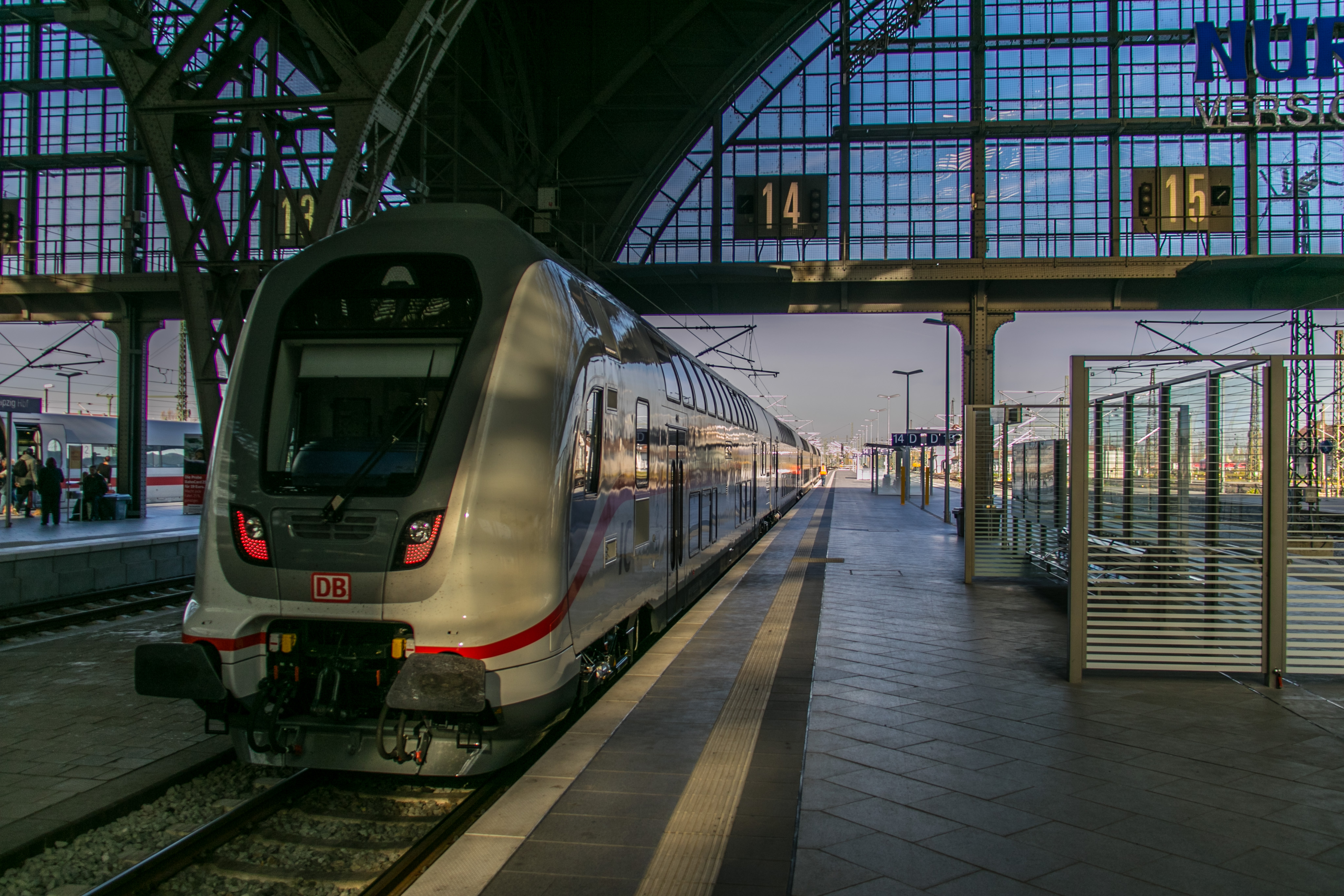

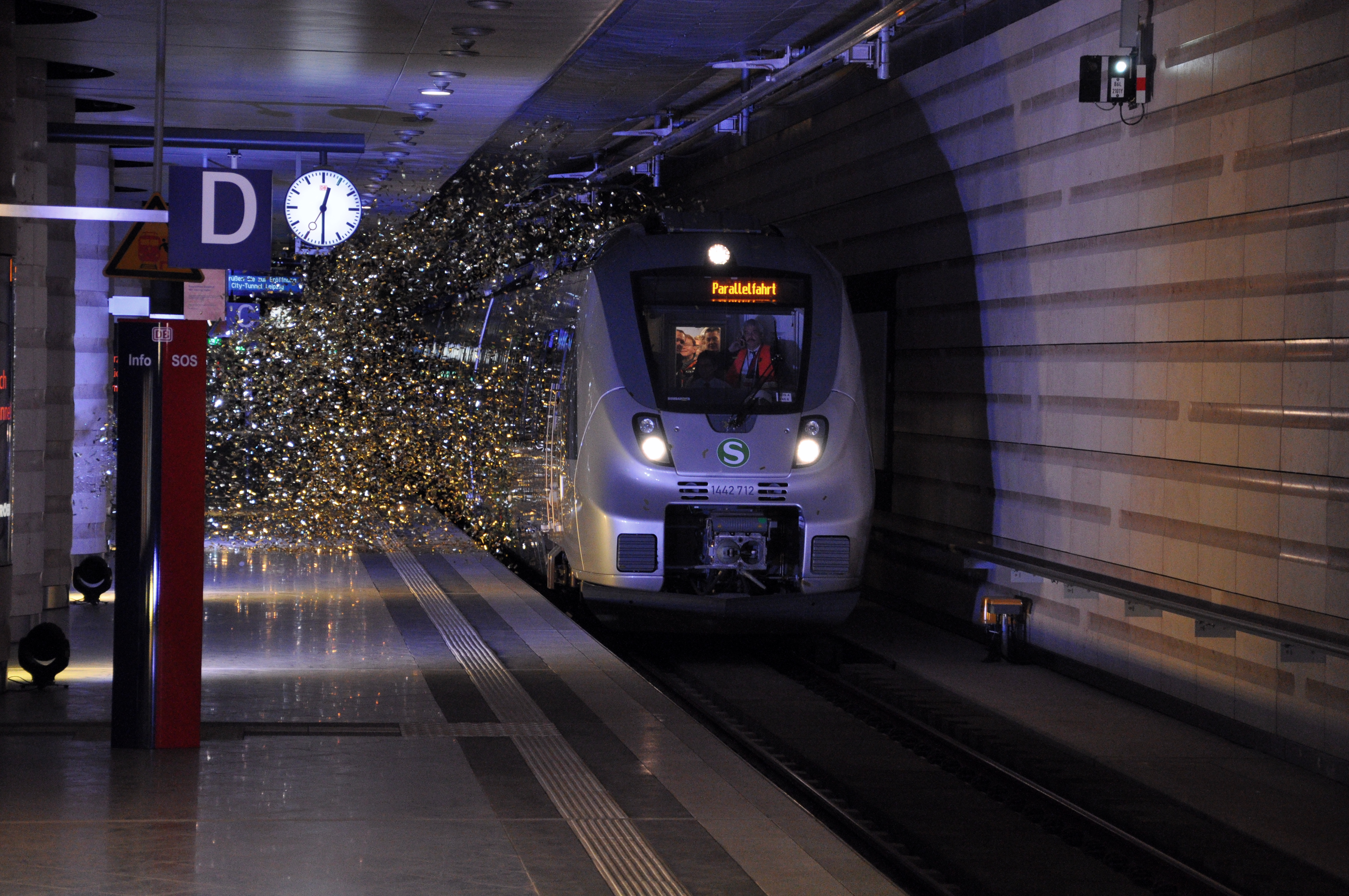
First train at the Leipzig City Tunnel on 14 December 2013

=== Historic exhibits ===
On the site of closed track No. 24, several historical Deutsche Reichsbahn locomotives are on display:

- Class 52 steam locomotive 52 5448-7
- Class SVT 137 Diesel multiple unit 137 225
- Class E04 AC electric locomotive E04 01
- Class E44 AC electric locomotive E44 046
- Class E94 AC electric locomotive E94 056

=== Movie set ===
Leipzig Hauptbahnhof served as a backdrop for several films, such as

- Shining Through (1992)
- Obsession (1997)
- Mr. Nobody (2009).

== Train services ==
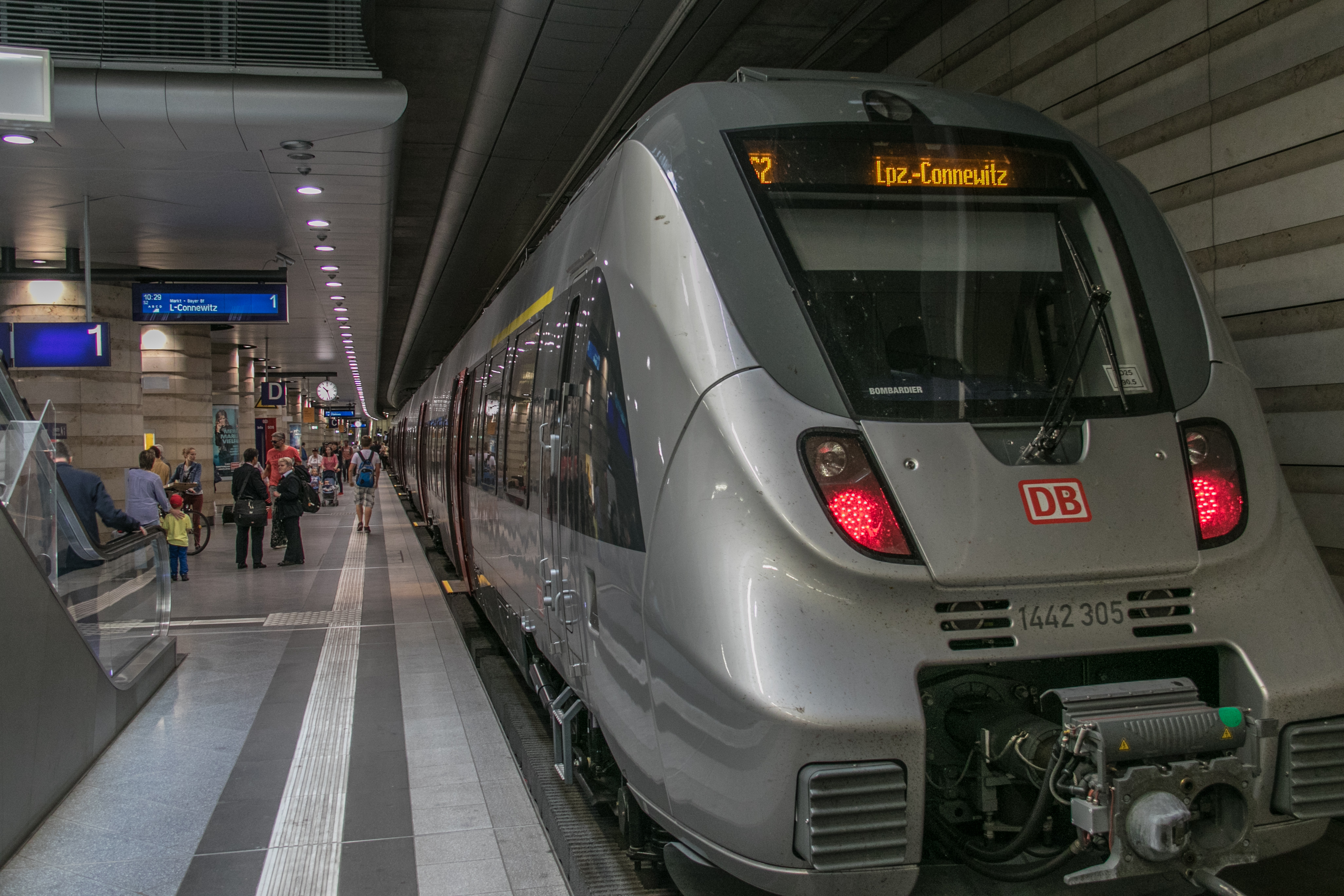
S-Bahn Mitteldeutschland at Leipzig City Tunnel

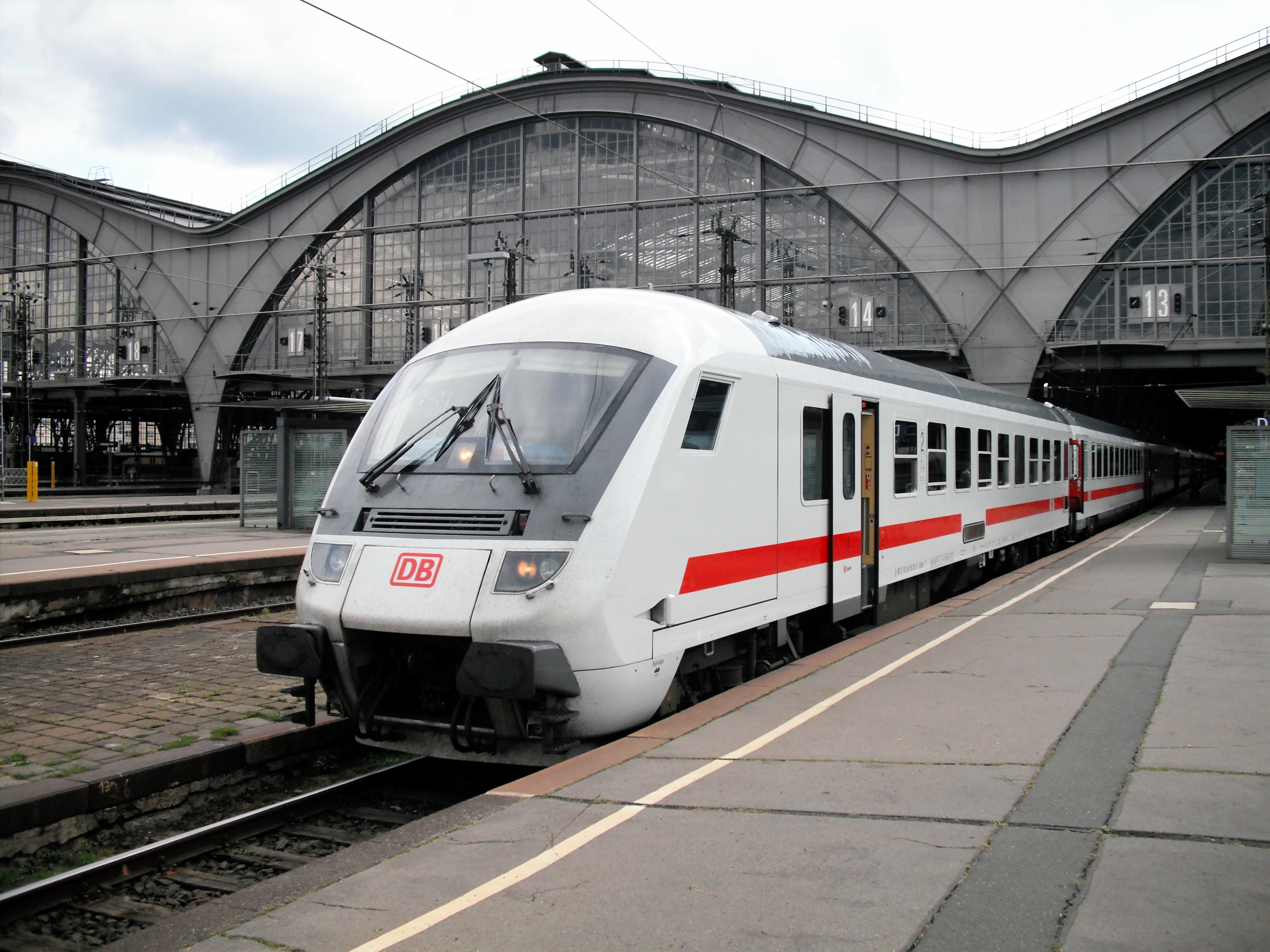
Intercity train, 2009

In the 2026 timetable, the following services stop at the station:

=== Long distance ===
Line	Route	Interval (min)	Operator
ICE 11	Berlin – Lutherstadt Wittenberg – Leipzig – Erfurt – Frankfurt – Stuttgart – Augsburg – Munich	120	DB Fernverkehr
ICE 18	Munich – Augsburg – Nuremberg – Naumburg – Leipzig – Berlin – Berlin Gesundbrunnen	Once a day	DB Fernverkehr
ICE 28	Hamburg – Berlin – Lutherstadt Wittenberg – Leipzig – Erfurt – Bamberg – Nuremberg – Munich	120	DB Fernverkehr
ICE 50	Dresden – Riesa – Leipzig – Erfurt – Eisenach – Fulda – Frankfurt – Mainz – Wiesbaden	120	DB Fernverkehr
IC 55	Dresden – Riesa – Leipzig – Halle – Magdeburg – Braunschweig – Hannover – Bielefeld – Dortmund – Wuppertal – Cologne – Bonn – Mainz – Mannheim – Heidelberg – Stuttgart	120	DB Fernverkehr
IC 56	Leipzig – Halle – Magdeburg – Braunschweig – Hannover – Bremen – Oldenburg – Leer – Emden – Norddeich Mole	120	DB Fernverkehr
IC 57	Leipzig – Halle – Magdeburg – Stendal – Wittenberge – Ludwigslust – Schwerin – Rostock (– Warnemünde)	2 train pairs	DB Fernverkehr
IC 61	Leipzig – Naumburg – Jena – Saalfeld – Lichtenfels – Nuremberg – Aalen – Schorndorf – Stuttgart – Pforzheim – Karlsruhe	2 train pairs	DB Fernverkehr
FLX 35	Leipzig – Berlin Südkreuz – Berlin Hbf – Berlin-Spandau – Hamburg Hbf	1 or 2 train pairs	Flixtrain

=== Regional and S-Bahn ===
Line	Route	Interval (min)	Operator
RE 6	Leipzig – Belgershain – Bad Lausick – Geithain – Burgstädt – Chemnitz	60	Transdev
RE 10	Leipzig – Eilenburg – Torgau – Falkenberg – Doberlug-Kirchhain – Calau – Cottbus	120	DB Regio Nordost
RE 12	Leipzig – Pegau – Zeitz – Bad Köstritz – Gera – Weida – Pößneck – Saalfeld	120	Erfurter Bahn
RE 13	Leipzig – Delitzsch – Bitterfeld – Dessau – Zerbst – Biederitz – Magdeburg	60	DB Regio Südost
RE 42	Leipzig – Weißenfels – Naumburg – Jena – Saalfeld – Bamberg – Erlangen – Nuremberg	120	DB Regio Bayern
RE 50	Leipzig – Wurzen – Oschatz – Riesa – Priestewitz – Radebeul Ost – Dresden	60	DB Regio Südost
RB 20	Leipzig – Bad Dürrenberg – Weißenfels – Naumburg – Apolda – Weimar – Erfurt – Gotha – Eisenach	60	Abellio
RB 22	Leipzig – Pegau – Zeitz – Bad Köstritz – Gera – Weida – Pößneck – Könitz – Saalfeld	120	Erfurter Bahn
RB 110	Leipzig – Borsdorf – Grimma – Leisnig – Döbeln	60	Transdev
RB 113	Leipzig – Belgershain – Bad Lausick – Geithain	60	DB Regio Südost
S 1	Leipzig Miltitzer Allee – Leipzig-Plagwitz – Leipzig – Leipzig Markt – Leipzig-Stötteritz	30	DB Regio Südost
S 2	(Jüterbog –) Wittenberg / Dessau – Bitterfeld – Delitzsch – Leipzig – Leipzig Markt – Leipzig-Stötteritz	30	DB Regio Südost
S 3	Halle-Trotha – Halle – Schkeuditz – Leipzig – Leipzig Markt – Leipzig-Connewitz (– Markkleeberg-Gaschwitz)	30	DB Regio Südost
S 4	Hoyerswerda – Falkenberg – Eilenburg – Leipzig – Leipzig Markt – Leipzig-Stötteritz – Wurzen (– Oschatz)	30	DB Regio Südost
S 5	Halle – Flughafen Leipzig/Halle – Leipzig – Leipzig Markt – Markkleeberg – Altenburg – Gößnitz – Zwickau	60	DB Regio Südost
S 5X	Halle – Flughafen Leipzig/Halle – Leipzig – Leipzig Markt – Markkleeberg – Altenburg – Gößnitz – Zwickau	60	DB Regio Südost
S 6	Leipzig Messe – Leipzig – Leipzig Markt – Leipzig-Connewitz – Markkleeberg – Borna – Geithain	30 (Mon–Fri)	DB Regio Südost

== Gallery ==
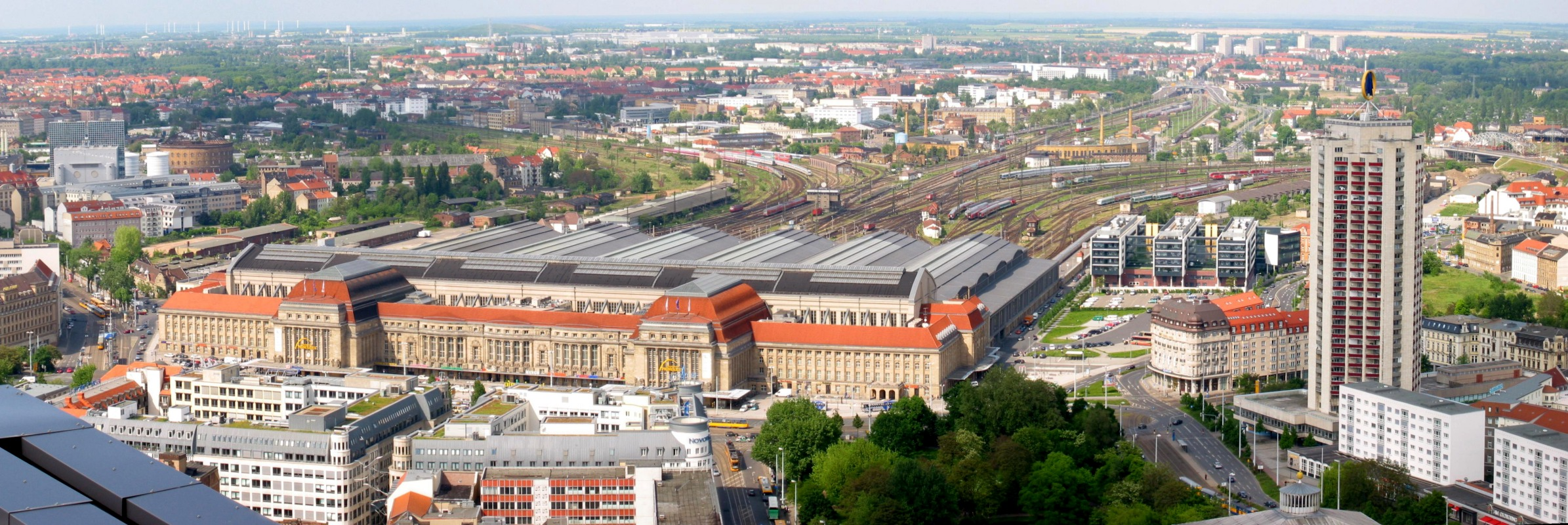
Aerial picture of the station

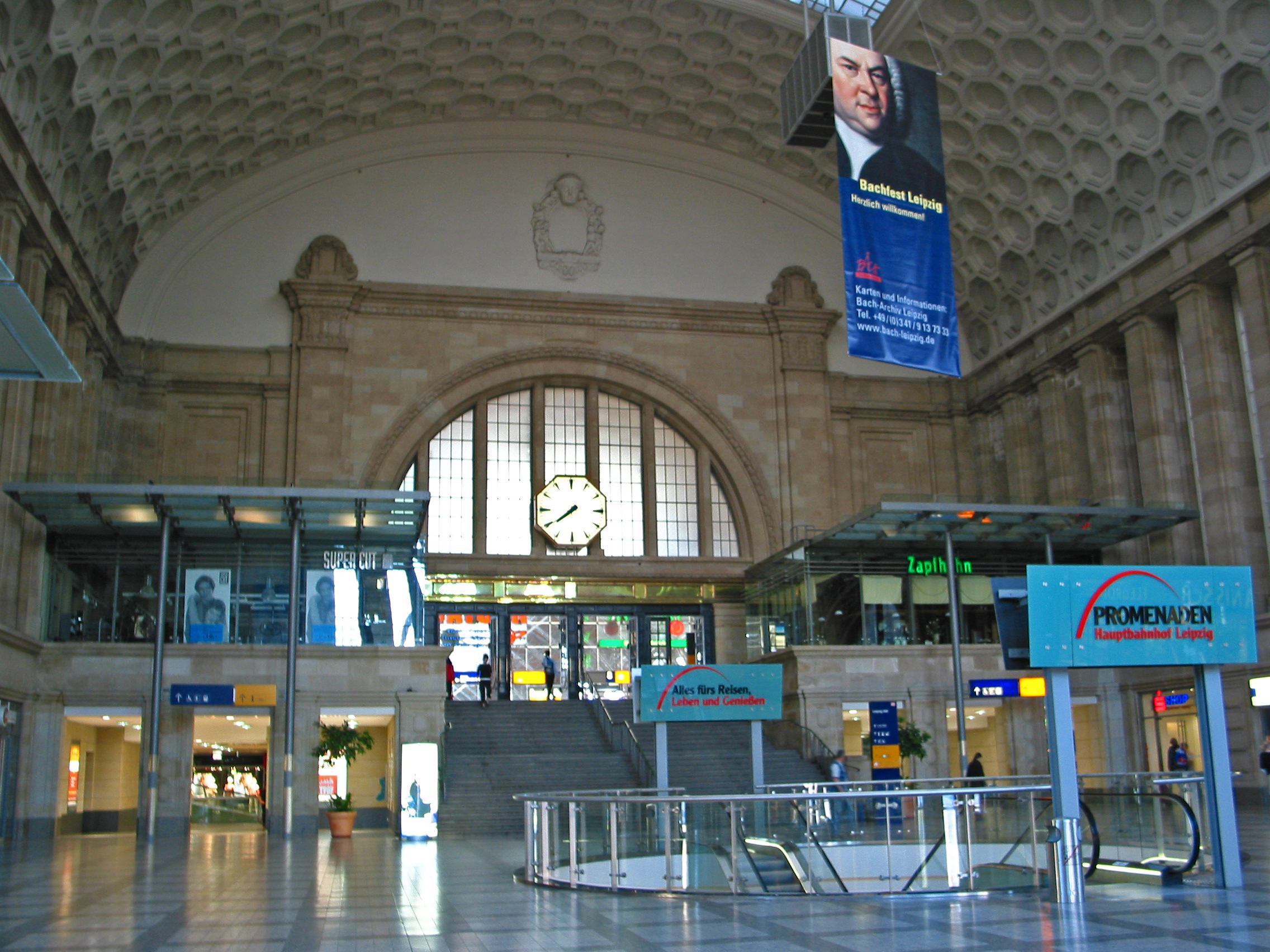
One of the two identical entrance halls

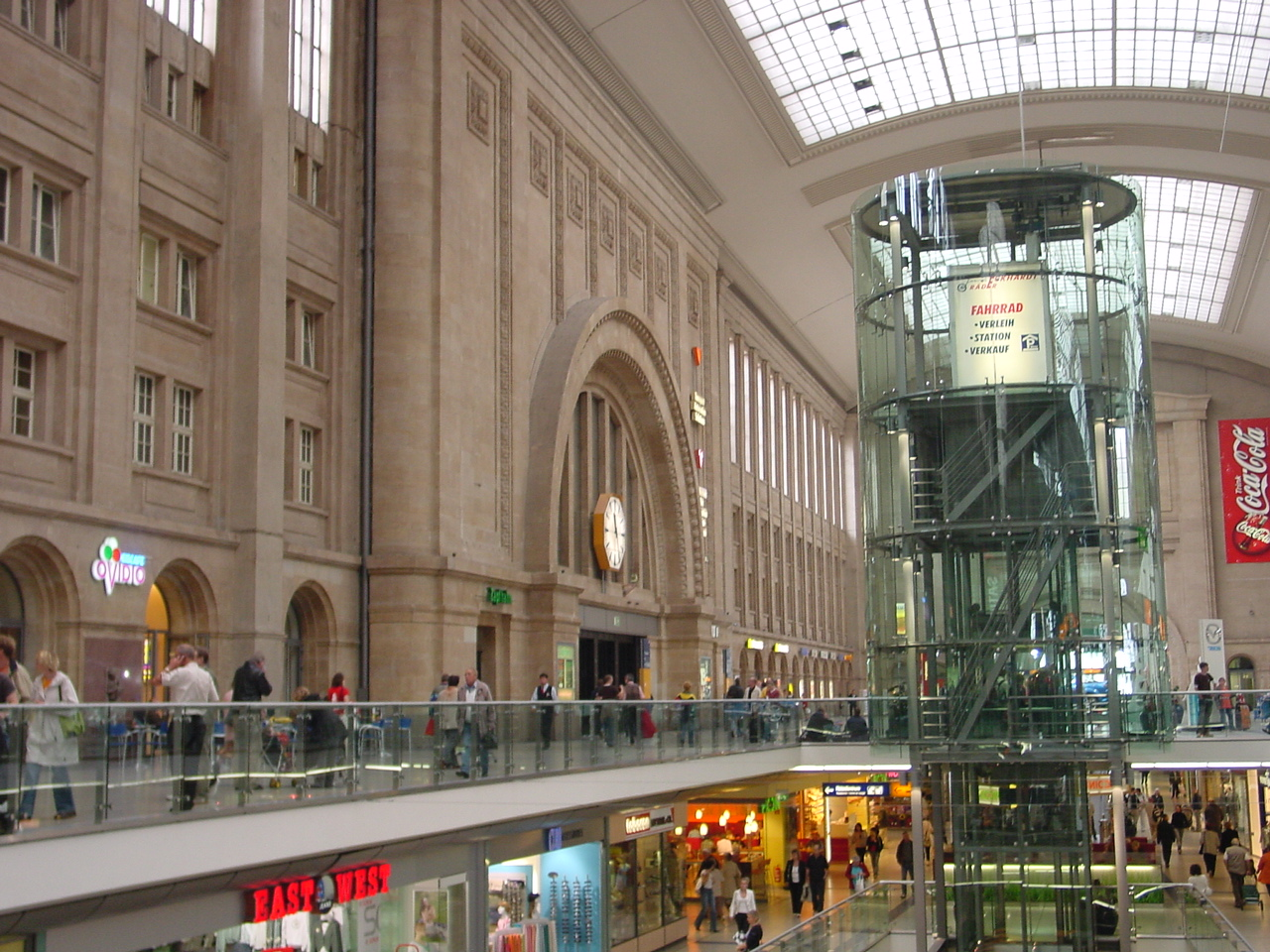
Concourse

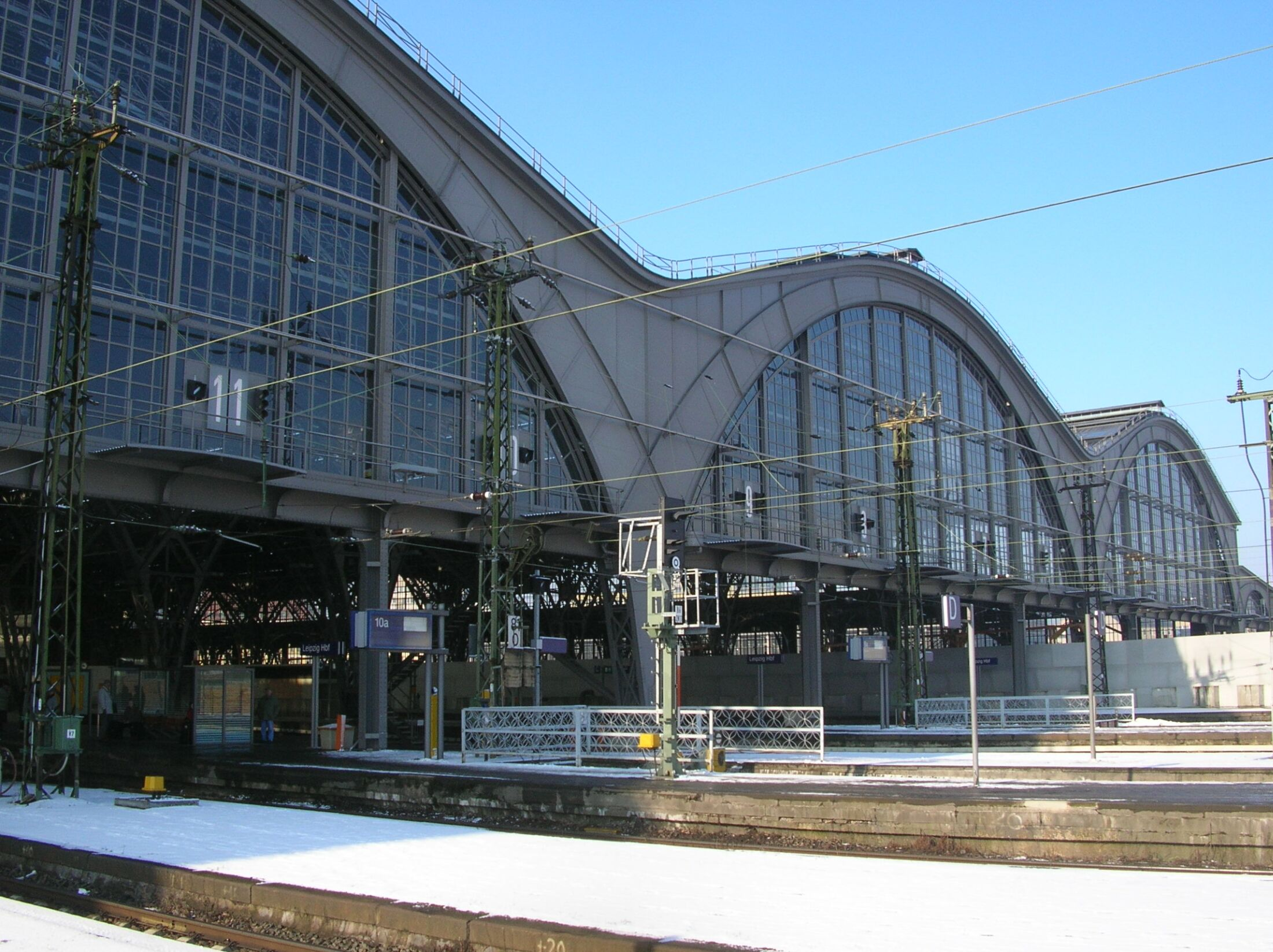
Train shed detail

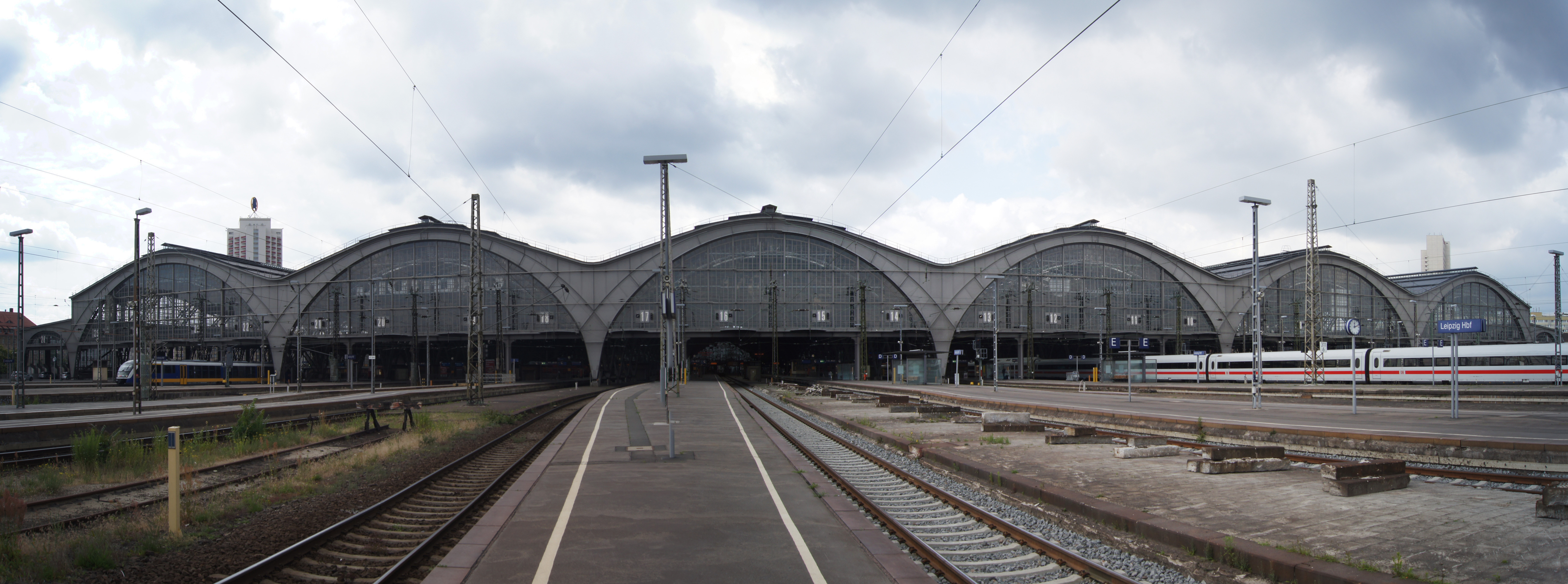
Train shed

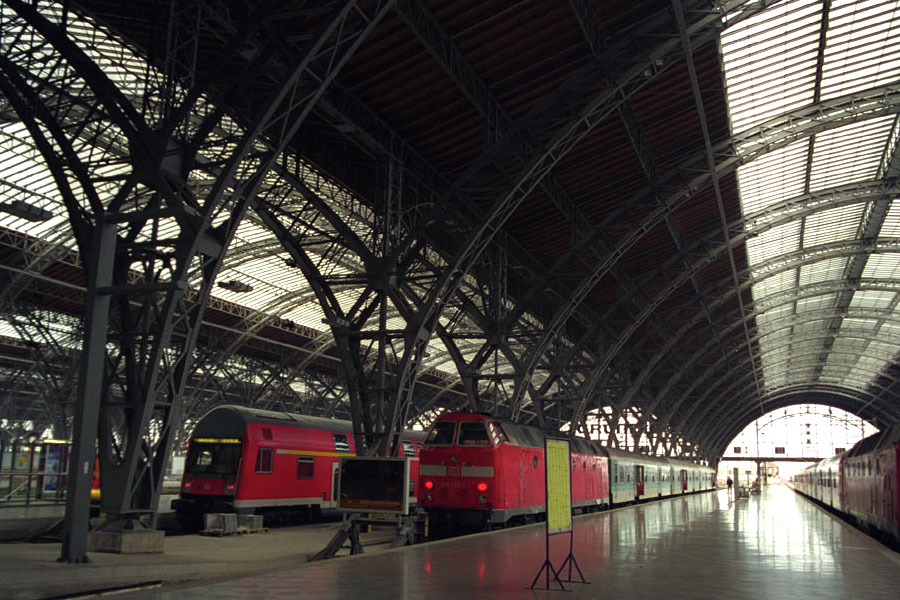
Inside the train shed

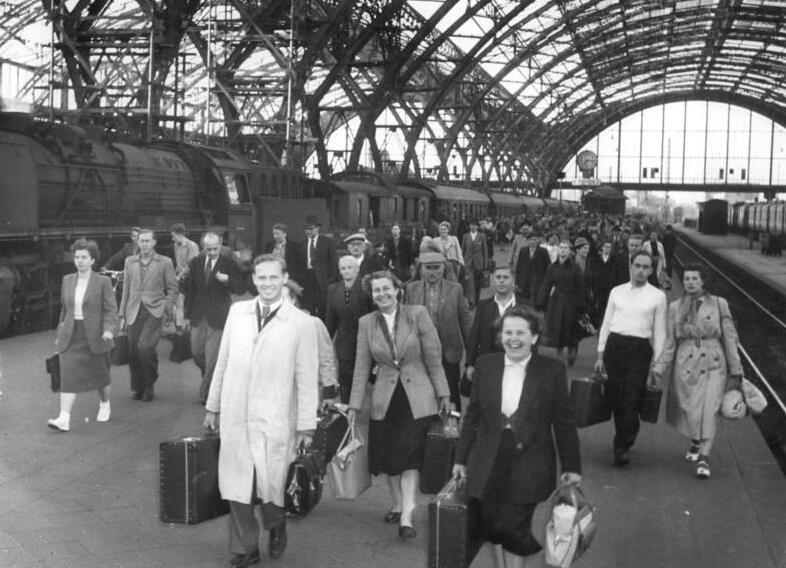
Inside the sheds in 1954, before the glass shattered in the war had been replaced

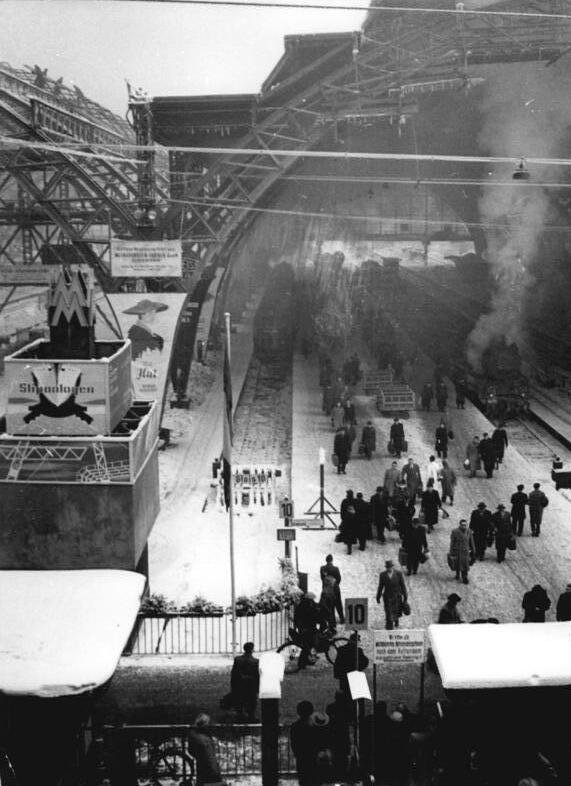
The ruined concourse in 1956, still open to the elements before rebuilding

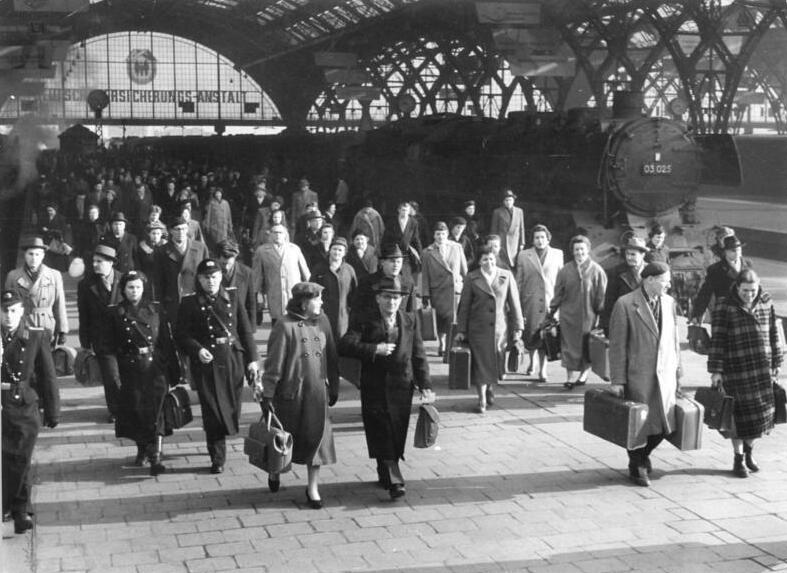
1957: Partially restored, but the concourse is still without a roof.

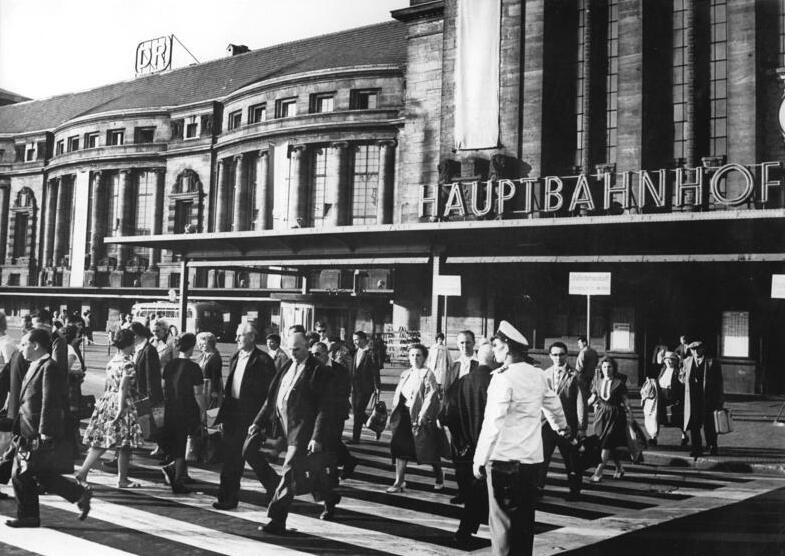
Exterior, 1962

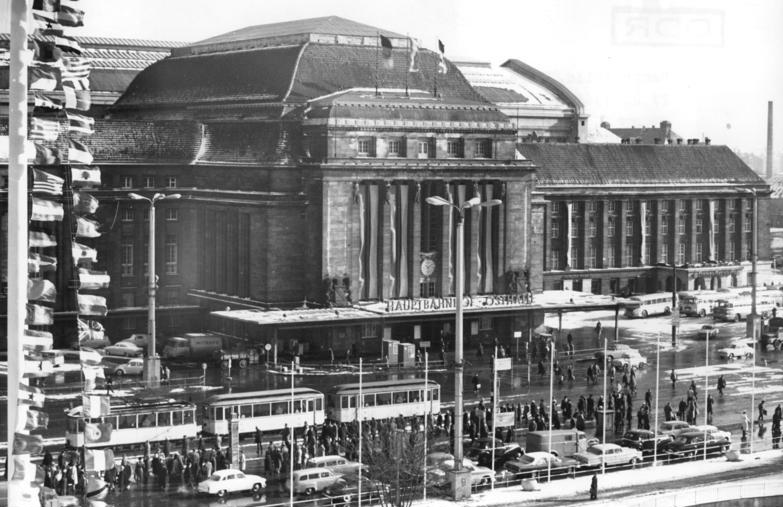
Exterior, 1965

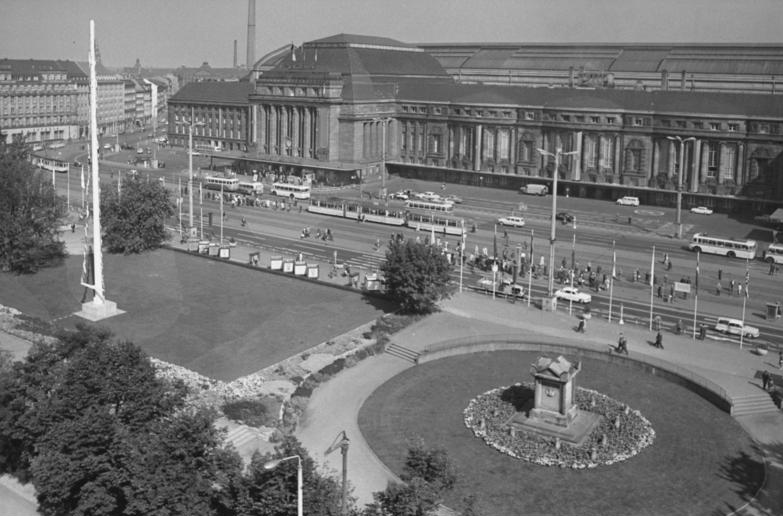
Exterior, 1965

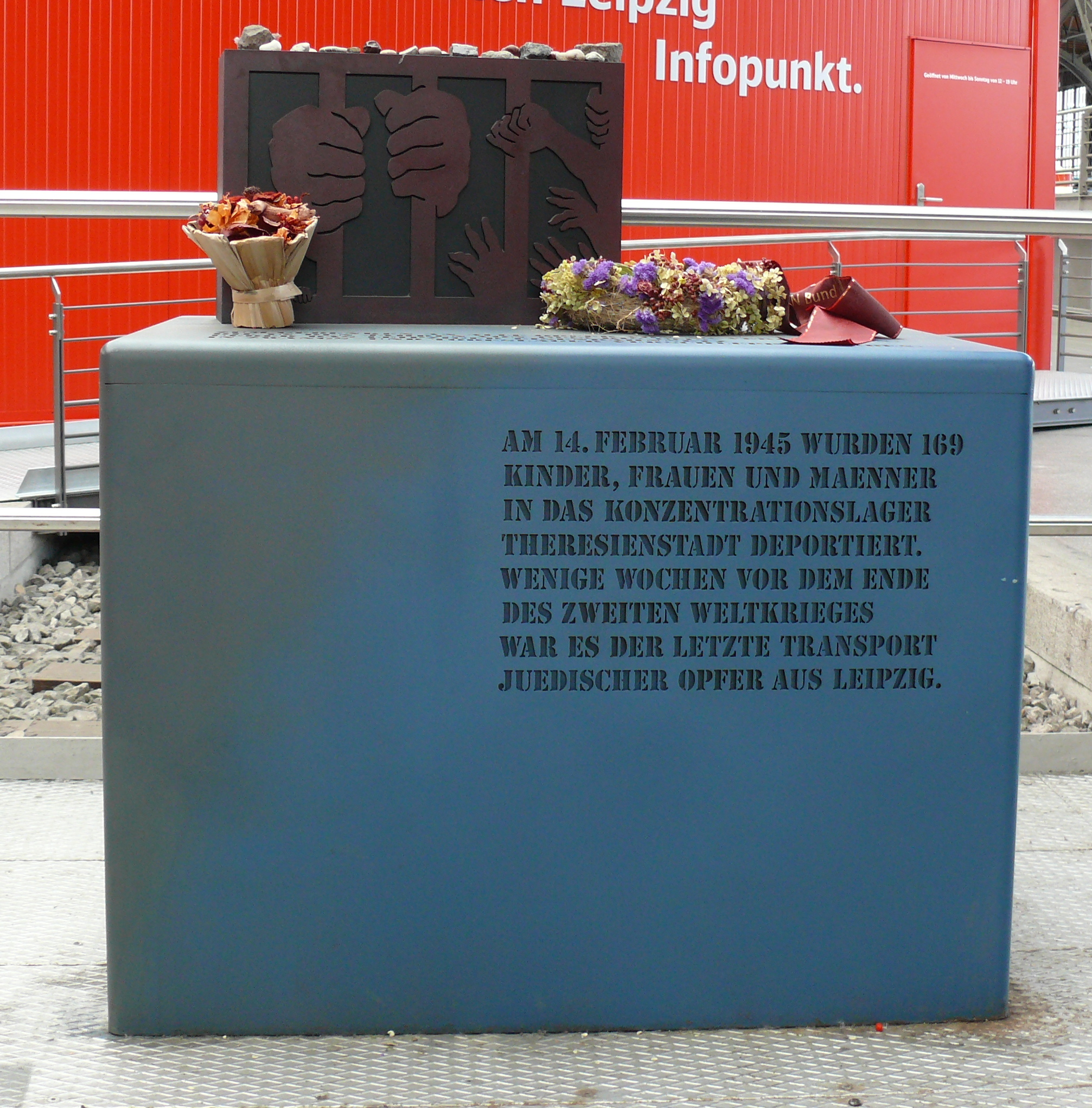
Holocaust memorial

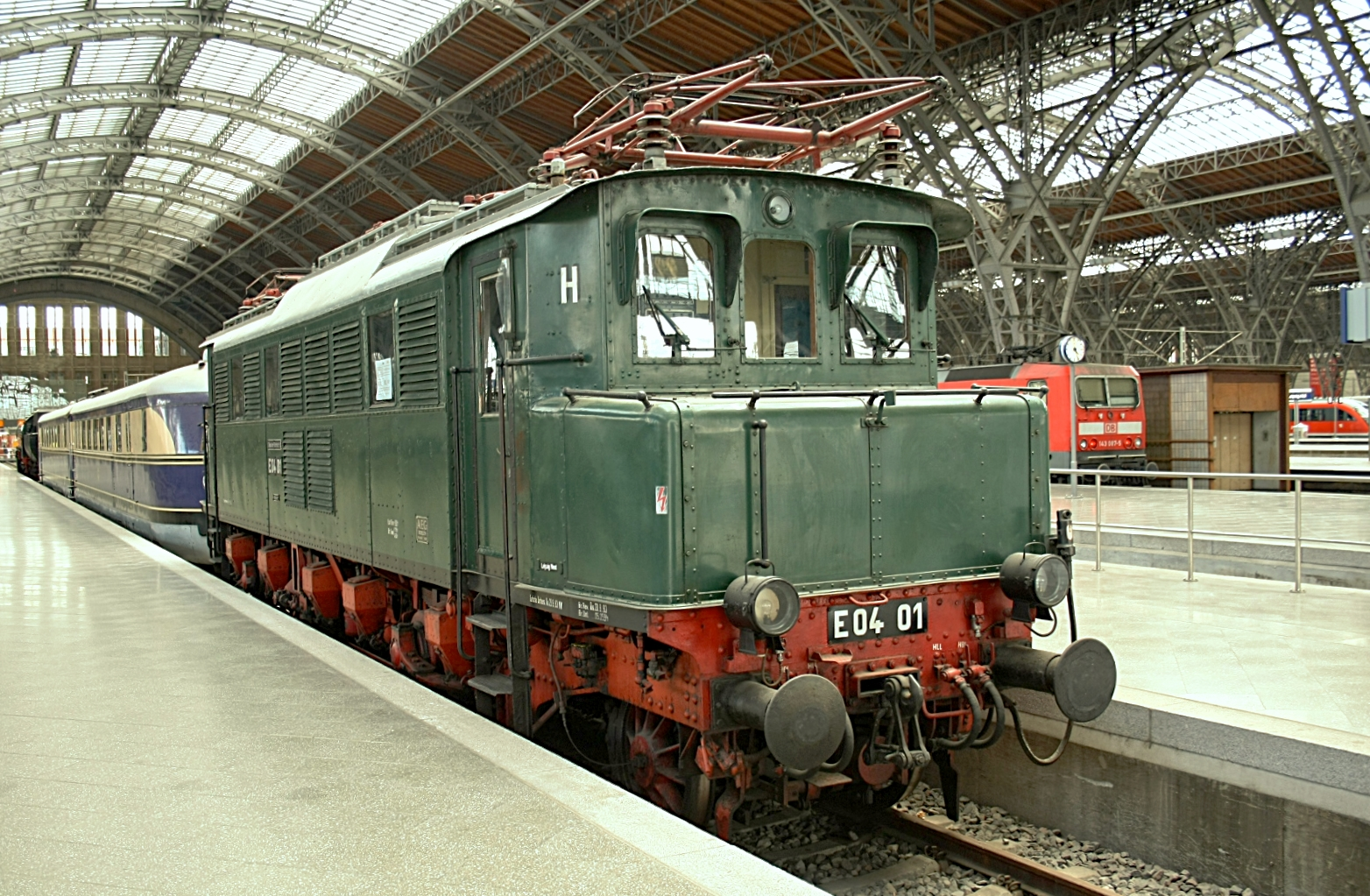
Electric locomotive on display

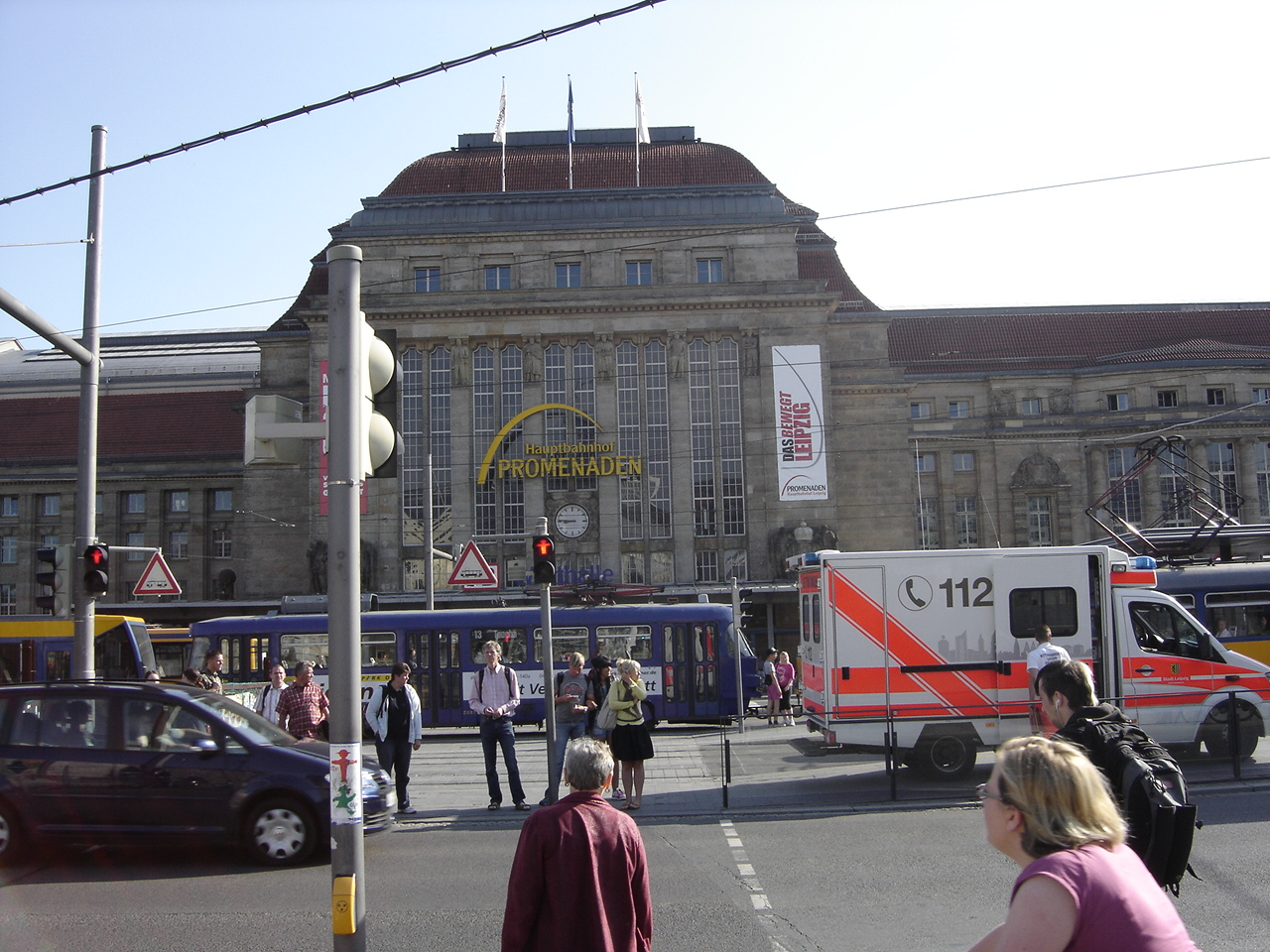
Exterior, 2010

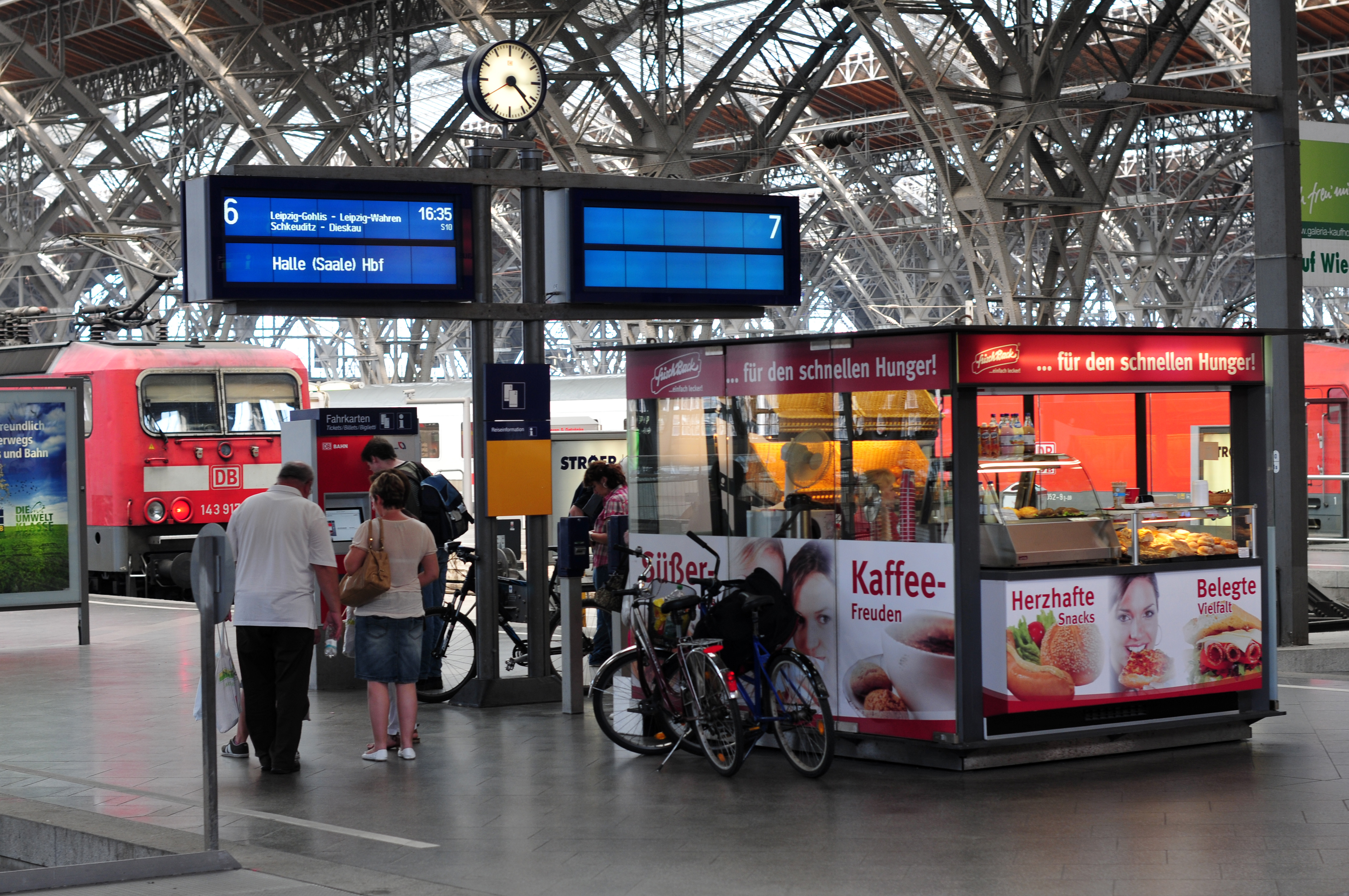

== See also ==
- Rail transport in Germany
- Railway stations in Germany
