= Leipzig–Großkorbetha railway =

Railway line in Germany

Leipzig Hbf–Großkorbetha
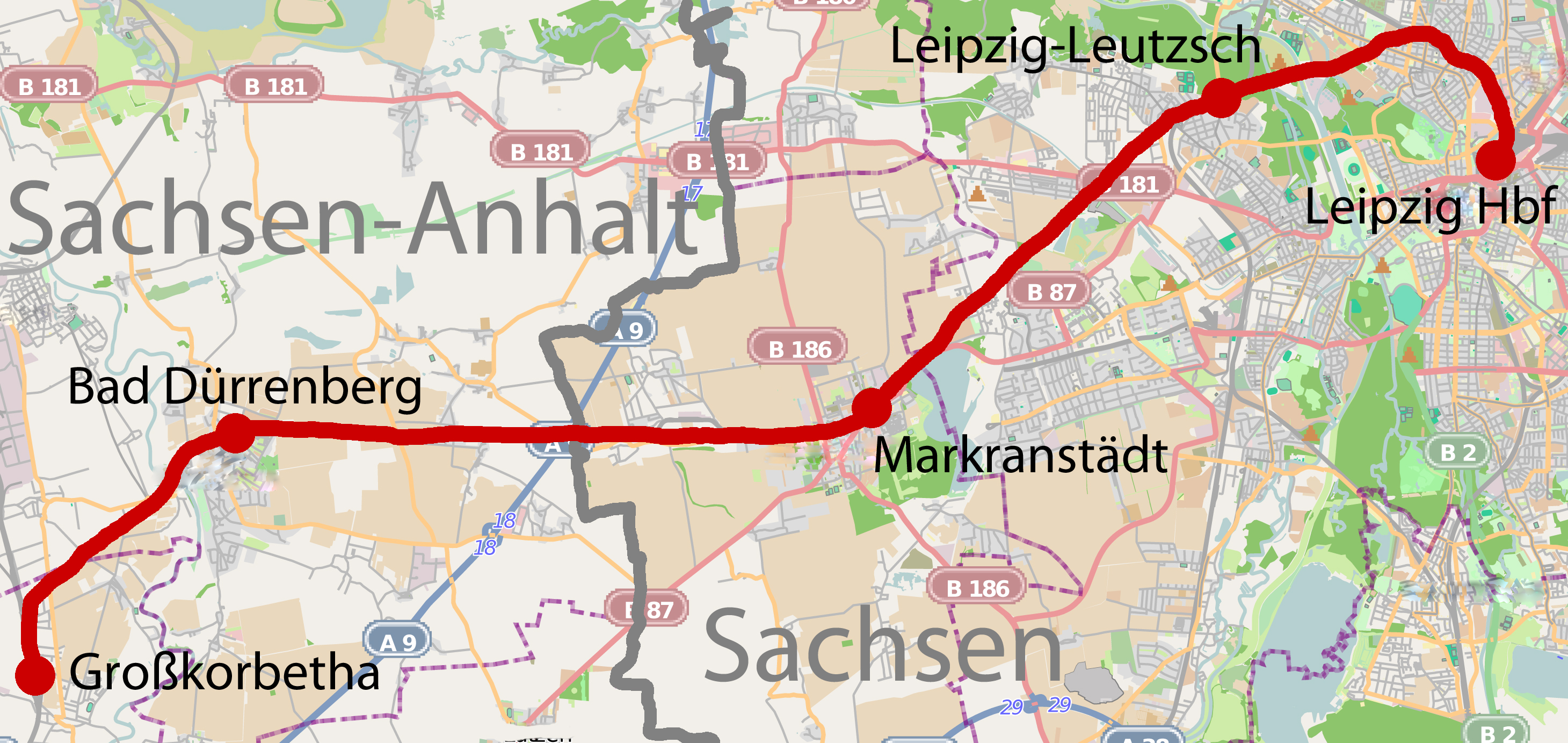

Overview
- Line number: 6367
- Locale: Saxony-Anhalt and Saxony, Germany

Service
- Route number: 582

Technical
- Line length: 32.21 km (20.01 mi)
- Track gauge: 1,435 mm (4 ft 8 1/2 in) standard gauge
- Minimum radius: 450 m (1,476 ft)
- Operating speed: 160 km/h (99.4 mph) (maximum)
- Maximum incline: 0.7%

The Leipzig–Großkorbetha railway is a double track electrified in the German states of Saxony-Anhalt and Saxony, which connects the city of Leipzig and the Thuringian Railway. It runs from Leipzig via Markranstädt and Bad Dürrenberg to Großkorbetha.

== History ==
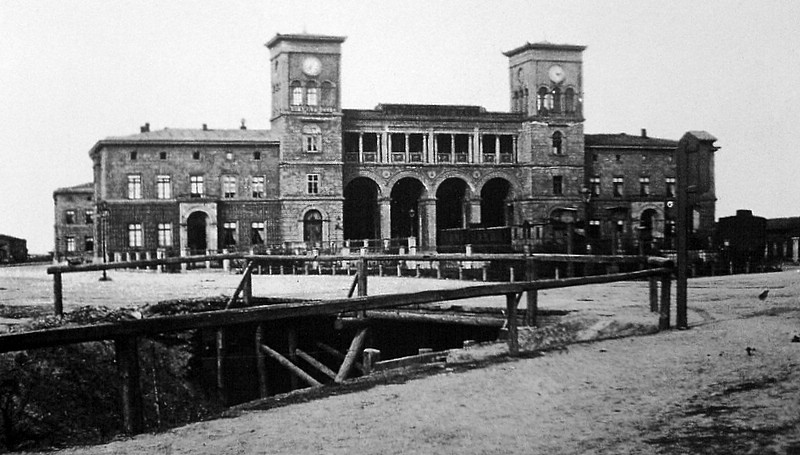
Thüringer Bahnhof in 1862

The line was opened on 22 March 1856 by the Thuringian Railway Company (German: Thüringische Eisenbahn-Gesellschaft) and is one of the oldest railways in Germany. At that time it started in the Thüringer Bahnhof (Thuringian station) in Leipzig, which was on the eastern edge of the site of the Leipzig Hauptbahnhof (central station), which opened in 1913. The line quickly developed into one of the busiest lines in central Germany.

The line was electrified on 2 November 1942, but four years later in 1946 the electrical equipment was taken down and moved to the Soviet Union as reparations for World War II. In 1964 it was re-electrified.

== Services ==
Currently it is served by Intercity-Express trains between Berlin and Munich and between Dresden and Frankfurt am Main. On the section to Leutzsch, regional services operate to Gera. From 1969 to 2013 there were operated as part of the Leipzig S-Bahn network. They have been operated as part of the S-Bahn Mitteldeutschland since December 2013. Regionalbahn RB-125 services also operate hourly between Leipzig, Großkorbetha and Weißenfels.
