= Leipzig =

Largest city in Saxony, Germany

Leipzig Leibz'sch (Upper Saxon)
- City
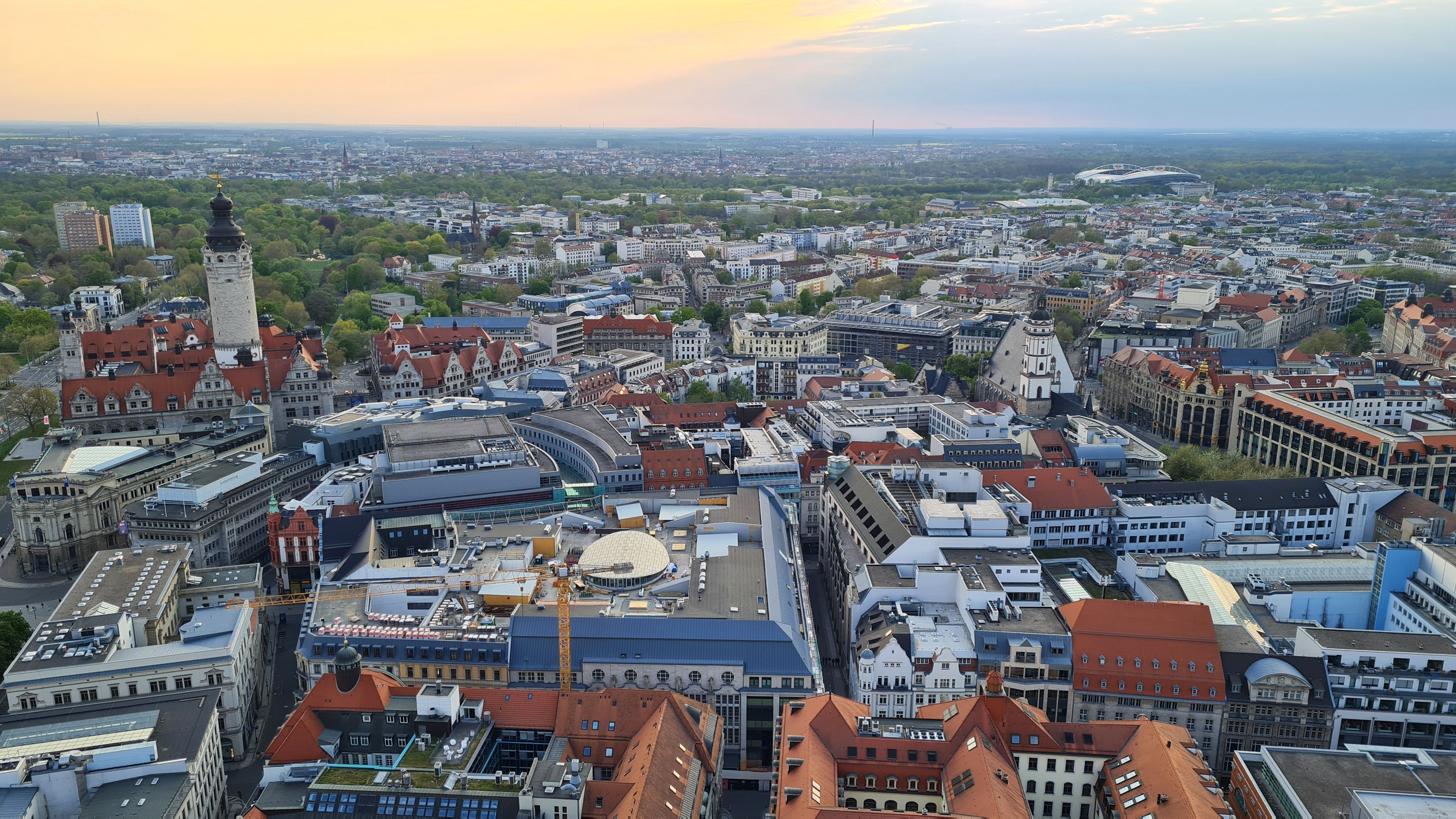
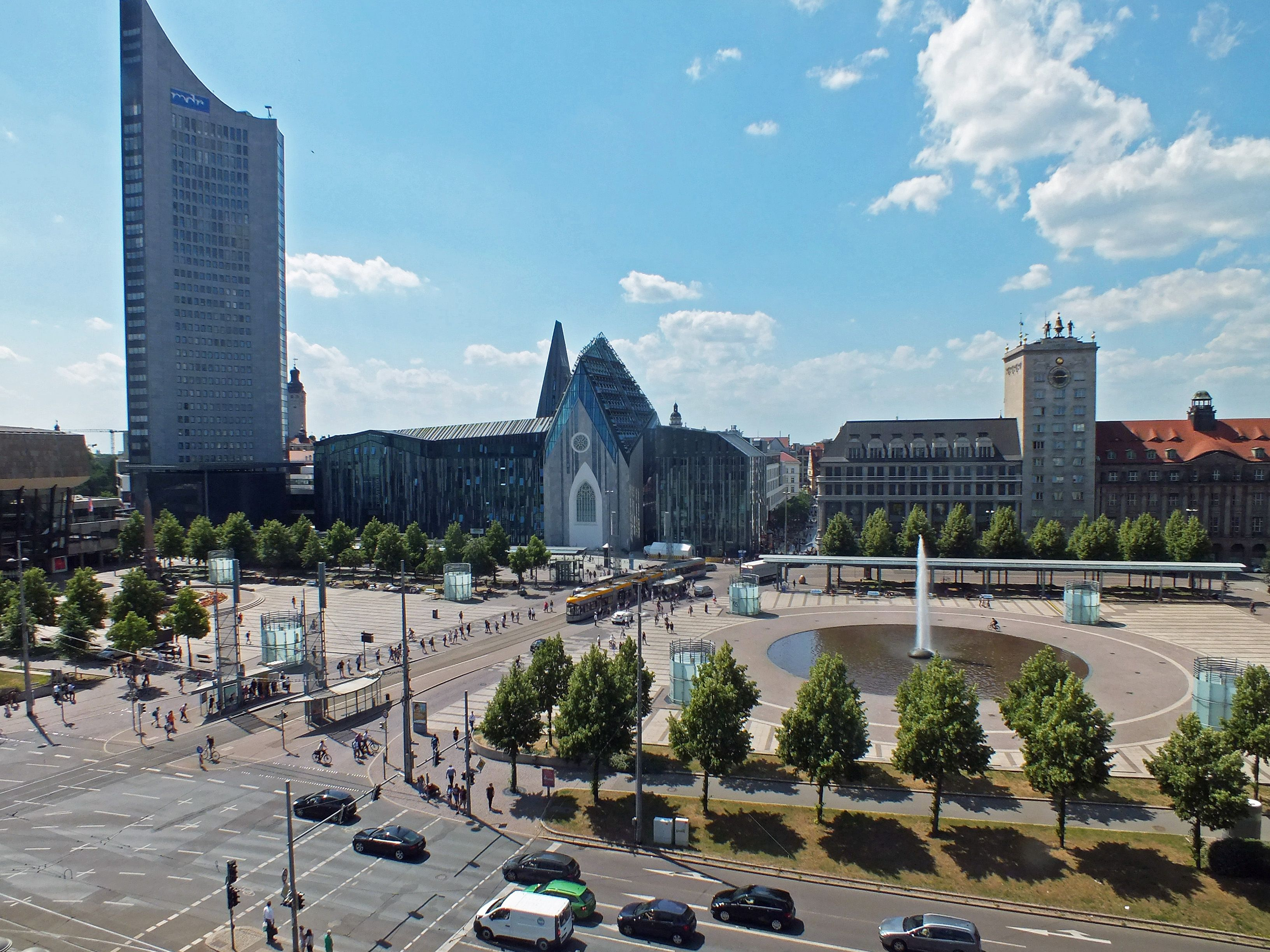
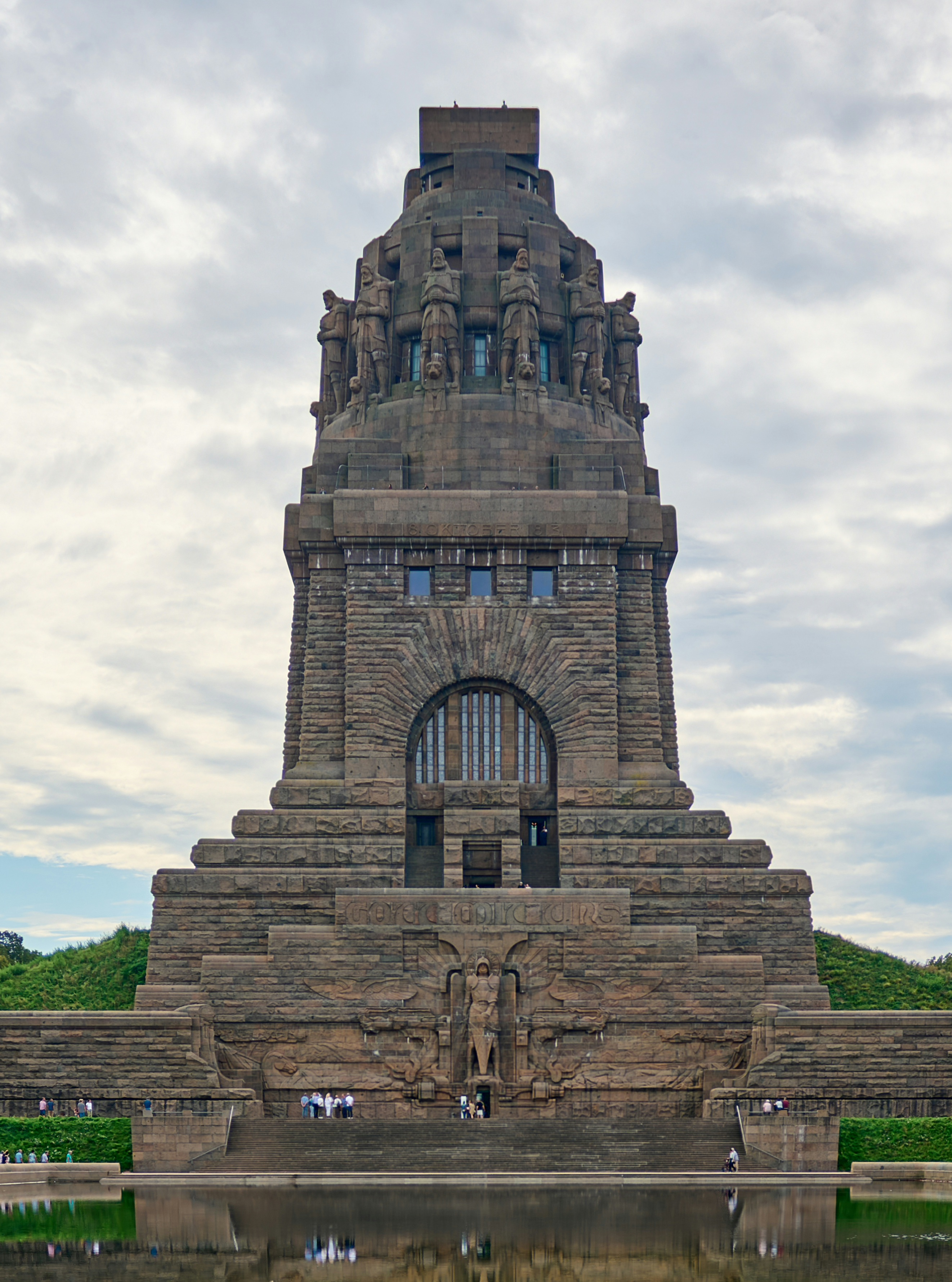
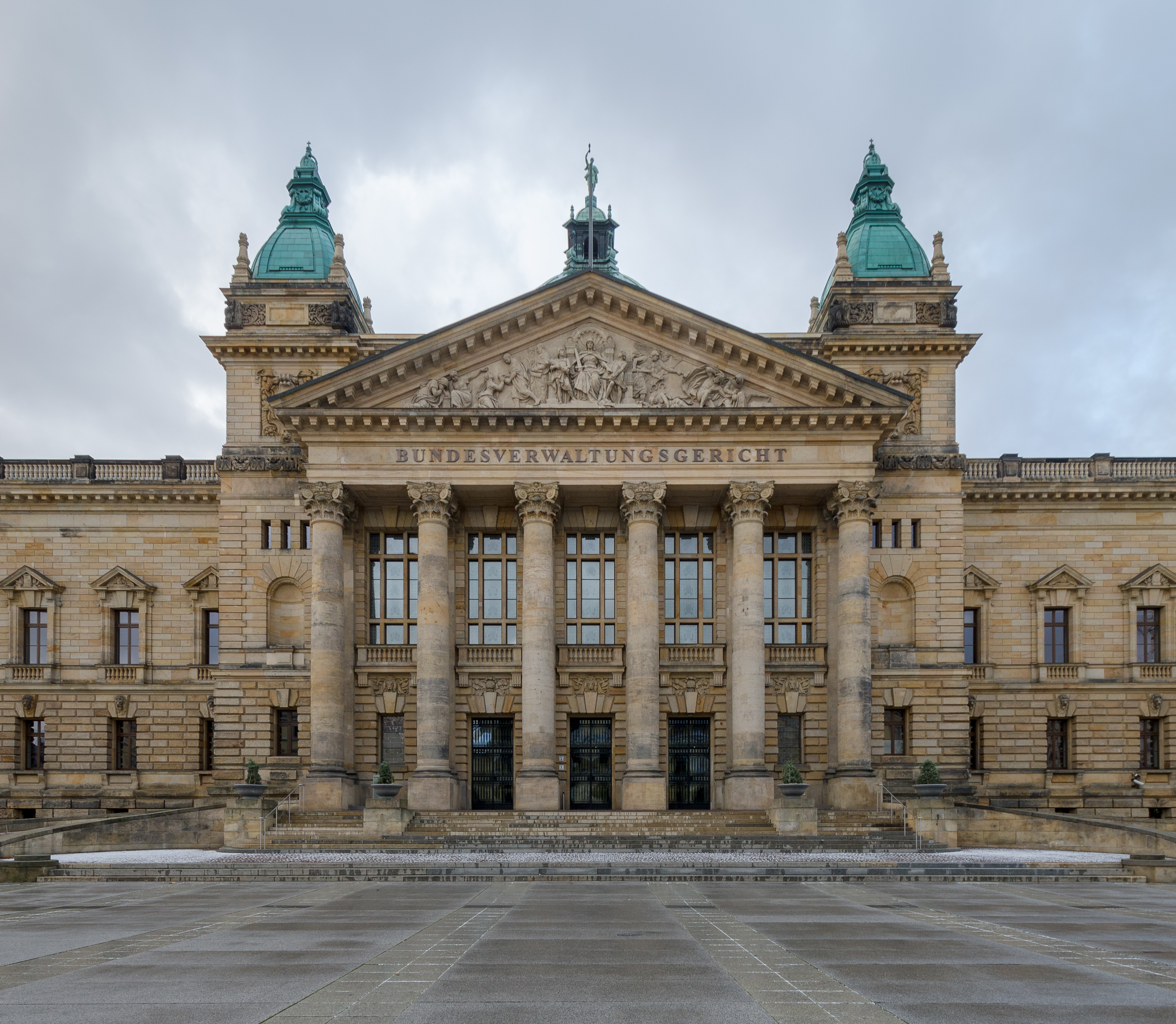
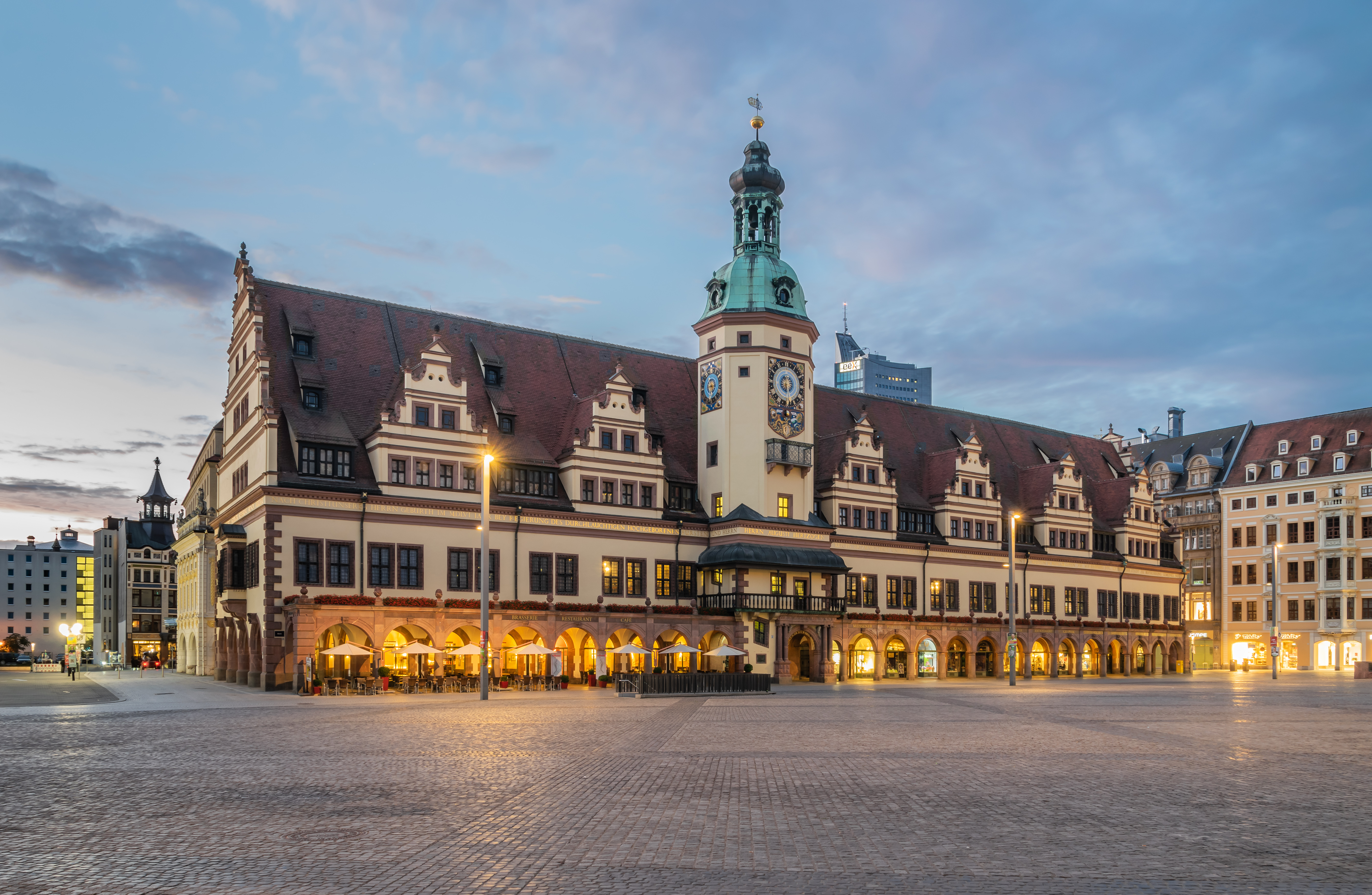
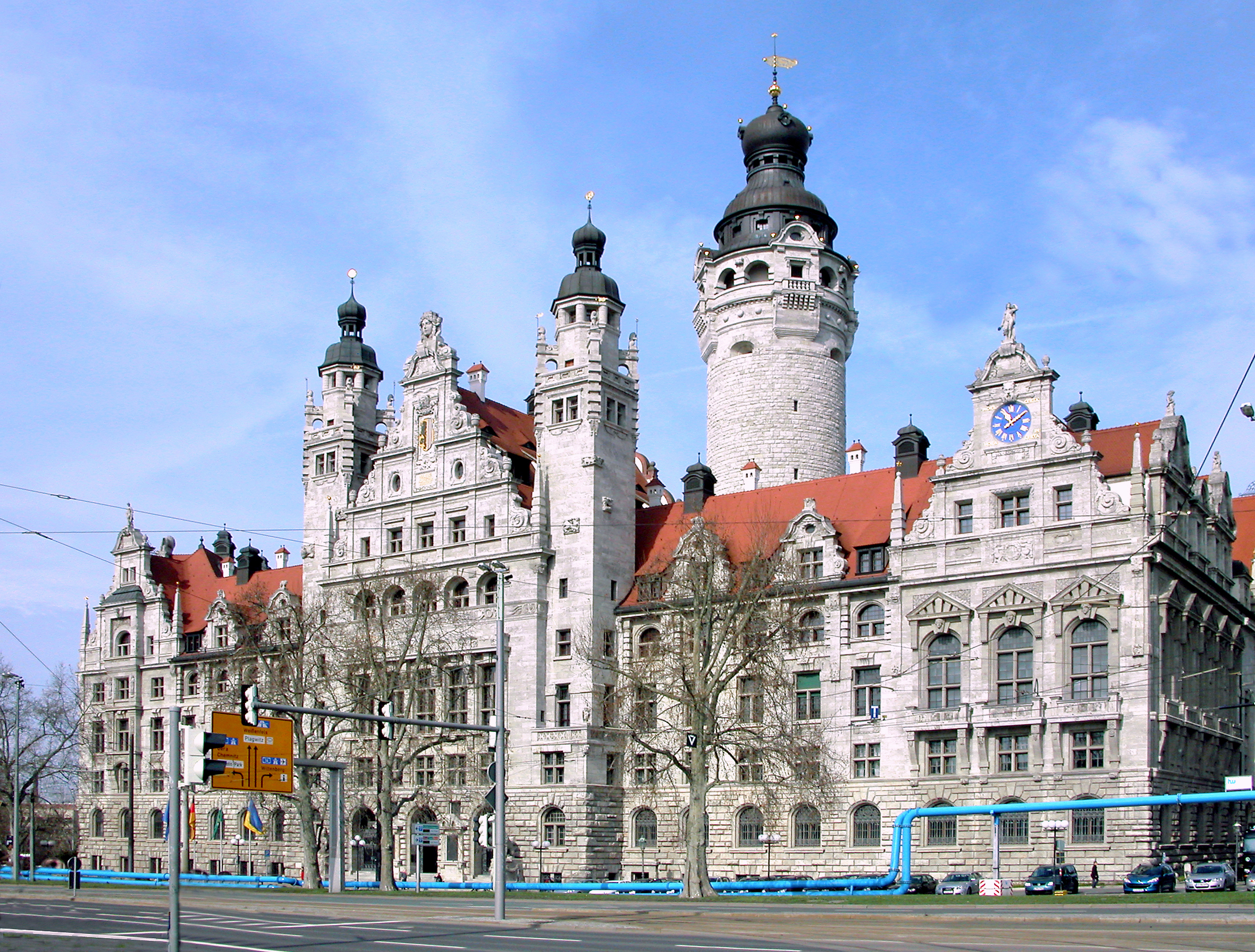
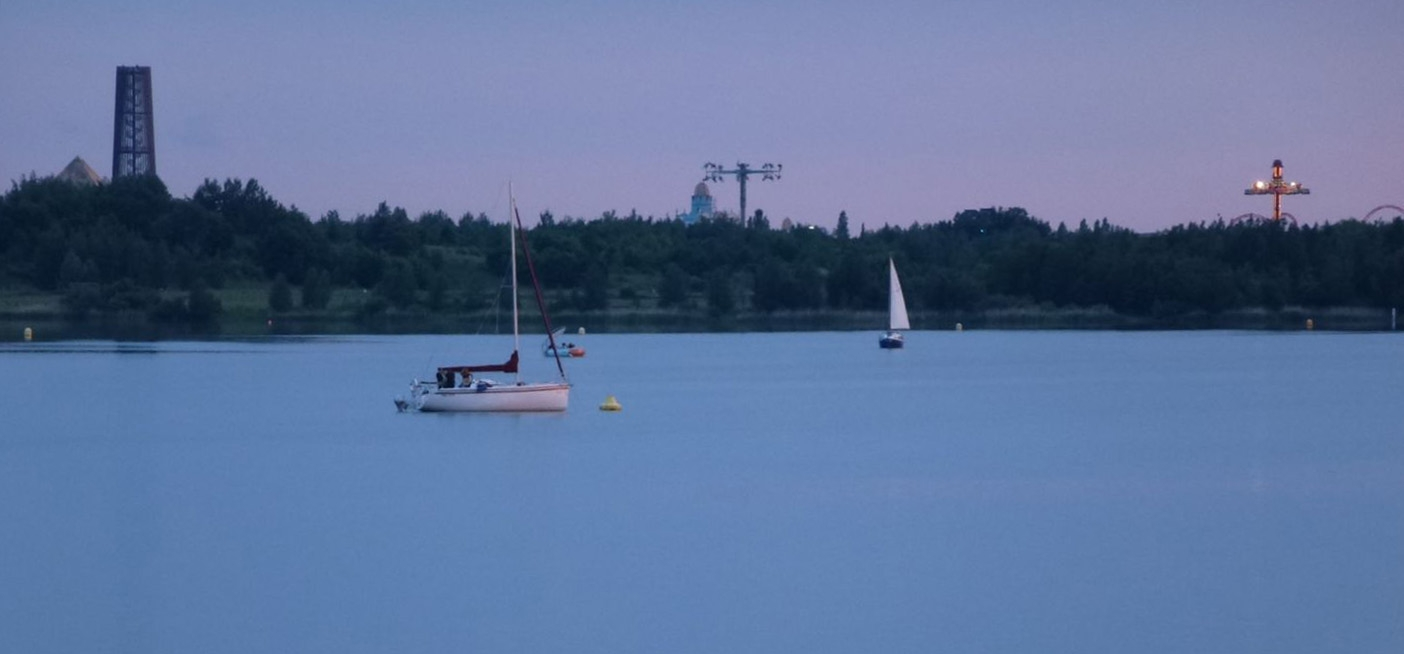
- View over Leipzig inner city Augustusplatz Völkerschlachtdenkmal BVerwG Old Town Hall New Town Hall Cospudener See at Neuseenland, Belantis amusement park in the background

- Flag Coat of arms
- Interactive map of Leipzig
- Location within Germany Location within Saxony
- Coordinates: 51°20′24″N 12°22′30″E
- Country: Germany
- State: Saxony
- District: Urban district

Government
  - Mayor (2020–27): Burkhard Jung (SPD)

Area
  - City: 297.8 km^{2} (115.0 sq mi)

Population (2025-12-31)
  - City: 615,932
  - Density: 2,068/km^{2} (5,357/sq mi)
  - Metro: 1,001,220 (LUZ)
- Time zone: UTC+01:00 (CET)
  - Summer (DST): UTC+02:00 (CEST)
- Postal codes: 04001–04357
- Dialling codes: 0341
- Vehicle registration: L
- Website: leipzig.de

Leipzig (Note: /ˈlaɪpsɪɡ, -sɪx/ LYPE-sig, -sikh; German: [ˈlaɪptsɪç]; Upper Saxon: Leibz'sch) is the most populous city in the German state of Saxony. The city has a population of 633,592 residents as of 31 December 2025. It is the eighth-largest city in Germany and is part of the Central German Metropolitan Region. Leipzig is located about 150 km (90 mi) southwest of Berlin, in the southernmost part of the North German Plain (the Leipzig Bay), at the confluence of the White Elster and its tributaries Pleiße and Parthe.

Leipzig has been a trade city since at least the time of the Holy Roman Empire. Via Regia and the Via Imperii, two important medieval trade routes, intersected here, marking the city's economic importance. The Leipzig Trade Fair dates back to 1190. Between 1764 and 1945, the city was a centre of publishing. After the Second World War, Leipzig remained a major urban centre in East Germany. Events in Leipzig in 1989 played a significant role in precipitating the fall of Communism in Europe, mainly through demonstrations starting from St. Nicholas Church. Since the early 2000s, Leipzig has experienced substantial transformation, marked by urban and economic revitalisation as well as the modernisation of its transport infrastructure.

Leipzig is home to one of the oldest universities in Europe (Leipzig University). It is the main seat of the German National Library, and the seat of the German Music Archive and the German Federal Administrative Court. Leipzig Zoo is one of the most modern zoos in Europe and as of 2018 ranks first in Germany and second in Europe. Leipzig's late-19th-century Gründerzeit architecture consists of around 12,500 buildings. The city's central railway terminus Leipzig Hauptbahnhof is Europe's largest railway station measured by floor area. Since Leipzig City Tunnel came into operation in 2013, it has formed the centrepiece of the S-Bahn Mitteldeutschland (S-Bahn Central Germany) public transit system, Germany's largest S-Bahn network.

Leipzig has long been a major centre for music, including classical and modern dark wave. The Thomanerchor (English: St. Thomas Choir of Leipzig), a boys' choir, was founded in 1212. The Leipzig Gewandhaus Orchestra, established in 1743, is one of the oldest symphony orchestras in the world. Several well-known composers lived and worked in Leipzig, including Johann Sebastian Bach, Felix Mendelssohn, and Richard Wagner. The University of Music and Theatre "Felix Mendelssohn Bartholdy" was founded in 1843. The Oper Leipzig, one of the most prominent opera houses in Germany, was founded in 1693. During a stay in Gohlis, which is now part of the city, Friedrich Schiller wrote his poem "Ode to Joy".

== Names ==
A once common English spelling of the city's name was Leipsic, among many variants. The Latin name Lipsia was also used in many languages and in the academic publications of the city's university.

=== Etymology ===
The name Leipzig is commonly held to derive from lipa, the common Slavic designation for linden trees, making the city's name etymologically related to Lipetsk, Russia. Based on medieval attestations like Lipzk (c. 1190), the original Slavic name of the city has been reconstructed as *Lipьsko, which is also reflected in similar forms in neighbouring modern Slavic languages (Sorbian/Polish Lipsk, Czech Lipsko). This has, however, been questioned by more recent onomastic research based on the very oldest forms like Libzi (c. 1015).

The archaic Romanian name of Leipzig, Lipsca, is also derived from a Slavic form. Lipscani, a historical district in the center of Bucharest, is named after it.

=== Epithets ===
Due to the etymology mentioned above, Lindenstadt or Stadt der Linden (City of Linden Trees) are common poetic epithets for the city.

Another, somewhat old-fashioned epithet is Pleiß-Athen (Athens on the Pleiße River), hinting at Leipzig's long academic and literary tradition, as the seat of one of the oldest German universities and a centre of the book trade.

It is also referred to as "Little Paris" (Klein-Paris) after a line from Goethe's Faust I, which is partly set in the famous Leipzig restaurant Auerbachs Keller.

In 1937 the Nazi government awarded the city the epithet Reichsmessestadt Leipzig (Reich Trade Fair City Leipzig).

In 1989 Leipzig was dubbed a Hero City (Heldenstadt), a title that the Soviet Union awarded to some of its cities for their key role in World War II. In Leipzig's case, though, this was an informal allusion to its role in the fall of the East German regime (through the Monday demonstrations).

In 2013 Die Zeit nicknamed the city Hypezig, or the "Boomtown of eastern Germany", due to its vibrancy, creative scene and startups.

== Geography ==
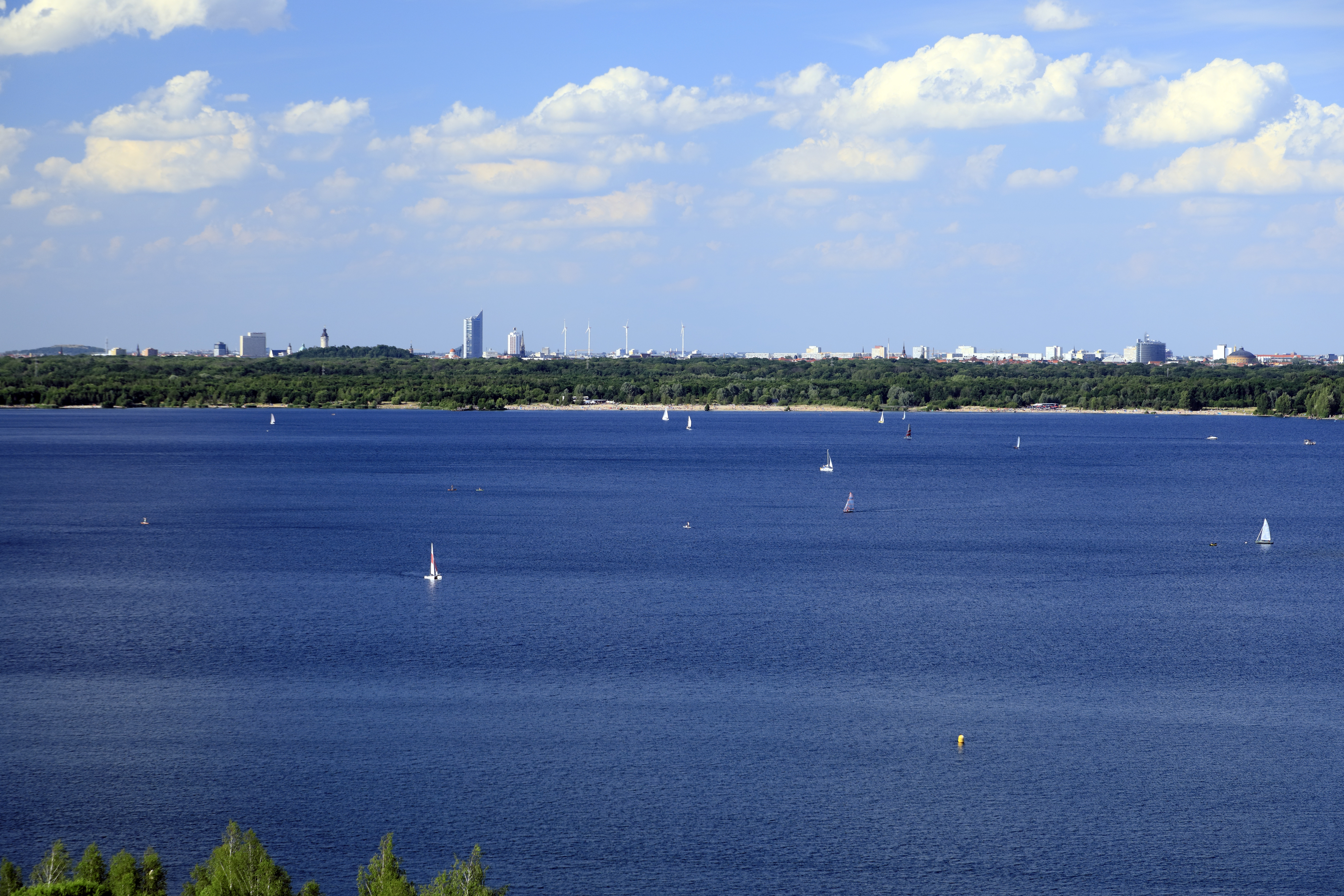
The skyline of Leipzig seen from Cospudener See in the Neuseenland

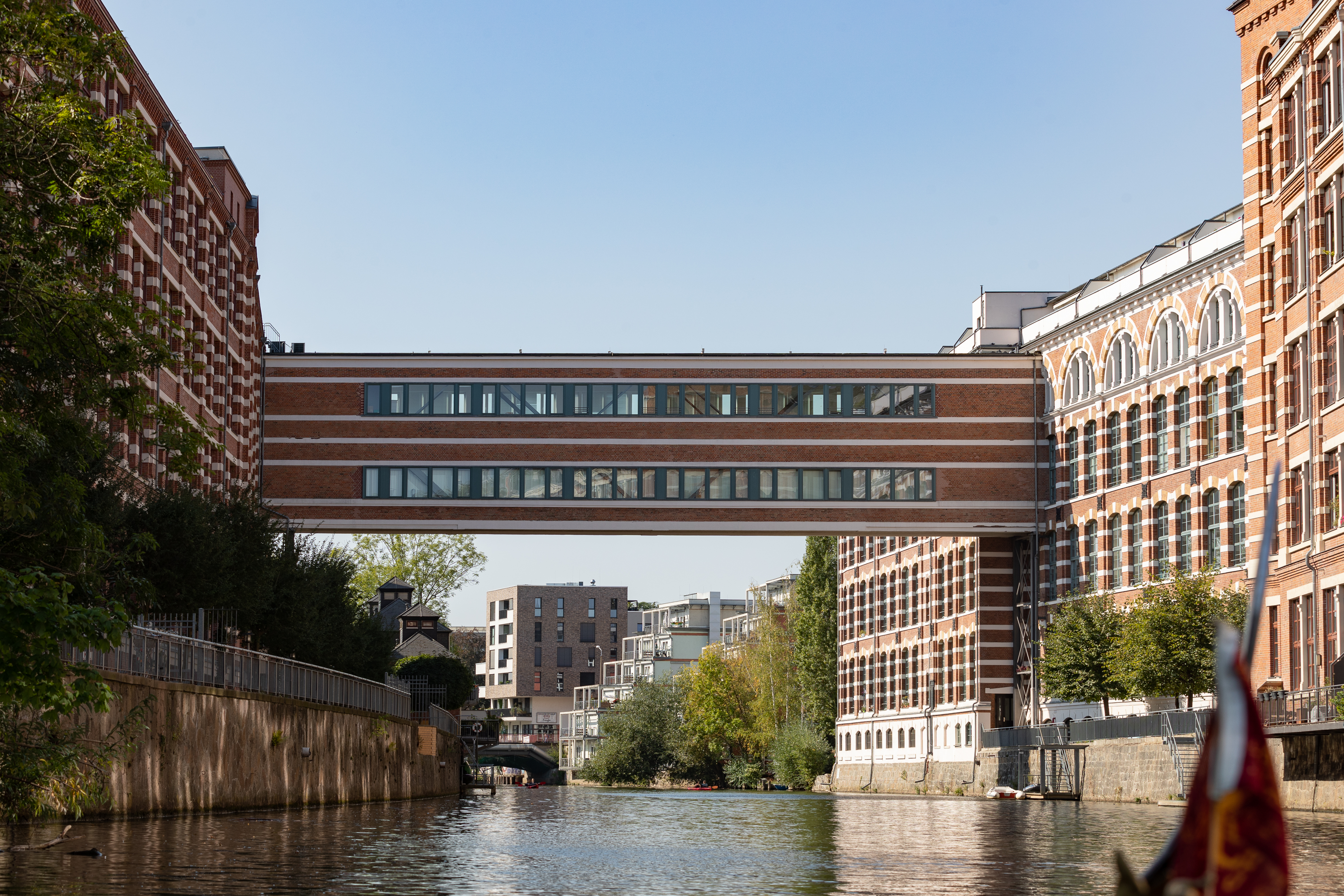
The White Elster in the Plagwitz district of Leipzig

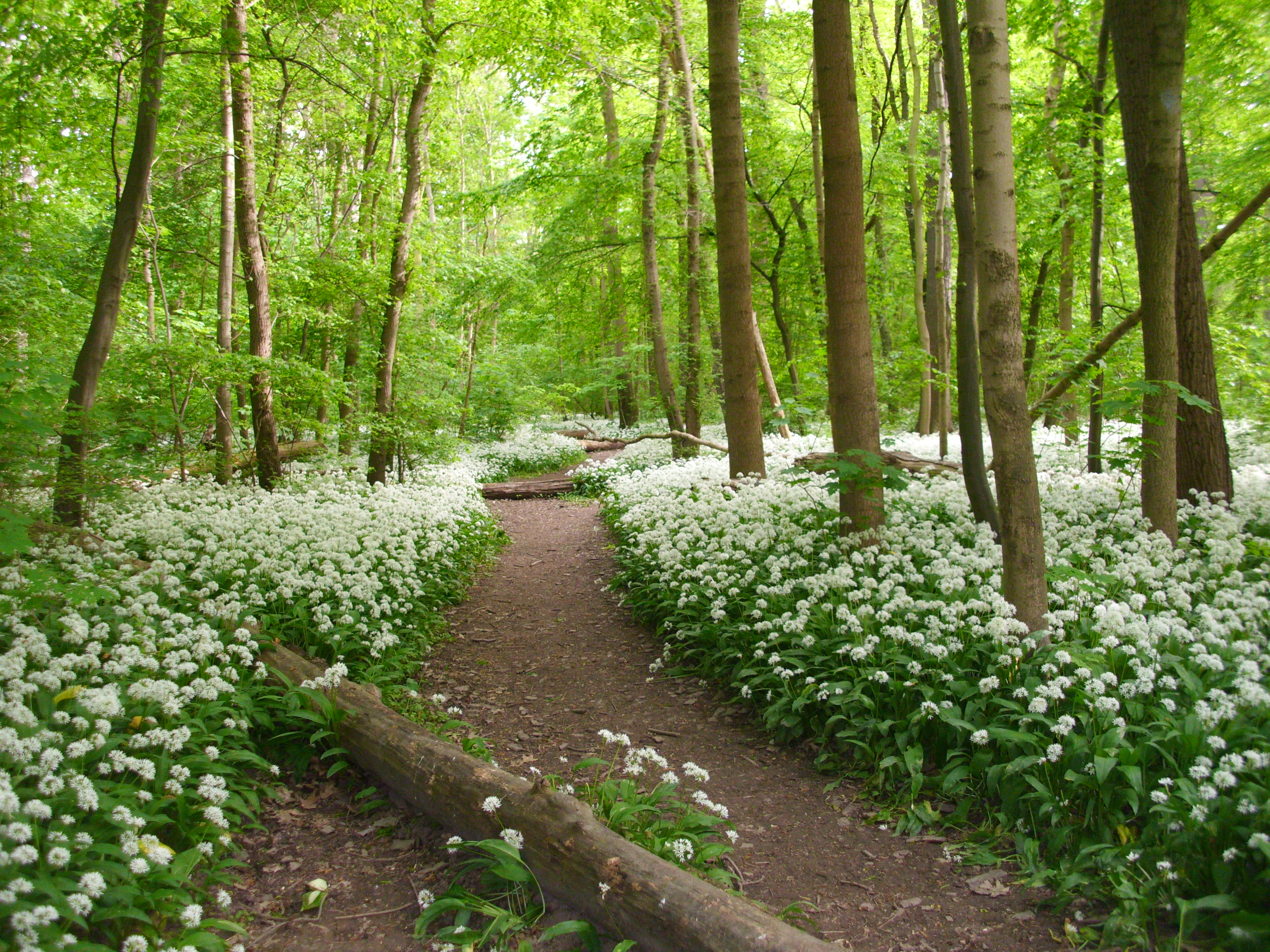
An impression of the Leipzig Riparian Forest (Leipziger Auenwald)

=== Location ===
Leipzig is located in the Leipzig Bay, the southernmost part of the North German Plain, which is the part of the North European Plain in Germany. The city sits on the White Elster, a river that rises in the Czech Republic and flows into the Saale south of Halle. The Pleiße and the Parthe join the White Elster in Leipzig, and the large inland delta-like landscape the three rivers form is called Leipziger Gewässerknoten. The site is characterized by swampy areas such as the Leipzig Riparian Forest (Leipziger Auenwald), though there are also some limestone areas to the north of the city. The landscape is mostly flat, though there is also some evidence of moraine and drumlins.

Although there are some forest parks within the city limits, the area surrounding Leipzig is relatively unforested. During the 20th century, there were several open-pit mines in the region, many of which have been converted to lakes.

Leipzig is also situated at the intersection of the ancient roads known as the Via Regia (King's highway), which traversed Germany in an east–west direction, and the Via Imperii (Imperial highway), a north–south road.

Leipzig was a walled city in the Middle Ages and the current "ring" road around the historic centre of the city follows the line of the old city walls.

=== Subdivision ===
Since 1992 Leipzig has been divided administratively into ten Stadtbezirke (boroughs), which in turn contain a total of 63 Ortsteile (localities). Some of these correspond to outlying villages which have been annexed by Leipzig.

Stadtbezirke and Ortsteile of Leipzig

Stadtbezirke of Leipzig
| Stadtbezirk | Pop. (2020) | Area km^{2} | Pop. per km^{2} | Ortsteile |
|---|---|---|---|---|
| Mitte | 65,912 | 13.96 | 4,721 | Zentrum, Zentrum-Ost, Zentrum-Südost, Zentrum-Süd, Zentrum-West, Zentrum-Nordwest, Zentrum-Nord |
| Nordost | 48,227 | 26.31 | 1,833 | Schönefeld-Abtnaundorf, Schönefeld-Ost, Mockau-Süd, Mockau-Nord, Thekla, Plaußig-Portitz |
| Ost | 85,519 | 40.73 | 2,100 | Neustadt-Neuschönefeld, Volkmarsdorf, Anger-Crottendorf, Sellerhausen-Stünz, Paunsdorf, Heiterblick, Engelsdorf/Sommerfeld, Althen, Baalsdorf, Kleinpösna/Hirschfeld, Mölkau |
| Südost | 62,506 | 34.72 | 1,800 | Reudnitz-Thonberg, Stötteritz, Probstheida, Meusdorf, Holzhausen, Liebertwolkwitz |
| Süd | 67,079 | 16.95 | 3,957 | Südvorstadt, Connewitz, Marienbrunn, Lößnig, Dölitz-Dösen |
| Südwest | 55,742 | 46.56 | 1,197 | Schleußig, Plagwitz, Kleinzschocher, Großzschocher, Knautkleeberg-Knauthain, Hartmannsdorf-Knautnaundorf |
| West | 54,190 | 14.69 | 3,689 | Schönau, Grünau-Ost, Grünau-Mitte, Grünau-Siedlung, Lausen-Grünau, Grünau-Nord, Miltitz |
| Alt-West | 59,643 | 26.21 | 2,276 | Lindenau, Altlindenau, Neulindenau, Leutzsch, Böhlitz-Ehrenberg, Burghausen, Rückmarsdorf |
| Nordwest | 34,710 | 39.07 | 888 | Möckern, Wahren, Lindenthal, Breitenfeld, Lützschena, Stahmeln |
| Nord | 71,878 | 38.61 | 1,862 | Gohlis-Süd, Gohlis-Mitte, Gohlis-Nord, Eutritzsch, Seehausen, Göbschelwitz, Hohenheida, Gottscheina, Wiederitzsch |

=== Neighbouring communities ===
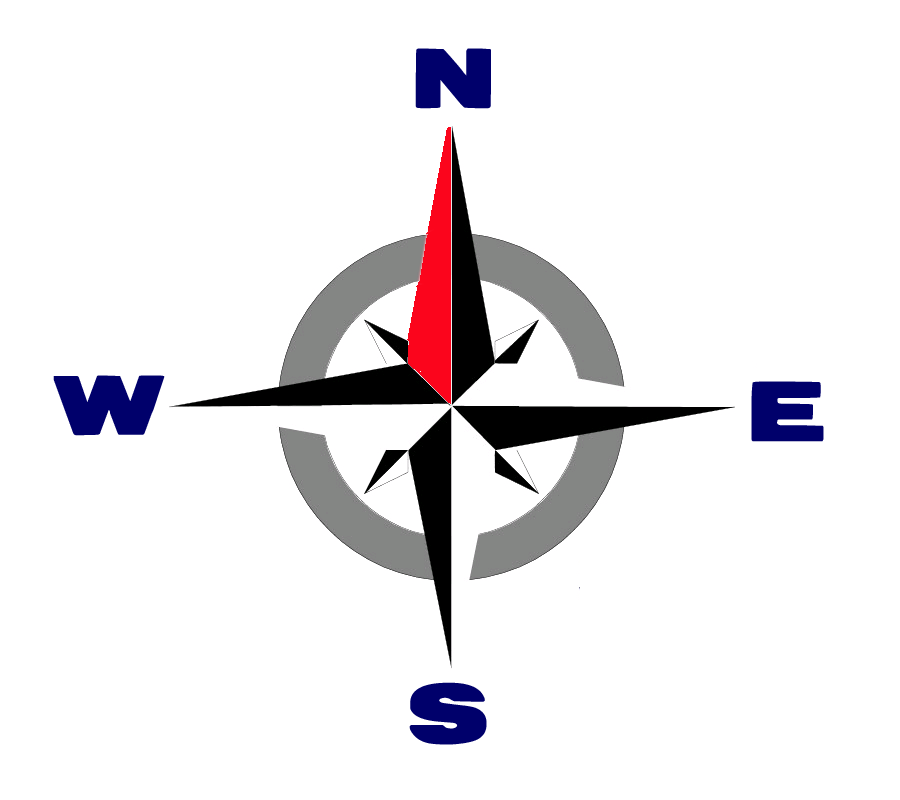
| | Delitzsch | Jesewitz |
| Schkeuditz | Rackwitz | Taucha |
| | | Borsdorf | Brandis |
| Markranstädt | Markkleeberg | Naunhof |
| Kitzen | Zwenkau | Grosspoesna |

=== Climate ===
Like many cities in Eastern Germany, Leipzig has an oceanic climate (Köppen: Cfb), with significant continental influences due to its inland location. Winters are cold, with an average temperature of around 1 °C (34 °F). Summers are generally warm, averaging at 19 °C (66 °F) with daytime temperatures of 24 °C (75 °F). Precipitation in winter is about half that of the summer. The amount of sunshine differs significantly between winter and summer, with an average of around 51 hours of sunshine in December (1.7 hours per day) compared with 229 hours of sunshine in July (7.4 hours per day).

Climate data for Leipzig (Leipzig/Halle Airport) (1991–2020 normals, extremes 1973–2013)
| Month | Jan | Feb | Mar | Apr | May | Jun | Jul | Aug | Sep | Oct | Nov | Dec | Year |
|---|---|---|---|---|---|---|---|---|---|---|---|---|---|
| Record high °C (°F) | 15.9 (60.6) | 18.6 (65.5) | 23.0 (73.4) | 29.5 (85.1) | 31.9 (89.4) | 34.8 (94.6) | 36.6 (97.9) | 37.2 (99.0) | 34.9 (94.8) | 28.2 (82.8) | 18.7 (65.7) | 16.5 (61.7) | 37.2 (99.0) |
| Mean daily maximum °C (°F) | 3.6 (38.5) | 5.0 (41.0) | 9.1 (48.4) | 14.7 (58.5) | 19.1 (66.4) | 22.5 (72.5) | 25.0 (77.0) | 24.6 (76.3) | 19.7 (67.5) | 14.1 (57.4) | 8.0 (46.4) | 4.5 (40.1) | 14.2 (57.6) |
| Daily mean °C (°F) | 1.0 (33.8) | 1.7 (35.1) | 4.9 (40.8) | 9.6 (49.3) | 13.9 (57.0) | 17.3 (63.1) | 19.5 (67.1) | 19.2 (66.6) | 14.8 (58.6) | 9.9 (49.8) | 5.1 (41.2) | 2.0 (35.6) | 9.9 (49.8) |
| Mean daily minimum °C (°F) | −1.8 (28.8) | −1.5 (29.3) | 1.0 (33.8) | 4.4 (39.9) | 8.5 (47.3) | 11.9 (53.4) | 14.1 (57.4) | 14.0 (57.2) | 10.2 (50.4) | 6.2 (43.2) | 2.3 (36.1) | −0.6 (30.9) | 5.7 (42.3) |
| Record low °C (°F) | −27.6 (−17.7) | −21.6 (−6.9) | −16.6 (2.1) | −6.5 (20.3) | −2.6 (27.3) | 1.8 (35.2) | 5.7 (42.3) | 5.5 (41.9) | 0.5 (32.9) | −6.7 (19.9) | −12.9 (8.8) | −20.2 (−4.4) | −27.6 (−17.7) |
| Average precipitation mm (inches) | 33.4 (1.31) | 24.5 (0.96) | 36.5 (1.44) | 32.0 (1.26) | 51.2 (2.02) | 54.4 (2.14) | 75.8 (2.98) | 63.6 (2.50) | 50.5 (1.99) | 35.2 (1.39) | 40.4 (1.59) | 34.3 (1.35) | 531.9 (20.94) |
| Average precipitation days (≥ 1.0 mm) | 15.7 | 12.6 | 14.2 | 11.1 | 12.7 | 12.7 | 13.9 | 13.0 | 11.8 | 13.3 | 14.5 | 15.3 | 160.8 |
| Average snowy days (≥ 1.0 cm) | 8.1 | 7.7 | 3.7 | 0.6 | 0 | 0 | 0 | 0 | 0 | 0.1 | 1.4 | 4.9 | 26.5 |
| Average relative humidity (%) | 82.3 | 79.0 | 74.3 | 67.5 | 67.8 | 67.8 | 66.7 | 68.1 | 75.4 | 80.9 | 84.5 | 83.8 | 74.8 |
| Mean monthly sunshine hours | 61.9 | 81.0 | 128.5 | 190.9 | 231.4 | 229.9 | 233.9 | 219.6 | 163.9 | 119.3 | 64.9 | 53.3 | 1,748.8 |
Source 1: World Meteorological Organization
Source 2: Data derived from Deutscher Wetterdienst, note

== History ==
=== Origins ===
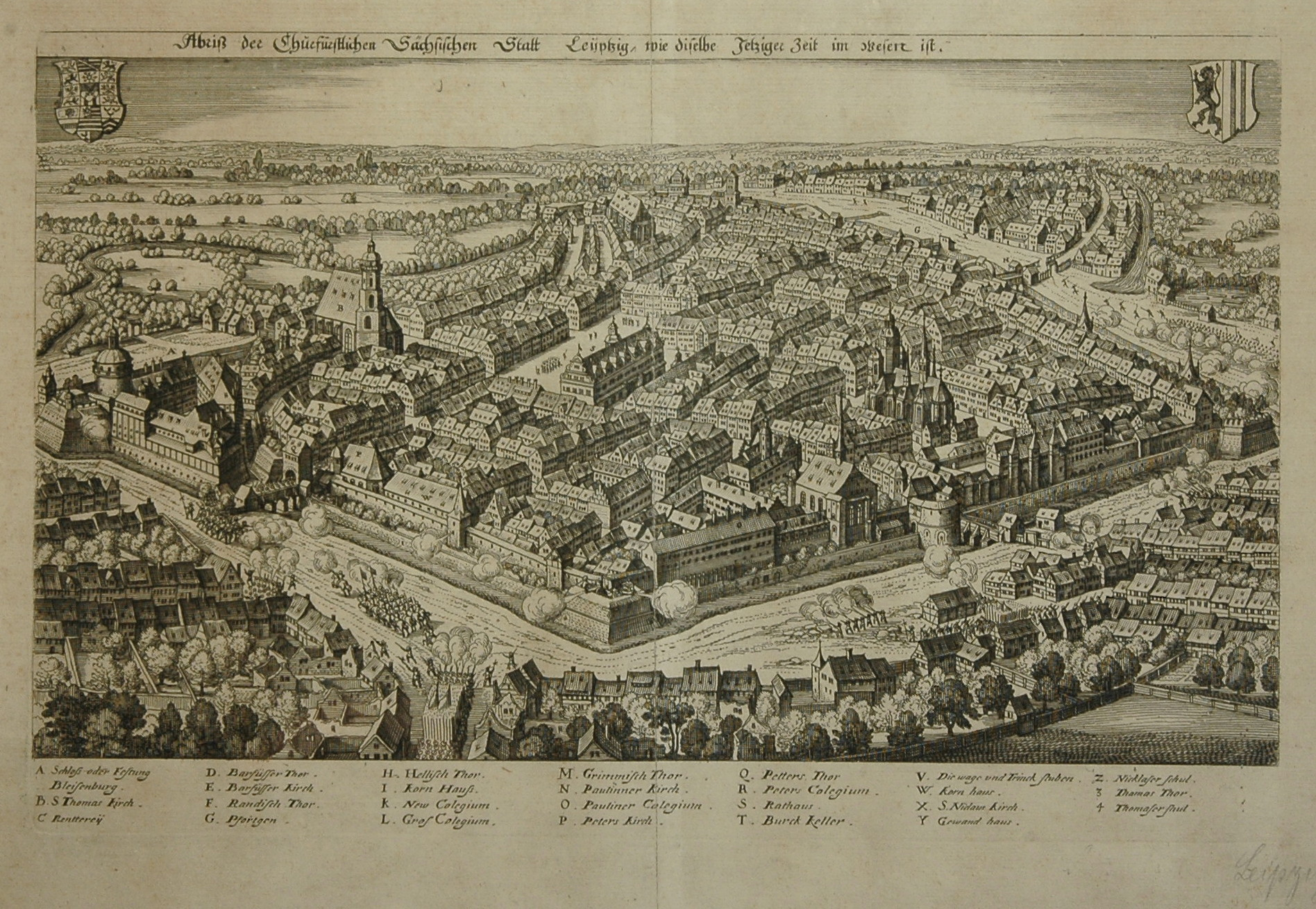
Leipzig in the 17th century

Leipzig was first documented in 1015 in the chronicles of Bishop Thietmar of Merseburg as urbs Libzi (Chronicon, VII, 25) and endowed with city and market privileges in 1165 by Otto the Rich. Leipzig Trade Fair, started in the Middle Ages, has become an event of international importance and is the oldest surviving trade fair in the world. This encouraged the growth of the Leipzig merchant bourgeoisie.

There are records of commercial fishing operations on the river Pleiße that, most likely, refer to Leipzig dating back to 1305, when the Margrave Dietrich the Younger granted the fishing rights to the church and convent of St Thomas.

There were a number of monasteries in and around the city, including a Franciscan monastery after which the Barfußgäßchen (Barefoot Alley) is named and a monastery of Irish monks (Jacobskirche, destroyed in 1544) near the present day Ranstädter Steinweg street (the old Via Regia).

The University of Leipzig was founded in 1409 and Leipzig developed into an important centre of German law and of the publishing industry in Germany, resulting, in the 19th and 20th centuries, with the Reichsgericht (Imperial Court of Justice) and the German National Library being located here.

During the Thirty Years' War, two battles took place in Breitenfeld, about 8 km (5 mi) outside Leipzig city walls. The first Battle of Breitenfeld took place in 1631 and the second in 1642. Both battles resulted in victories for the Swedish-led side.

On 24 December 1701, when Franz Conrad Romanus was mayor, an oil-fueled street lighting system was introduced. The city employed light guards who had to follow a specific schedule to ensure the punctual lighting of the 700 lanterns.

=== 19th century ===
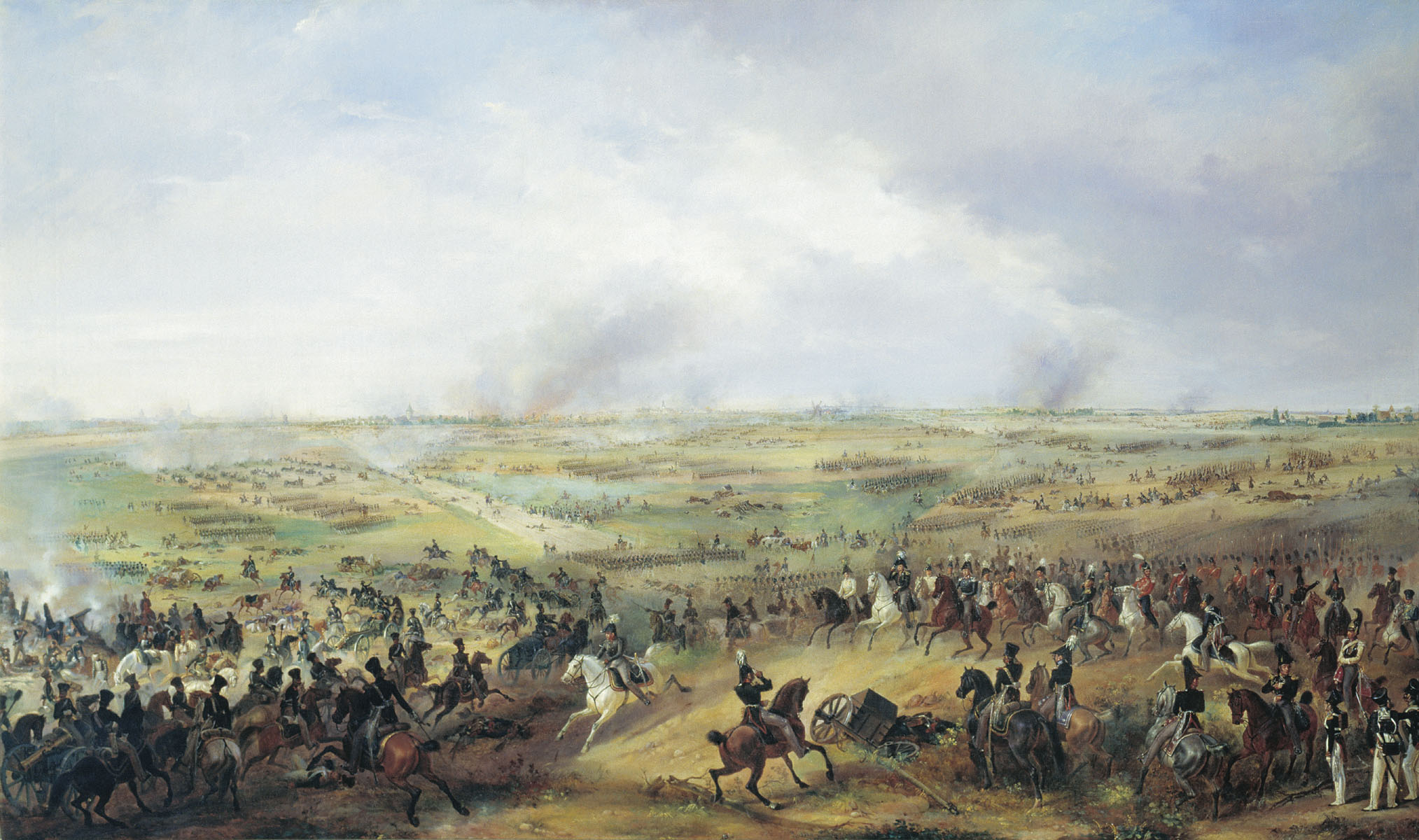
Battle of Leipzig, 1813

The Leipzig region was the arena of the 1813 Battle of Leipzig between Napoleonic France and an allied coalition of Prussia, Russia, Austria, and Sweden. It was the largest battle in Europe before the First World War and the coalition victory ended Napoleon's presence in Germany and would ultimately lead to his first exile on Elba. The Monument to the Battle of the Nations celebrating the centenary of this event was completed in 1913. In addition to stimulating German nationalism, the war had a major impact in mobilizing a civic spirit in numerous volunteer activities. Many volunteer militias and civic associations were formed, and collaborated with churches and the press to support local and state militias, patriotic wartime mobilization, humanitarian relief and postwar commemorative practices and rituals. While over half of the Kingdom of Saxony was formally ceded to Prussia, Leipzig remained part of King Frederick Augustus I.

When it was made a terminus of the first German long-distance railway to Dresden (the capital of Saxony) in 1839, Leipzig became a hub of Central European railway traffic, with Leipzig Hauptbahnhof the largest terminal station by area in Europe. The railway station has two grand entrance halls, the eastern one for the Royal Saxon State Railways and the western one for the Prussian state railways.

In the 19th century, Leipzig was a centre of the German and Saxon liberal movements. The first German labor party, the General German Workers' Association (Allgemeiner Deutscher Arbeiterverein, ADAV) was founded in Leipzig on 23 May 1863 by Ferdinand Lassalle; about 600 workers from across Germany travelled to the foundation on the new railway. Leipzig expanded rapidly to more than 700,000 inhabitants. Huge Gründerzeit areas were built, which mostly survived both war and post-war demolition.

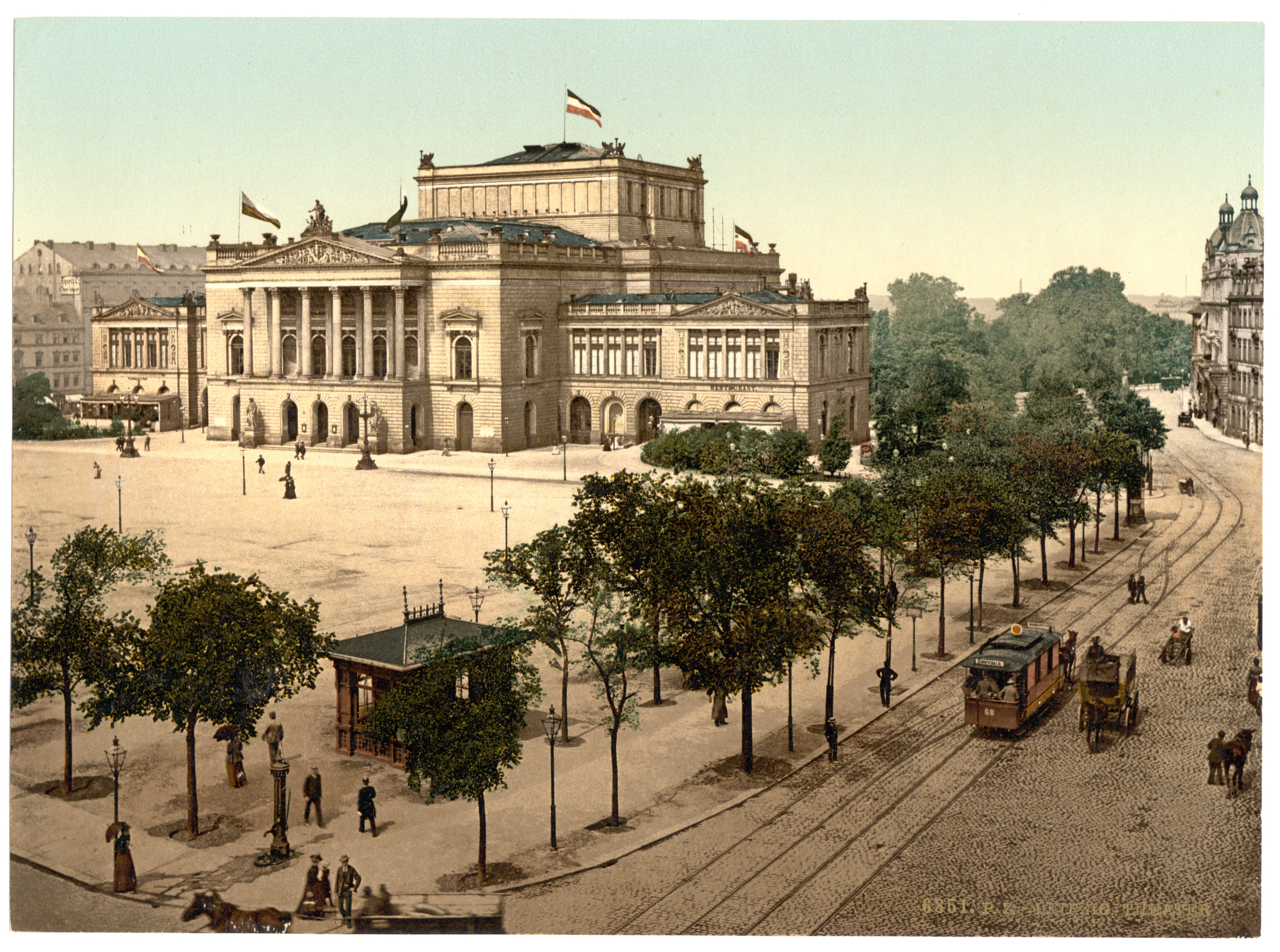
Augustusplatz with Leipzig Opera House, c. 1900

=== 20th century ===
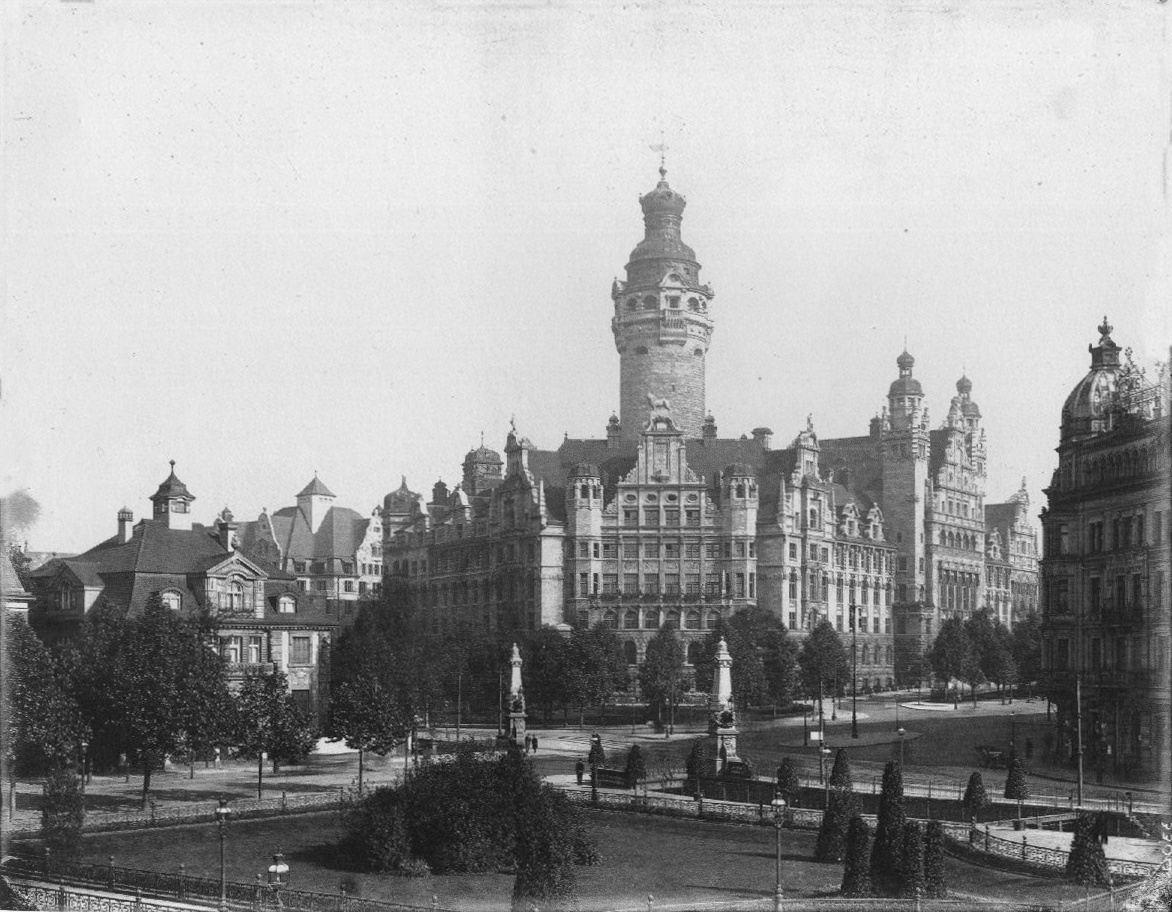
New Town Hall of Leipzig, built in 1905

With the opening of a fifth production hall in 1907, the Leipziger Baumwollspinnerei became the largest cotton mill company on the continent, housing over 240,000 spindles. Yearly production surpassed 5 million kilograms of yarn.

During World War I, in 1917, the American Consulate was closed, and its building became a temporary place of stay for Americans and Allied refugees from Serbia, Romania, and Japan.

During the 1930s and 1940s, music was prominent throughout Leipzig. Many students attended Felix Mendelssohn Bartholdy College of Music and Theatre (then named Landeskonservatorium.) However, in 1944, it was closed due to World War II. It re-opened soon after the war ended in 1945.

On 22 May 1930, Carl Friedrich Goerdeler was elected mayor of Leipzig. He later became an opponent of the Nazi regime. He resigned in 1937 when, in his absence, his Nazi deputy ordered the destruction of the city's statue of Felix Mendelssohn. On Kristallnacht in 1938, the 1855 Moorish Revival Leipzig synagogue, one of the city's most architecturally significant buildings, was deliberately destroyed. Goerdeler was later executed by the Nazis on 2 February 1945.

Several thousand forced labourers were stationed in Leipzig during the Second World War.

Beginning in 1933, many Jewish citizens of Leipzig were members of the Gemeinde, a large Jewish religious community spread throughout Germany, Austria, and Switzerland. In October 1935, the Gemeinde helped found the Lehrhaus (English: a house of study) in Leipzig to provide different forms of studies to Jewish students who were prohibited from attending any institutions in Germany. Jewish studies were emphasized and much of the Jewish community of Leipzig became involved.

Like all other cities claimed by the Nazis, Leipzig was subject to aryanisation. Beginning in 1933 and increasing in 1939, Jewish business owners were forced to give up their possessions and stores. This eventually intensified to the point where Nazi officials were strong enough to evict the Jews from their own homes. They also had the power to force many of the Jews living in the city to sell their houses. Many people who sold their homes emigrated elsewhere, outside of Leipzig. Others moved to Judenhäuser, which were smaller houses that acted as ghettos, housing large groups of people.

The Jews of Leipzig were greatly affected by the Nuremberg Laws. However, due to the Leipzig Trade Fair and the international attention it garnered, Leipzig was especially cautious about its public image. Despite this, the Leipzig authorities were not afraid to strictly apply and enforce anti-semitic measures.

On 20 December 1937, after the Nazis took control of the city, they renamed it Reichsmessestadt Leipzig, meaning the "Imperial Trade Fair City Leipzig". In early 1938, Leipzig saw an increase in Zionism through Jewish citizens. Many of these Zionists attempted to flee before deportations began. On 28 October 1938, Heinrich Himmler ordered the deportation of Polish Jews from Leipzig to Poland. The Polish Consulate sheltered 1,300 Polish Jews, preventing their deportation.

On 9 November 1938, as part of Kristallnacht, in Gottschedstrasse, synagogues and businesses were set on fire. Only a couple of days later, on 11 November 1938, many Jews in the Leipzig area were deported to the Buchenwald Concentration Camp. As World War II came to an end, much of Leipzig was destroyed. Following the war, the Communist Party of Germany provided aid for the reconstruction of the city.

In 1933, a census recorded that over 11,000 Jews were living in Leipzig. In the 1939 census, the number had fallen to roughly 4,500, and by January 1942 only 2,000 remained. In that month, these 2,000 Jews began to be deported. On 13 July 1942, 170 Jews were deported from Leipzig to Auschwitz concentration camp. On 19 September 1942, 440 Jews were deported from Leipzig to Theresienstadt concentration camp. On 18 June 1943, the remaining 18 Jews still in Leipzig were deported from Leipzig to Auschwitz. According to records of the two waves of deportations to Auschwitz there were no survivors. According to records of the Theresienstadt deportation, only 53 Jews survived.

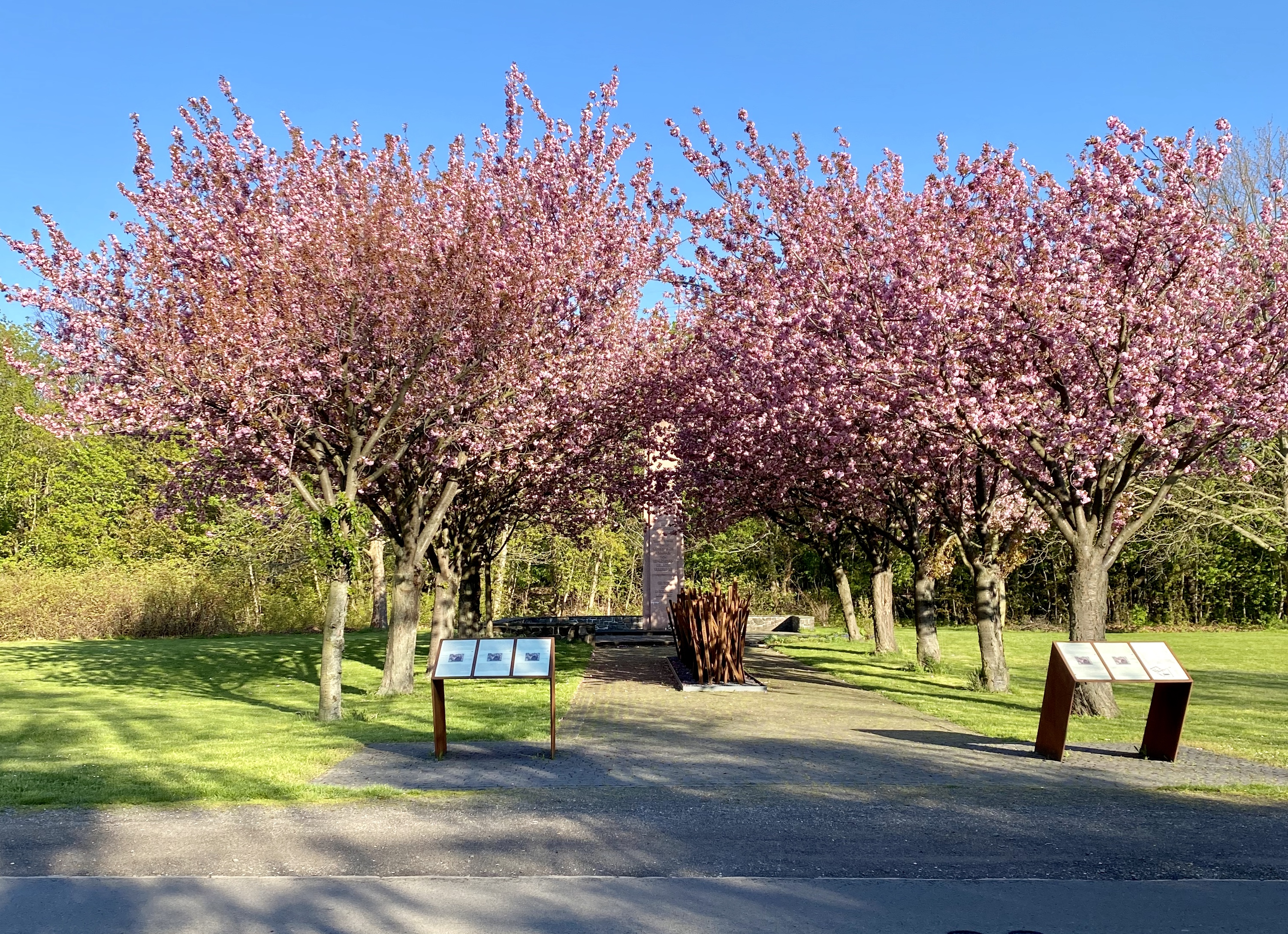
Memorial at the site of the Abtnaundorf massacre

During the German invasion of Poland at the start of World War II, in September 1939, the Gestapo carried out arrests of prominent local Poles, and seized the Polish Consulate and its library. In 1941, the American Consulate was also closed by order of the German authorities. During the war, Leipzig was the location of five subcamps of the Buchenwald concentration camp, in which over 8,000 men, women, and children were imprisoned, mostly Polish, Jewish, Soviet, and French, but also Italian, Czech, and Belgian. In April 1945, most surviving prisoners were sent on death marches to various destinations in Saxony and German-occupied Czechoslovakia, whereas prisoners of the Leipzig-Thekla subcamp who were unable to march were either burned alive, shot, or beaten to death by the Gestapo, SS, Volkssturm, and German civilians in the Abtnaundorf massacre. Some were rescued by Polish forced laborers of another camp; at least 67 people survived. 84 victims were buried on 27 April 1945, however, the total number of victims remains unknown.

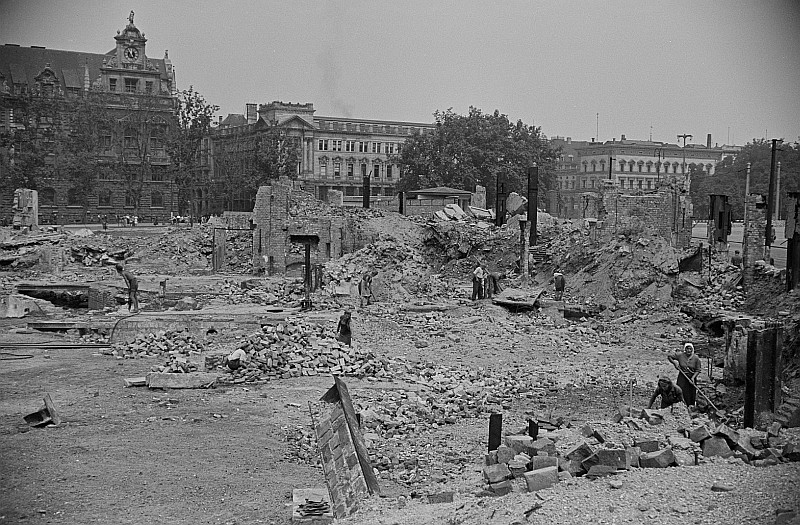
Leipzig after bombing in the Second World War

During World War II, Leipzig was repeatedly struck by Allied bombing raids, beginning in 1943 and lasting until 1945. The first raid occurred on the morning of 4 December 1943, when 442 bombers of the Royal Air Force (RAF) dropped a total amount of almost 1,400 tons of explosives and incendiaries on the city, destroying large parts of the city centre. This bombing was the largest up to that time. Due to the close proximity of many of the buildings hit, a firestorm occurred. This prompted firefighters to rush to the city; however, they were unable to control the fires. Unlike the firebombing of the neighbouring city of Dresden, this was a largely conventional bombing with high explosives rather than incendiaries. The resultant pattern of loss was a patchwork, rather than wholesale loss of its centre, but was nevertheless extensive.

The Allied ground advance into Germany reached Leipzig in late April 1945. The U.S. 2nd Infantry Division and U.S. 69th Infantry Division fought their way into the city on 18 April and completed its capture after fierce urban action, in which fighting was often house-to-house and block-to-block, on 19 April 1945. In April 1945, the Mayor of Leipzig, SS-Gruppenführer Alfred Freyberg, his wife and daughter, together with Deputy Mayor and City Treasurer Ernest Kurt Lisso, his wife, daughter, and Volkssturm Major and former Mayor Walter Dönicke, all committed suicide in Leipzig City Hall.

The United States turned the city over to the Red Army as it pulled back from the line of contact with Soviet forces in July 1945 to the designated occupation zone boundaries. Leipzig became one of the major cities of the German Democratic Republic (East Germany).

Following the end of World War II in 1945, Leipzig saw a slow return of Jews to the city. They were joined by large numbers of German refugees who had been expelled from Central and Eastern Europe.

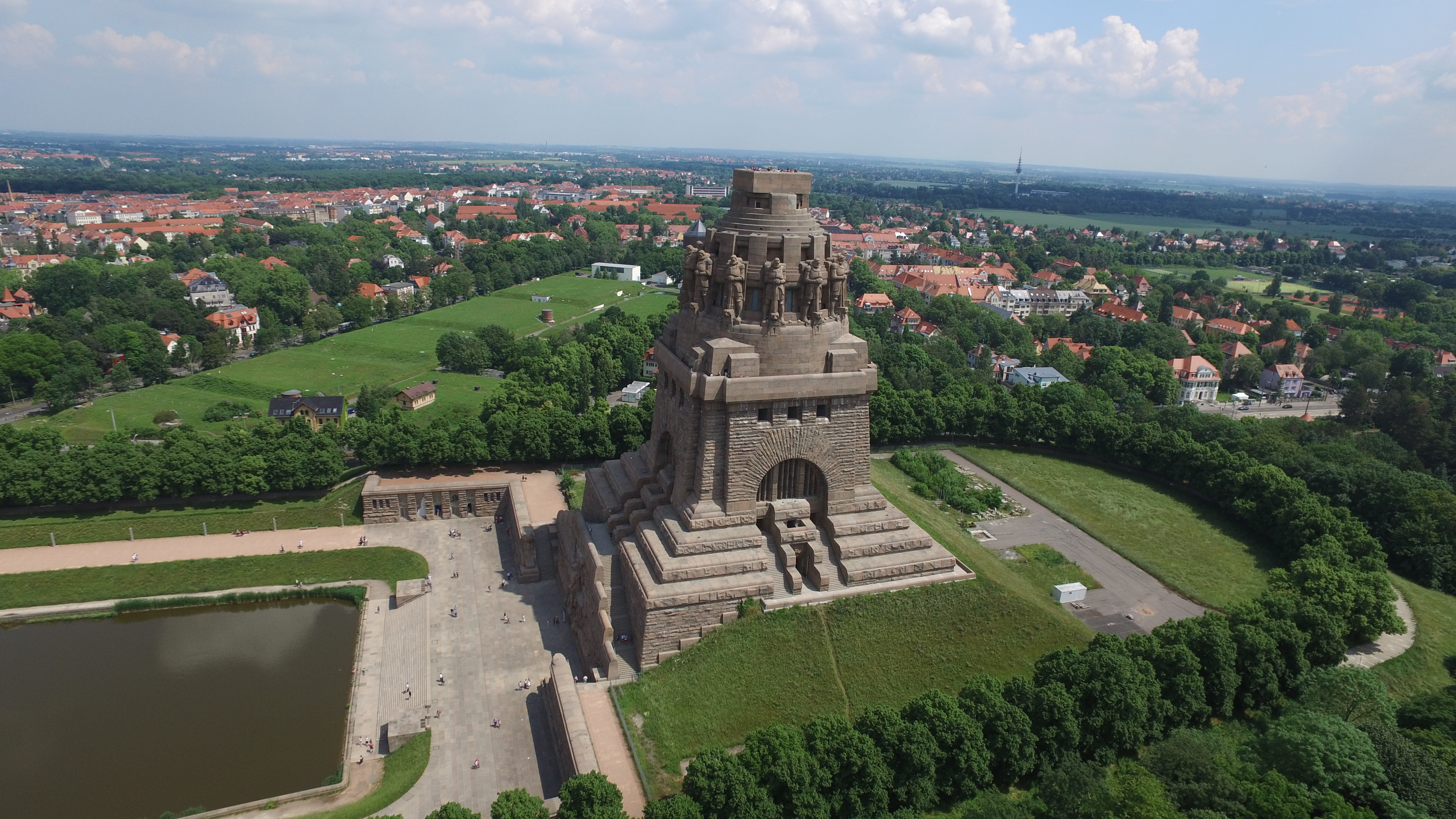
Monument to the Battle of the Nations

In the mid-20th century, the city's trade fair assumed renewed importance as a point of contact with the Comecon Eastern Europe economic bloc, of which East Germany was a member. At this time, trade fairs were held at a site in the south of the city, near the Monument to the Battle of the Nations.

The planned economy of the German Democratic Republic, however, was not kind to Leipzig. Before the Second World War, Leipzig had developed a mixture of industry, creative business (notably publishing), and services (including legal services). During the period of the German Democratic Republic, services became the concern of the state, concentrated in East Berlin; capitalist business moved to West Germany; and Leipzig was left only with heavy industry. To make matters worse, this industry was extremely polluting, making Leipzig an even less attractive city to live in. Between 1950 and the end of the German Democratic Republic, the population of Leipzig fell from 600,000 to 500,000.

In October 1989, after prayers for peace at St. Nicholas Church, established in 1983 as part of the peace movement, the Monday demonstrations started as the most prominent mass protest against the East German government. The reunification of Germany, however, was at first not good for Leipzig. The centrally planned heavy industry that had become the city's specialty was, in terms of the advanced economy of reunited Germany, almost completely unviable, and closed. Within only six years, 90% of jobs in industry had vanished. As unemployment rocketed, the population fell dramatically; some 100,000 people left Leipzig in the ten years after reunification, and vacant and derelict housing became an urgent problem.

Starting in 2000, an ambitious urban-renewal plan first stopped Leipzig's population decline and then reversed it. The plan focused on saving and improving the city's attractive historic downtown area and particularly its early 20th-century building stock, and attracting new industries, partly through infrastructure improvement. However, the renewal has led to gentrification of parts of the city and has not arrested the decline of Leipzig-East.

=== 21st century ===
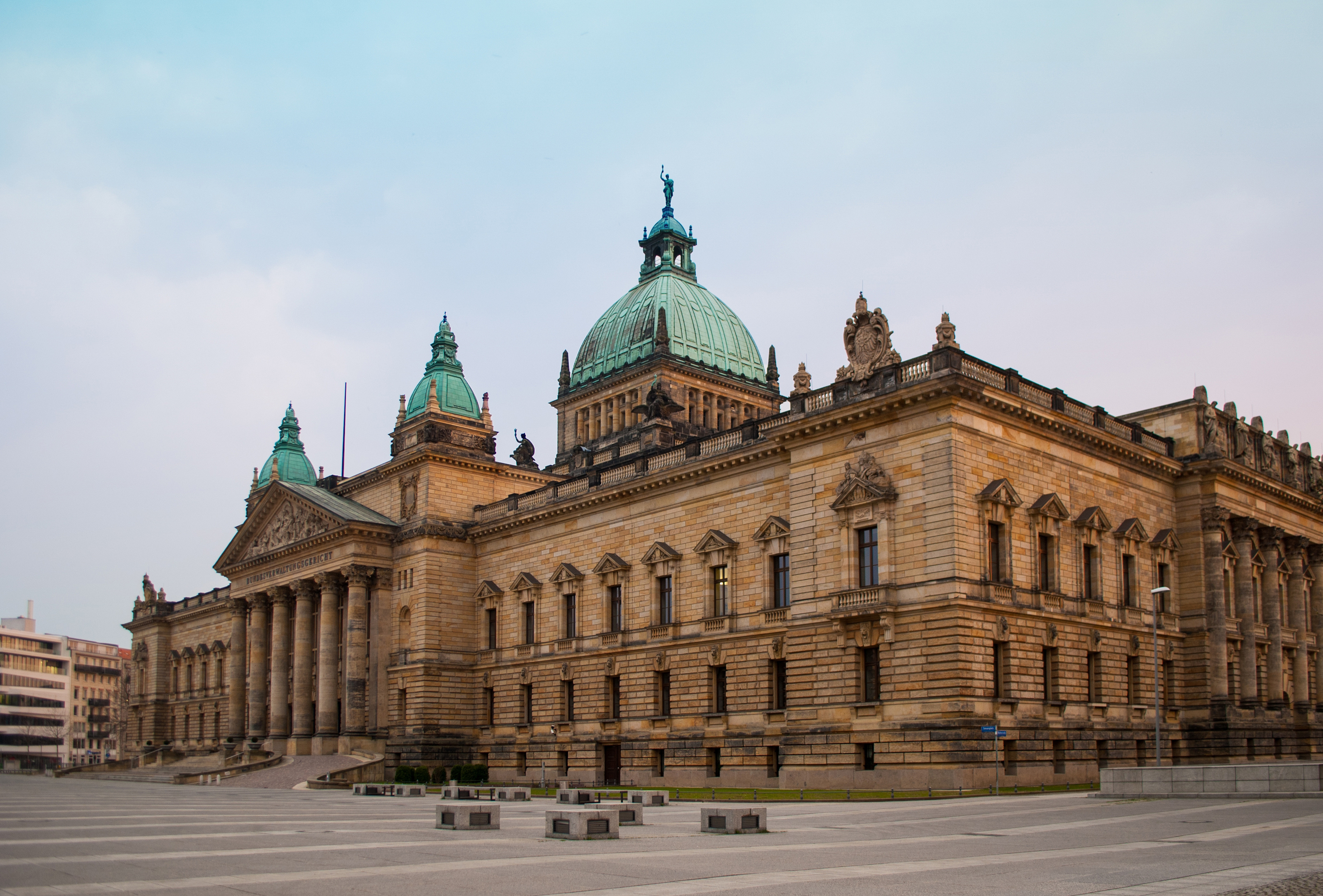
Federal Administrative Court of Germany in the Reich Court building

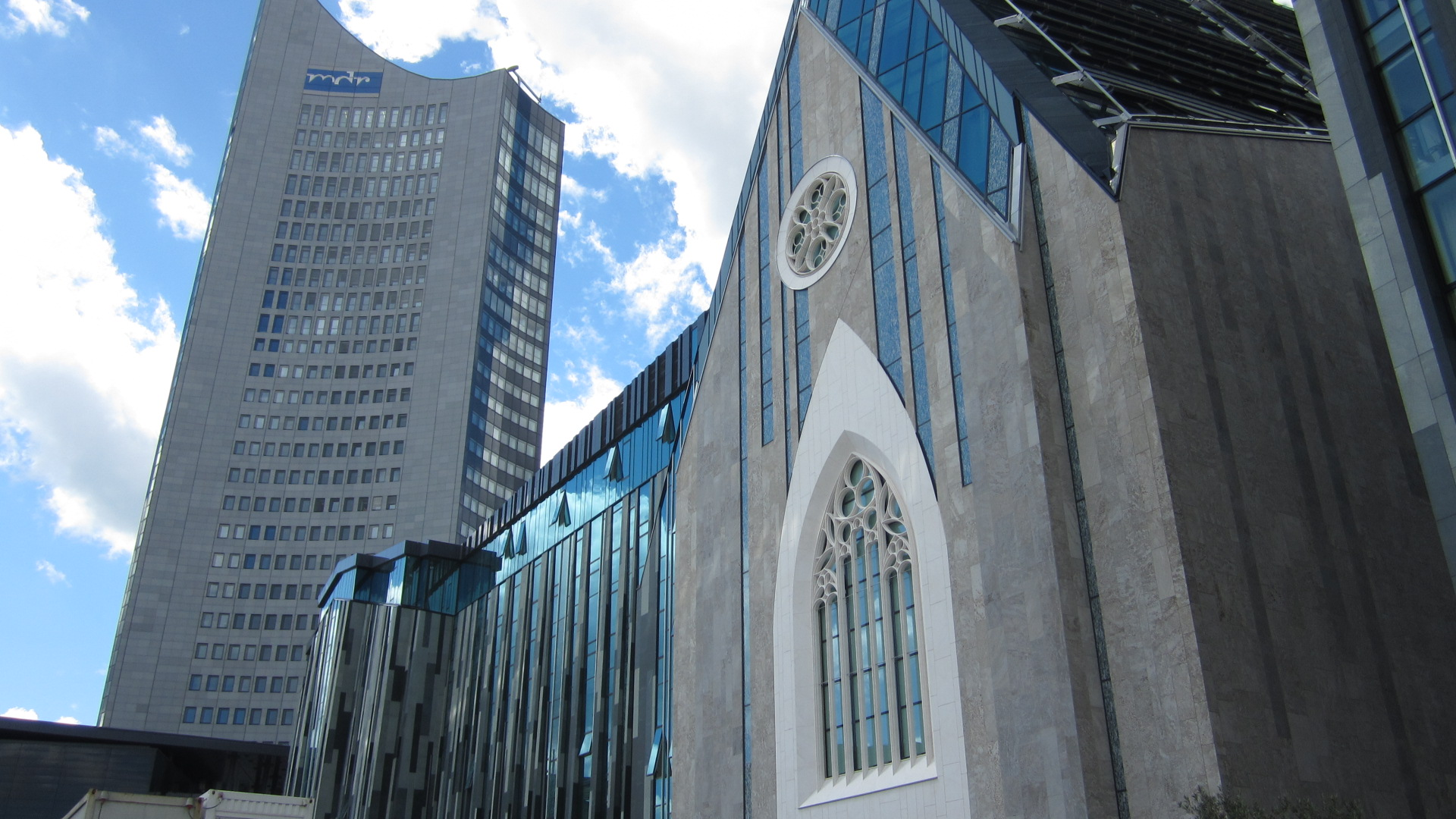
The 153 m (502 ft) tall City-Hochhaus Leipzig and the Augusteum of the University of Leipzig

Leipzig is an important economic centre in Germany. Since the 2010s, the city has been celebrated by the media as a hip urban centre with a very high quality of living. It is often called "The new Berlin". Leipzig is also Germany's fastest growing city. Leipzig was the German candidate for the 2012 Summer Olympics, but was unsuccessful. After ten years of construction, the Leipzig City Tunnel opened on 14 December 2013. Leipzig forms the centrepiece of the S-Bahn Mitteldeutschland public transit system, which operates in the four German states of Saxony, Saxony-Anhalt, Thuringia, and Brandenburg.

== Politics ==
=== Mayor ===
Results of the second round of the 2020 mayoral election

The first freely elected mayor after German reunification was Hinrich Lehmann-Grube of the Social Democratic Party (SPD), who served from 1990 to 1998. The mayor was originally chosen by the city council, but since 1994 has been directly elected. Wolfgang Tiefensee, also of the SDP, served from 1998 until his resignation in 2005 to become federal Minister of Transport. He was succeeded by fellow SPD politician Burkhard Jung, who was elected in January 2006 and re-elected in 2013 and 2020. The most recent mayoral election was held on 2 February 2020, with a runoff held on 1 March, and the results were as follows:

| Candidate | Party | First round | | Second round | |
| Candidate | Party | Votes | % | Votes | % |
|---|---|---|---|---|---|
| Sebastian Gemkow | Christian Democratic Union | 72,427 | 31.6 | 107,611 | 47.6 |
| Burkhard Jung | Social Democratic Party | 68,286 | 29.8 | 110,965 | 49.1 |
| Franziska Riekewald | The Left | 31,036 | 13.5 | | |
| Katharina Krefft | Alliance 90/The Greens | 27,481 | 12.0 | | |
| Christoph Neumann | Alternative for Germany | 19,854 | 8.7 | | |
| Katharina Subat | Die PARTEI | 5,467 | 2.4 | | |
| Marcus Viefeld | Free Democratic Party | 2,739 | 1.2 | | |
| Ute Elisabeth Gabelmann | Pirate Party Germany | 2,089 | 0.9 | 7,542 | 3.3 |
| Valid votes | | 229,379 | 99.6 | 226,118 | 99.5 |
| Invalid votes | | 822 | 0.4 | 1,235 | 0.5 |
| Total | | 230,201 | 100.0 | 227,353 | 100.0 |
| Electorate/voter turnout | | 469,225 | 49.1 | 469,269 | 48.4 |
Source: Wahlen in Sachsen Archived 12 May 2021 at the Wayback Machine

=== City council ===
Strongest party by locality in the 2024 City Council election

The most recent city council election was held on 9 June 2024, and the results were as follows:

| Party | Votes | % | +/- | Seats | +/- |
|---|---|---|---|---|---|
| Christian Democratic Union (CDU) | 173,343 | 18.9 | ▲1.4 | 13 | 0 |
| The Left (Die Linke) | 160,490 | 17.5 | ▼3.9 | 12 | ▼3 |
| Alternative for Germany (AfD) | 155,506 | 17.0 | ▲2.1 | 12 | ▲1 |
| Alliance 90/The Greens (Grüne) | 137,614 | 15.0 | ▼5.7 | 11 | ▼4 |
| Social Democratic Party (SPD) | 110,520 | 12.1 | ▼0.3 | 8 | ▼1 |
| Sahra Wagenknecht Alliance (BSW) | 88,146 | 9.6 | New | 7 | New |
| Die PARTEI (PARTEI) | 31,933 | 3.5 | ▼0.3 | 2 | 0 |
| Free Democratic Party (FDP) | 24,898 | 2.7 | ▼2.1 | 2 | ▼1 |
| Free Voters Leipzig (FW) | 10,106 | 1.1 | ▼1.4 | 1 | 0 |
| Pirate Party Germany (Piraten) | 9,759 | 1.1 | ▼0.3 | 1 | 0 |
| Free Saxons (FS) | 8,965 | 1.0 | New | 1 | New |
| Volt Germany (Volt) | 2,391 | 0.3 | New | 0 | New |
| dieBasis | 914 | 0.1 | New | 0 | New |
| Garden 24 | 829 | 0.1 | New | 0 | New |
| Our Human Rights in Focus | 223 | 0.0 | New | 0 | New |
| Valid votes | 915,637 | 100.0 | | | |
| Total | 318,541 | 100.0 | | 70 | ±0 |
| Electorate/voter turnout | 472,669 | 67.4 | ▲7.7 | | |
Source: Wahlen Leipzig

=== State Landtag ===
In the Landtag of Saxony, Leipzig is divided among eight constituencies. After the 2024 Saxony state election, the composition and representation of each was as follows:

| Constituency | Area | Party | Member |
|---|---|---|---|
| 25 Leipzig 1 | City centre | Left | Nam Duy Nguyen |
| 26 Leipzig 2 | Southeast | CDU | Ronald Pohle |
| 27 Leipzig 3 | Inner north (Gohlis) | CDU | Wolf-Dietrich Rost |
| 28 Leipzig 4 | Central south | Left | Juliane Nagel |
| 29 Leipzig 5 | Southwest | CDU | Andreas Nowak |
| 30 Leipzig 6 | Inner west (Lindenau) | Grüne | Claudia Maicher |
| 31 Leipzig 7 | Northwest | CDU | Rick Ulbricht |
| 32 Leipzig 8 | Northeast/inner east | CDU | Holger Gasse |

=== Bundestag ===
In the Bundestag, Leipzig constitutes two constituencies. In the 20th Bundestag, the composition and representation of each was as follows:

| Constituency | Area | Party | Member |
|---|---|---|---|
| 151 Leipzig I | Alt-West, Nord, Nordost, Nordwest, and Ost | CDU | Jens Lehmann |
| 152 Leipzig II | Mitte, Süd, Südost, Südwest, and West | Left | Sören Pellmann |

== Demographics ==
Population development since 1200

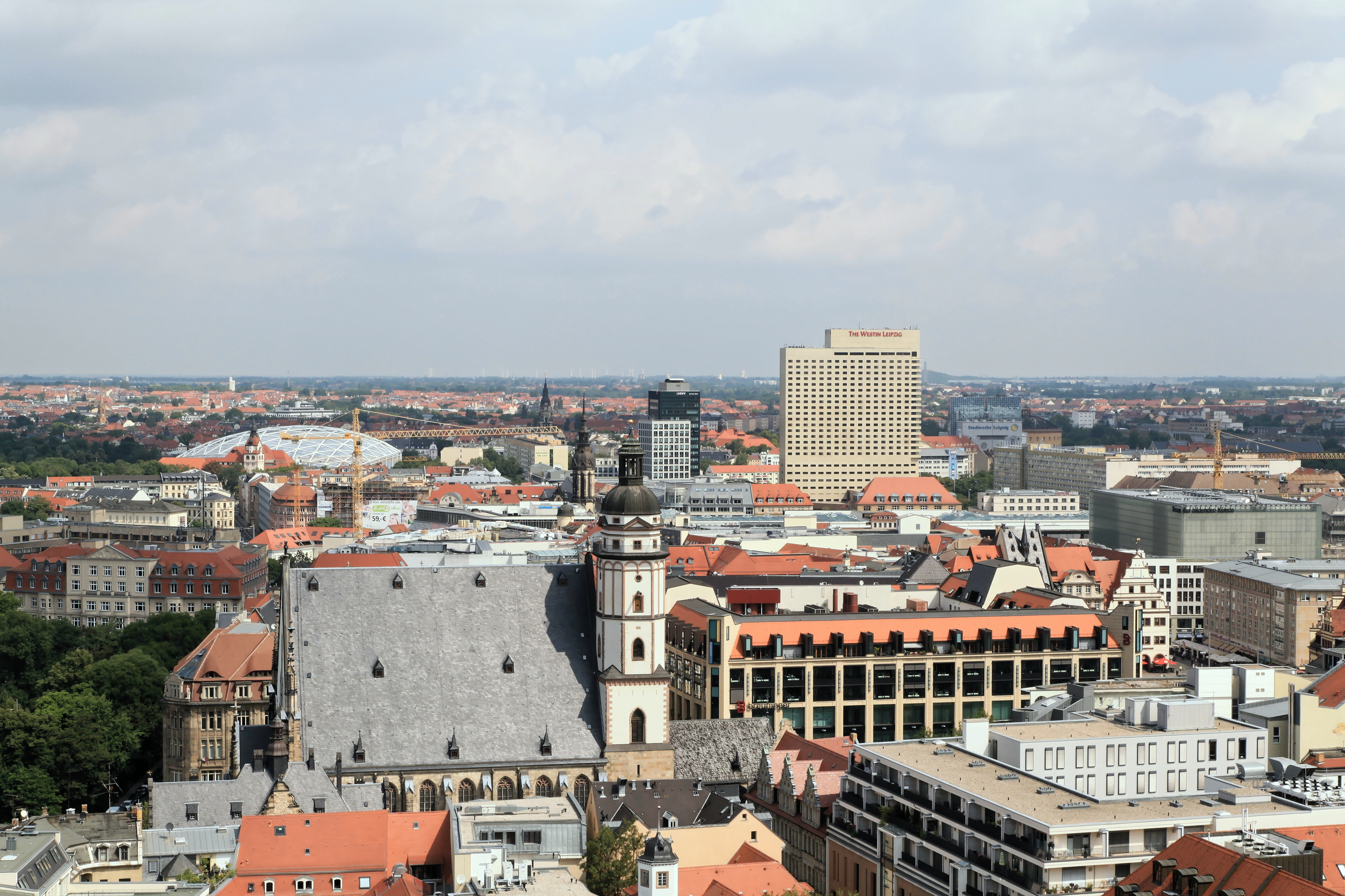
Typically dense cityscape of Leipzig old town, view from the new town hall. Buildings from left to right: Gondwanaland of Leipzig Zoo; St. Thomas Church; headquarters of Sparkasse Leipzig Bank; the Westin Hotel; and Museum of Fine Arts to the right.

Historical population
| Year | Pop. | ±% |
|---|---|---|
| 1507 | 9,000 | — |
| 1600 | 20,000 | +122.2% |
| 1750 | 35,000 | +75.0% |
| 1852 | 66,686 | +90.5% |
| 1875 | 127,387 | +91.0% |
| 1890 | 295,025 | +131.6% |
| 1900 | 456,124 | +54.6% |
| 1910 | 589,850 | +29.3% |
| 1920 | 620,000 | +5.1% |
| 1930 | 718,200 | +15.8% |
| 1935 | 699,300 | −2.6% |
| 1940 | 709,100 | +1.4% |
| 1945 | 581,528 | −18.0% |
| 1955 | 613,707 | +5.5% |
| 1960 | 589,632 | −3.9% |
| 1965 | 595,660 | +1.0% |
| 1970 | 583,885 | −2.0% |
| 1980 | 562,480 | −3.7% |
| 1990 | 511,079 | −9.1% |
| 1995 | 470,778 | −7.9% |
| 2001 | 493,052 | +4.7% |
| 2011 | 502,979 | +2.0% |
| 2022 | 598,899 | +19.1% |
Population size may be affected by changes in administrative divisions. Source for 2001–2022:

Leipzig has a population of about 620,000. In 1930, the population reached its historical peak of over 700,000. It decreased steadily from 1950 to about 530,000 in 1989. In the 1990s, the population decreased rather rapidly to 437,000 in 1998. This reduction was mostly due to outward migration and suburbanisation. After almost doubling the city area by incorporation of surrounding towns in 1999, the number stabilised and started to rise again, with an increase of 1,000 in 2000. As of 2015, Leipzig is the fastest-growing city in Germany with over 500,000 inhabitants. The growth of the past 10–15 years has mostly been due to inward migration. In recent years, inward migration accelerated, reaching an increase of 12,917 in 2014.

In the years following German reunification, many people of working age took the opportunity to move to the states of the former West Germany to seek employment opportunities. This was a contributory factor to falling birth rates. Births dropped from 7,000 in 1988 to less than 3,000 in 1994. However, the number of children born in Leipzig has risen since the late 1990s. In 2011, it reached 5,490 births resulting in a RNI of −17.7 (−393.7 in 1995).

The unemployment rate decreased from 18.2% in 2003 to 9.8% in 2014 and 7.6% in June 2017.

The percentage of the population from an immigrant background is low compared with other German cities. As of 2012, only 5.6% of the population were foreigners, compared to the German national average of 7.7%.

The number of people with an immigrant background (immigrants and their children) grew from 49,323 in 2012 to 77,559 in 2016, making them 13.3% of the city's population (Leipzig's population 579,530 in 2016).

The largest minorities (first and second generation) in Leipzig by country of origin as of 31 December 2021 are:

| Rank | Country | Total | Foreigners | Germans |
|---|---|---|---|---|
| 1 | Ukraine | 11,768 | 10,022 | 1,746 |
| 2 | Syria | 9,059 | 8,523 | 536 |
| 3 | Russia | 8,773 | 3,214 | 5,559 |
| 4 | Poland | 5,019 | 3,006 | 2,013 |
| 5 | Romania | 4,161 | 3,675 | 486 |
| 6 | Vietnam | 3,930 | 2,403 | 1,527 |
| 7 | Turkey | 2,820 | 1,800 | 1,020 |
| 8 | Iraq | 2,816 | 2,104 | 712 |
| 9 | Kazakhstan | 2,244 | 246 | 1,998 |
| 10 | Afghanistan | 2,171 | 1,916 | 255 |
| 11 | Italy | 1,983 | 1,564 | 419 |
| 12 | Hungary | 1,814 | 1,349 | 465 |
| 13 | Bulgaria | 1,615 | 1,238 | 377 |
| 14 | France | 1,594 | 1,066 | 528 |
| 15 | India | 1,537 | 1,309 | 232 |

== Culture, sights, and cityscape ==
In the 2010s, Leipzig was often referred to as Hypezig, as overblown comparisons were made to 1990s and early 2000s Berlin. The affordability, diversity, and openness of the city have attracted many young people from across Europe, leading to a trendsetting alternative atmosphere, resulting in an innovative music, dance, and art scene.

=== Architecture ===
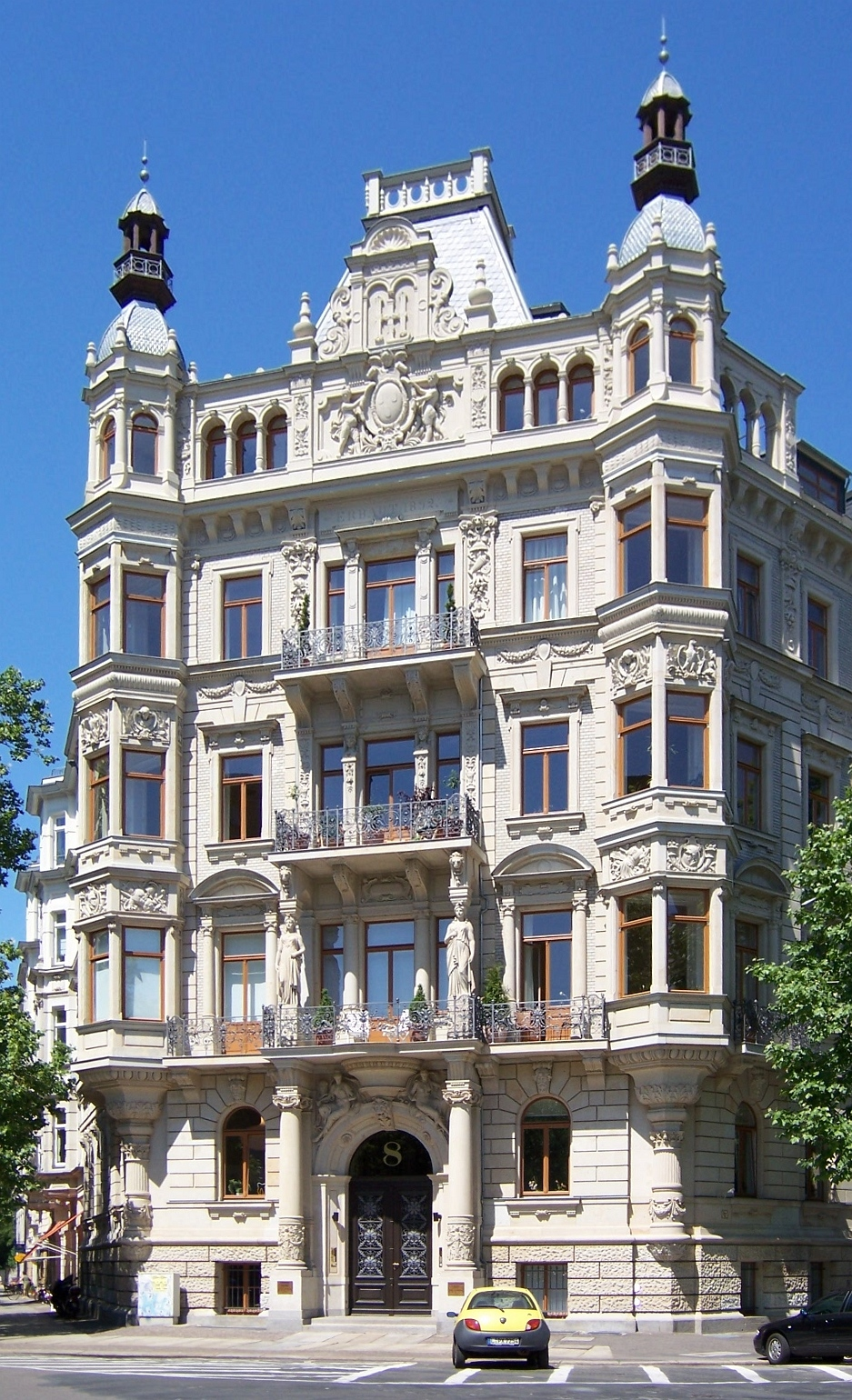
Palais Roßbach, one of the many Gründerzeit buildings in Leipzig

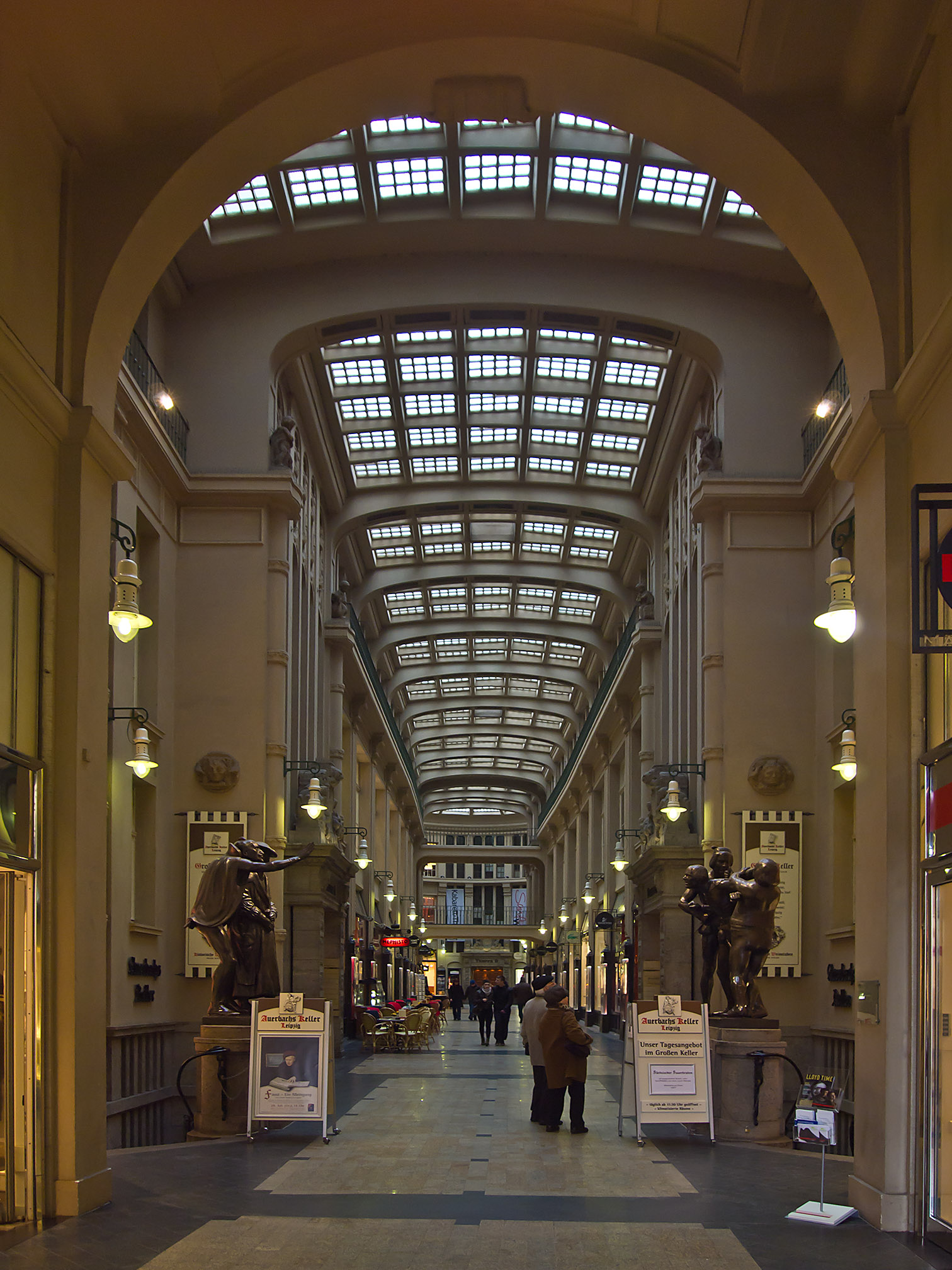
Mädler Passage, one of 24 covered passages in Leipzig city centre

The historic central area of Leipzig features a Renaissance-style ensemble of buildings from the sixteenth century, including the old city hall in the marketplace. There are also several baroque period trading houses and former residences of rich merchants. As Leipzig grew considerably during the economic boom of the late-nineteenth century, the town has many buildings in the historicist style representative of the Gründerzeit era. Approximately 35% of Leipzig's flats are in buildings of this type. The new city hall, completed in 1905, is built in the same style.

Some 90,000 apartments in Leipzig were built in Plattenbau buildings during Communist rule in East Germany. Although some of these have been demolished and fewer people live in this type of accommodation in recent years, a significant number still live in Plattenbau apartments. Grünau, for example, had about 43,600 people living in this sort of accommodation in 2016.

The St. Paul's Church was destroyed by the Communist government in 1968 to make room for a new main building for the university. After some debate, the city decided to establish a new, mainly secular building at the same location, called Paulinum, which was completed in 2012. Its architecture alludes to the look of the former church and it includes space for religious use by the faculty of theology, including the original altar from the old church and two newly built organs.

Many commercial buildings were built in the 1990s as a result of tax breaks after German reunification.

=== Tallest buildings and structures ===
The tallest structure in Leipzig is the chimney of the Stahl- und Hartgusswerk Bösdorf GmbH with a height of 205 m (673 ft). With 142 m (466 ft), the tallest building in Leipzig is the City-Hochhaus Leipzig. From 1972 to 1973 it was Germany's tallest building.

| Buildings and structures | Image | Height in metres | Year | Notes |
|---|---|---|---|---|
| Chimney of Stahl- und Hartgusswerk Bösdorf GmbH | | 205 | 1984 | |
| Funkturm Leipzig | | 191 | 2015 | |
| DVB-T-Sendeturm | | 190 | 1986 | Demolished in 2023 after loss of function. |
| 4 x Wind turbine Nordex N100 | | 190 | 2013 | |
| City-Hochhaus Leipzig | | 142 | 1972 | Total height 155 m, headquarters of European Energy Exchange. |
| Fernmeldeturm Leipzig | | 132 | 1995 | |
| Tower of New Town Hall | | 115 | 1905 | Tallest town hall in Germany |
| Wintergartenhochhaus | | 106.8 | 1972 | Used as residential tower |
| The Westin Leipzig | | 96 | 1981 | Hotel with skybar and restaurant |
| Monument to the Battle of the Nations | | 91 | 1913 | Tallest monument in Europe. |
| St. Peters' | | 88.5 | 1885 | Leipzig's tallest church. |
| MDR-Hochhaus | | 65 | 2000 | MDR is one of Germany's public broadcasters. |
| Hochhaus Löhr's Carree | | 65 | 1997 | Headquarters of Sachsen Bank and Sparkasse Leipzig. |
| Center Torgauer Platz | | 63 | 1995 | |
| Europahaus | | 56 | 1929 | Headquarters of Stadtwerke Leipzig |

=== Museums and the arts ===
One of the highlights of the city's contemporary arts was the Neo Rauch retrospective opening in April 2010 at the Leipzig Museum of Fine Arts. This is a show devoted to the father of the New Leipzig School of artists. According to The New York Times, this scene "has been the toast of the contemporary art world" for the past decade. In addition, there are eleven galleries in the so-called Spinnerei.

The Grassi Museum complex contains three more of Leipzig's major collections: the Ethnography Museum, Applied Arts Museum, and Musical Instrument Museum (the last of which is run by the University of Leipzig). The university also runs the Museum of Antiquities.

Founded in March 2015, the G2 Kunsthalle houses the Hildebrand Collection. This private collection focuses on the so-called New Leipzig School. Leipzig's first private museum dedicated to contemporary art in Leipzig after the turn of the millennium is located in the city centre close to the famous St. Thomas Church on the third floor of the former GDR processing centre. Also dedicated to the contemporary art is the Galerie für Zeitgenössische Kunst Leipzig.

Other museums in Leipzig include the following:

- The German Museum of Books and Writing is the world's oldest museum of its kind, founded in 1884.
- The Bach Museum at the St. Thomas Church Square.
- The Egyptian Museum of the University of Leipzig located in the Kroch High-rise comprises a collection of about 7,000 artefacts from several millennia.
- The Schillerhaus is the house where Schiller lived in summer 1785.
- The Zeitgeschichtliches Forum Leipzig (Forum of Contemporary History) shows the history of the German division and the everyday life in the socialist German Democratic Republic.
- Naturkundemuseum Leipzig is the city's natural history museum.
- The Leipzig Panometer is a visual panorama displayed inside a former gasometer, accompanied by a thematic exhibition.
- The "Museum in der Runden Ecke" is the best-known museum in the city. It deals with the operation of the Stasi State Security of the former East Germany.
- Johann Sebastian Bach lived from 1723 until his death in Leipzig. The Bach Archive is an institution for the documentation and research of his life and work.
- Mendelssohn House, home of Felix Mendelssohn from 1845 until his death in 1847.
- Schumann House, home of Robert and Clara Schumann from 1840 to 1844.
- The Museum of Antiquities of Leipzig University and a small museum regarding he youth of Richard Wagner in the Old St Nicholas School.
- The Saxon Psychiatric Museum is a small museum dealing with the history of lunatic asylums and psychiatry.
- The Unikatum Children's Museum, Leipzig opened in 2010 in Plagwitz.
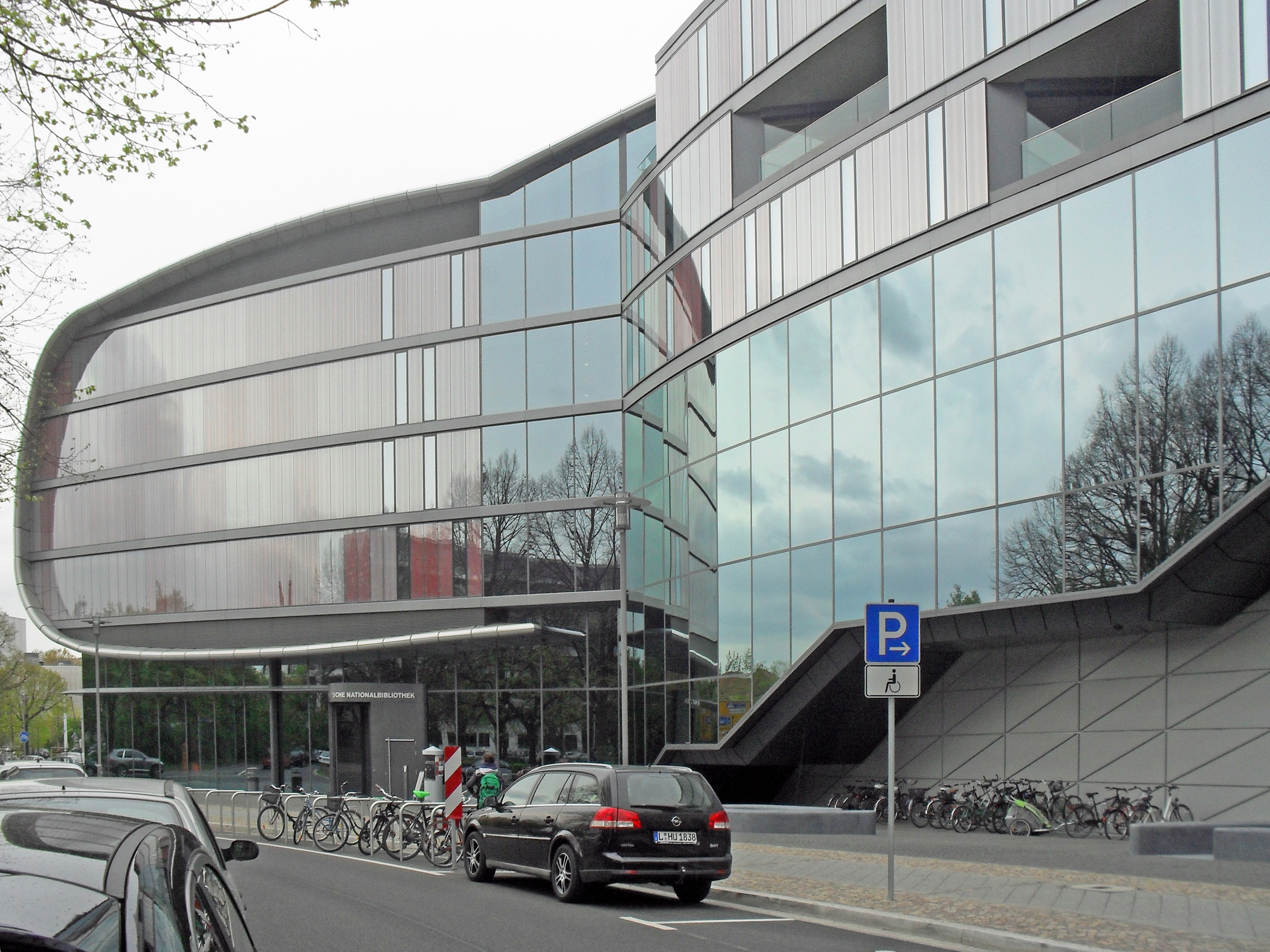
German Museum of Books and Writing

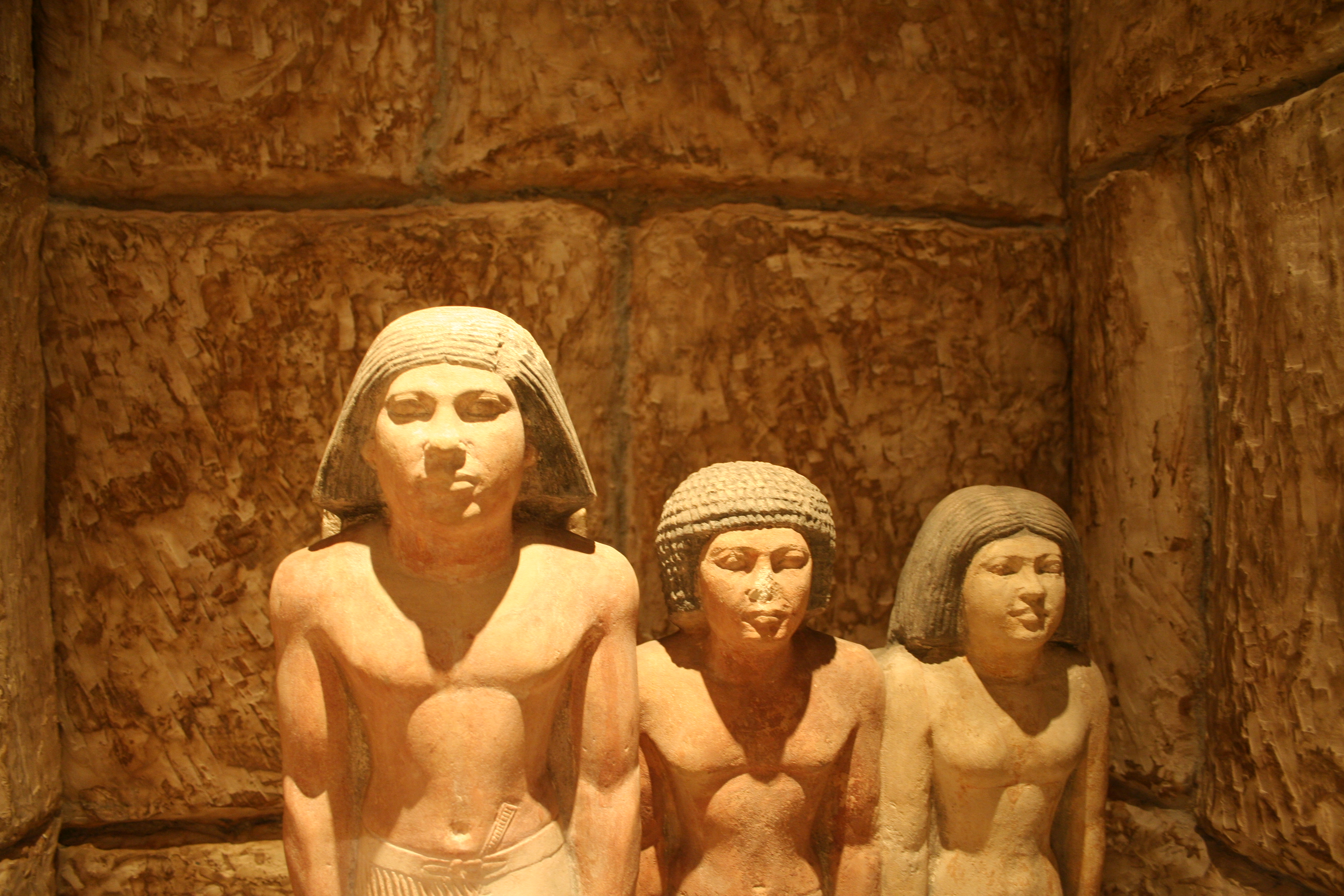
Exhibits of the Egyptian Museum

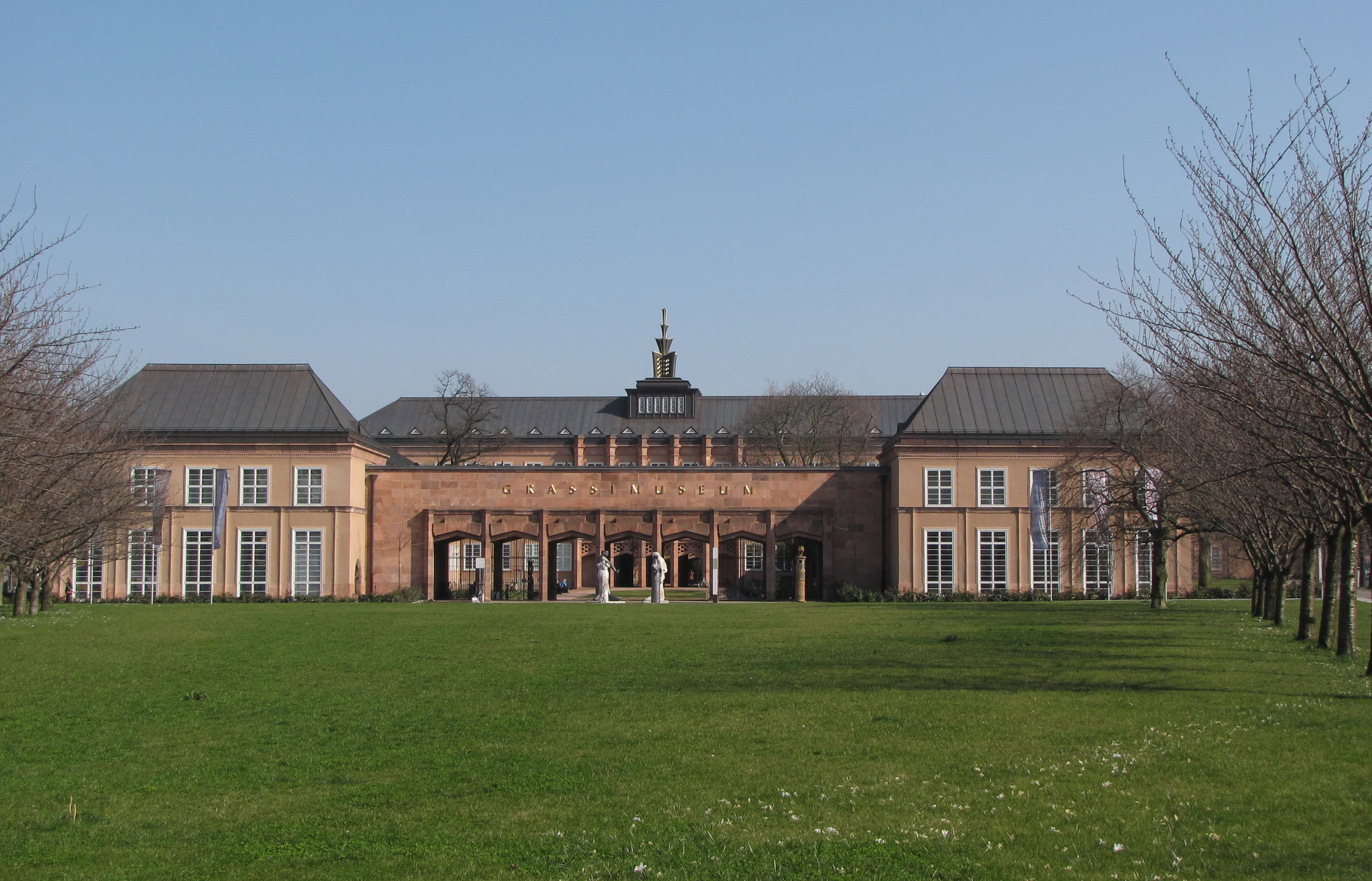
Grassi Museum

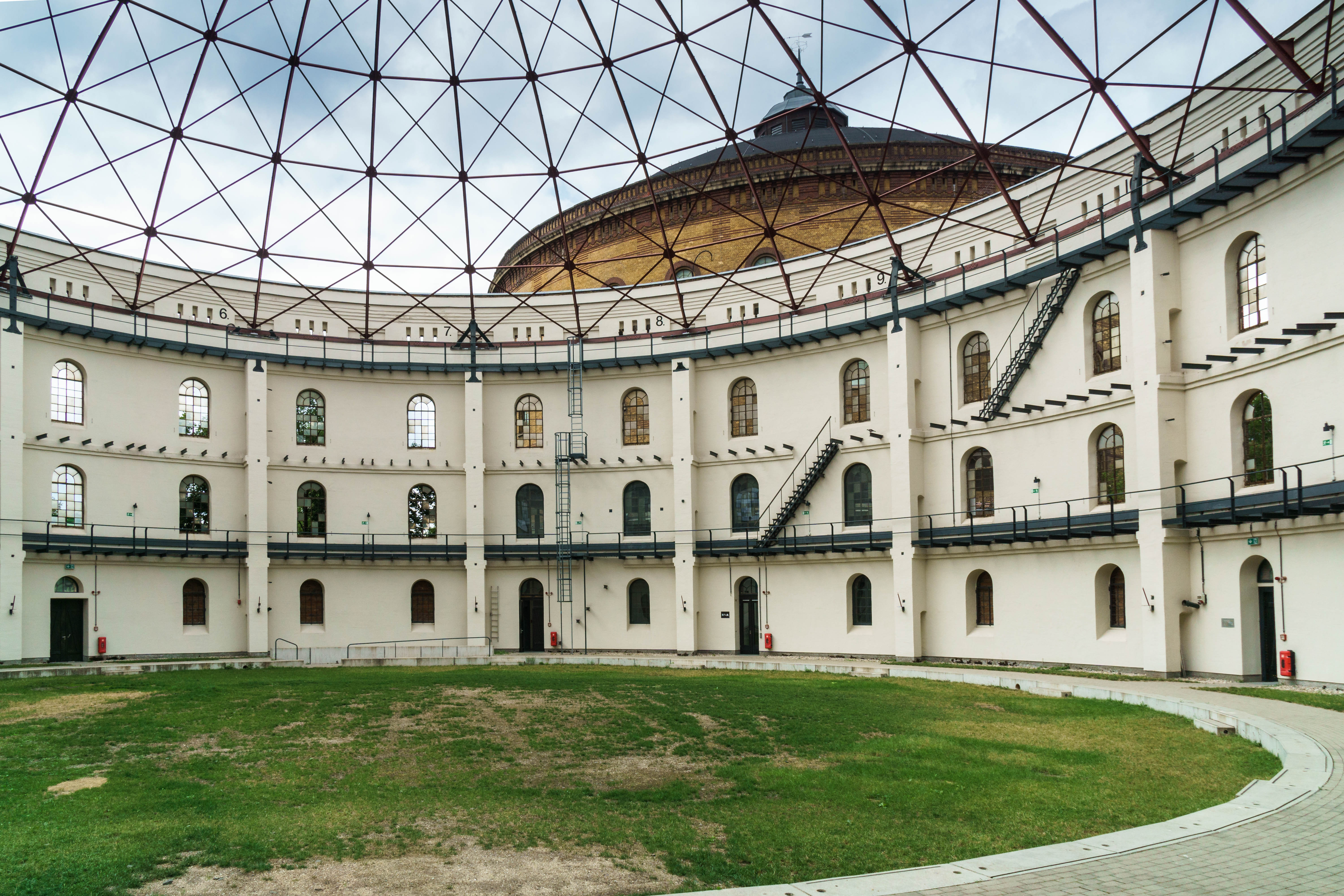
Inside Gasometer, next to the Panometer

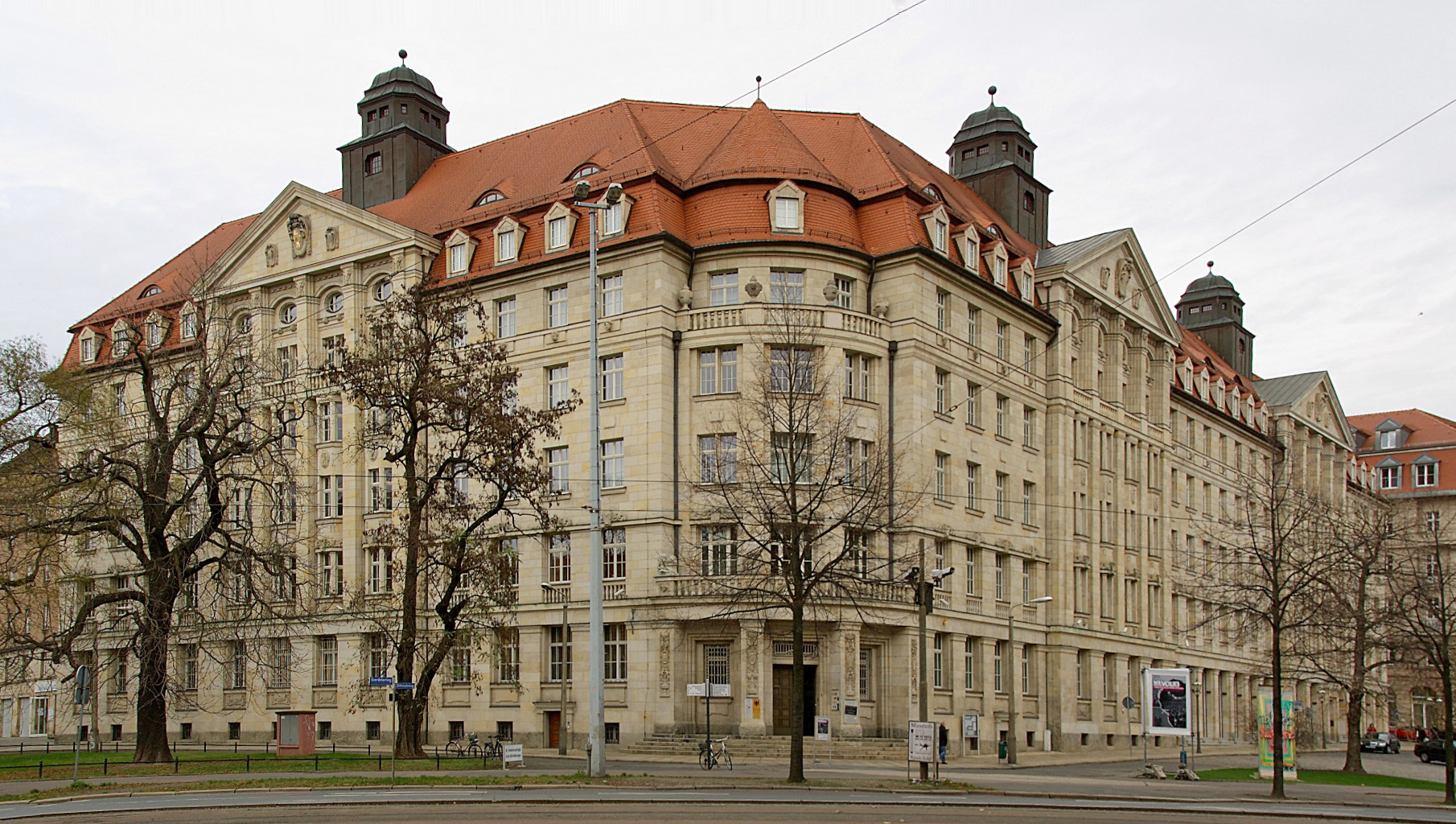
Museum in der Runden Ecke

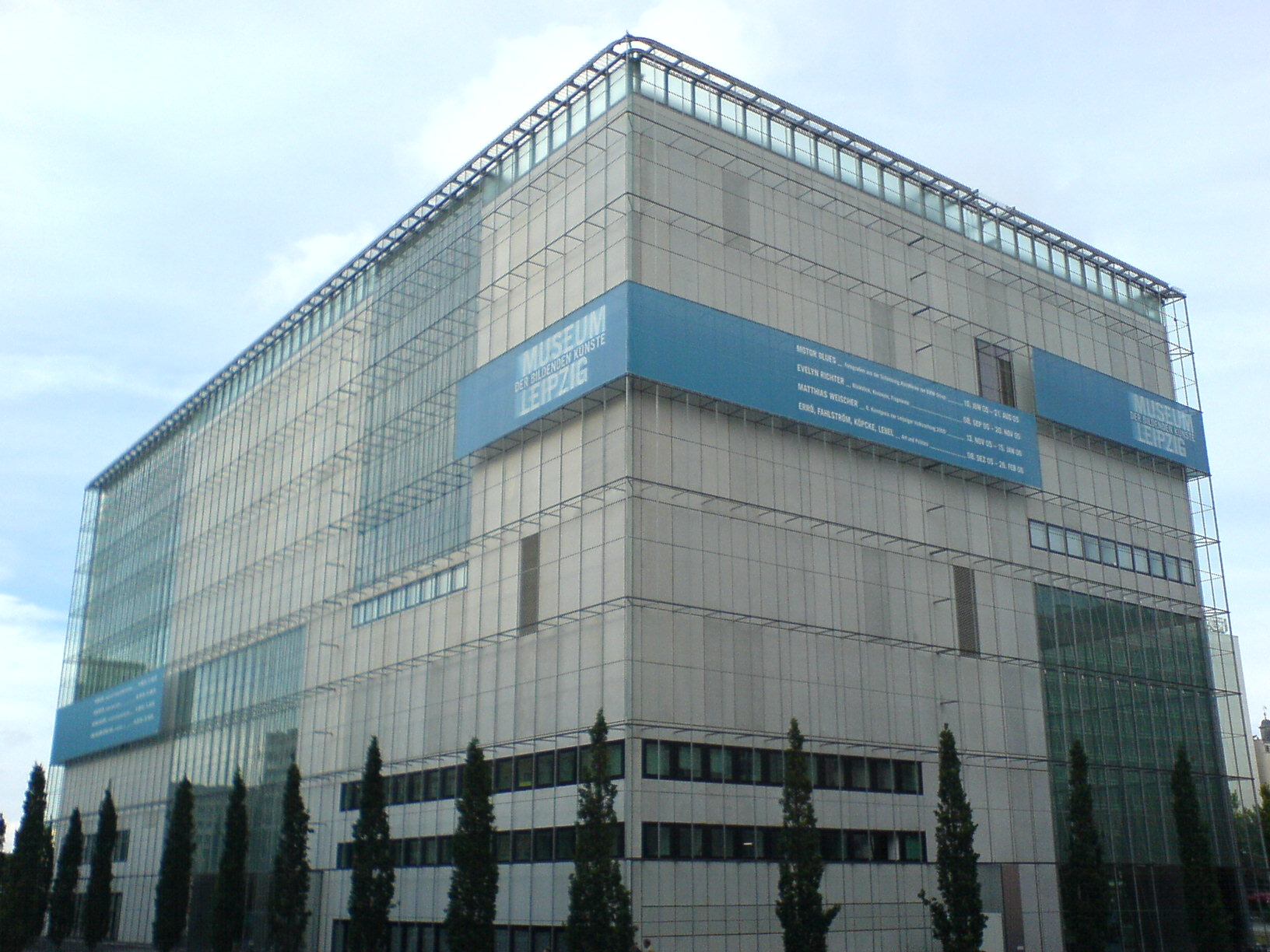
Museum of Fine Arts

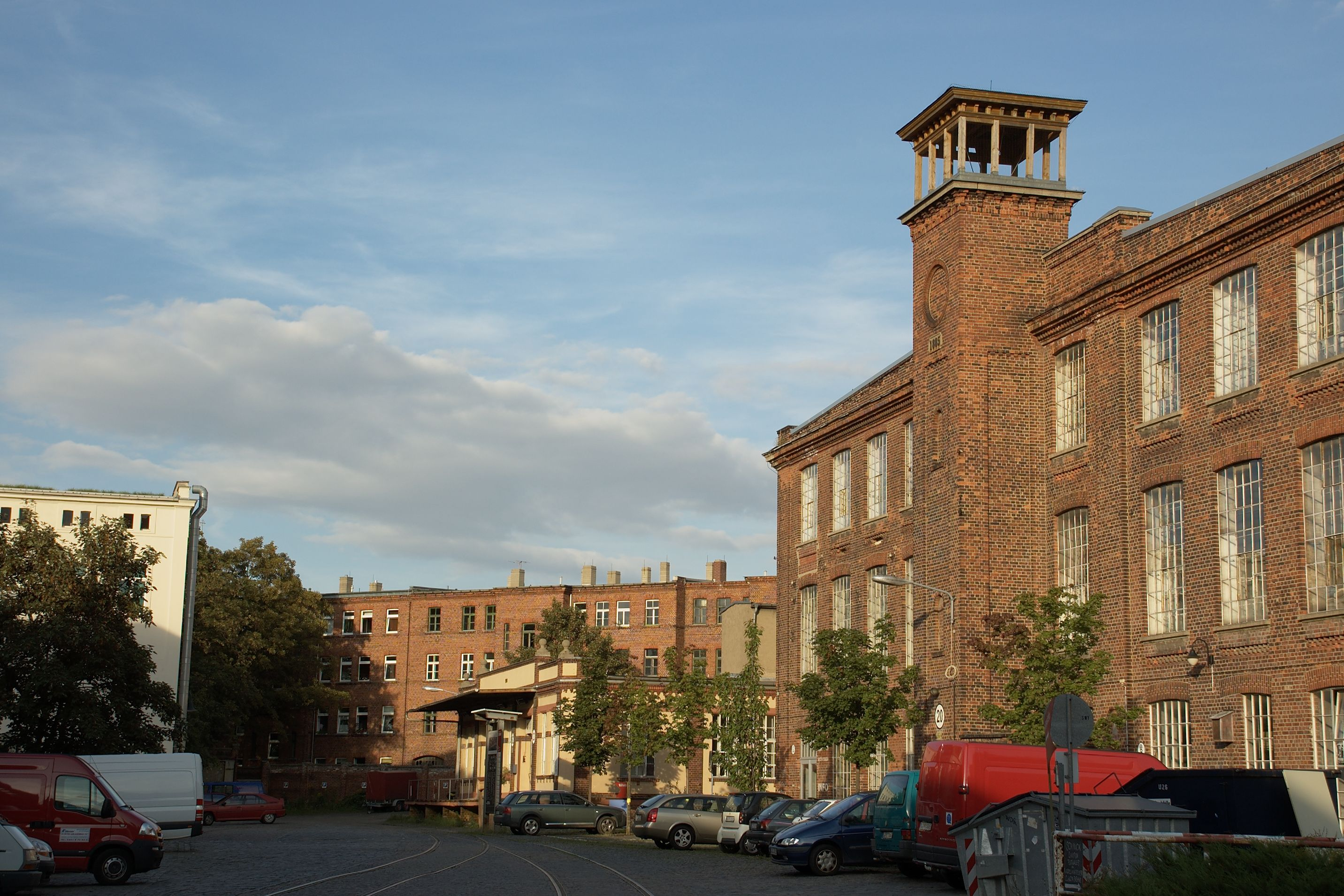
Baumwollspinnerei

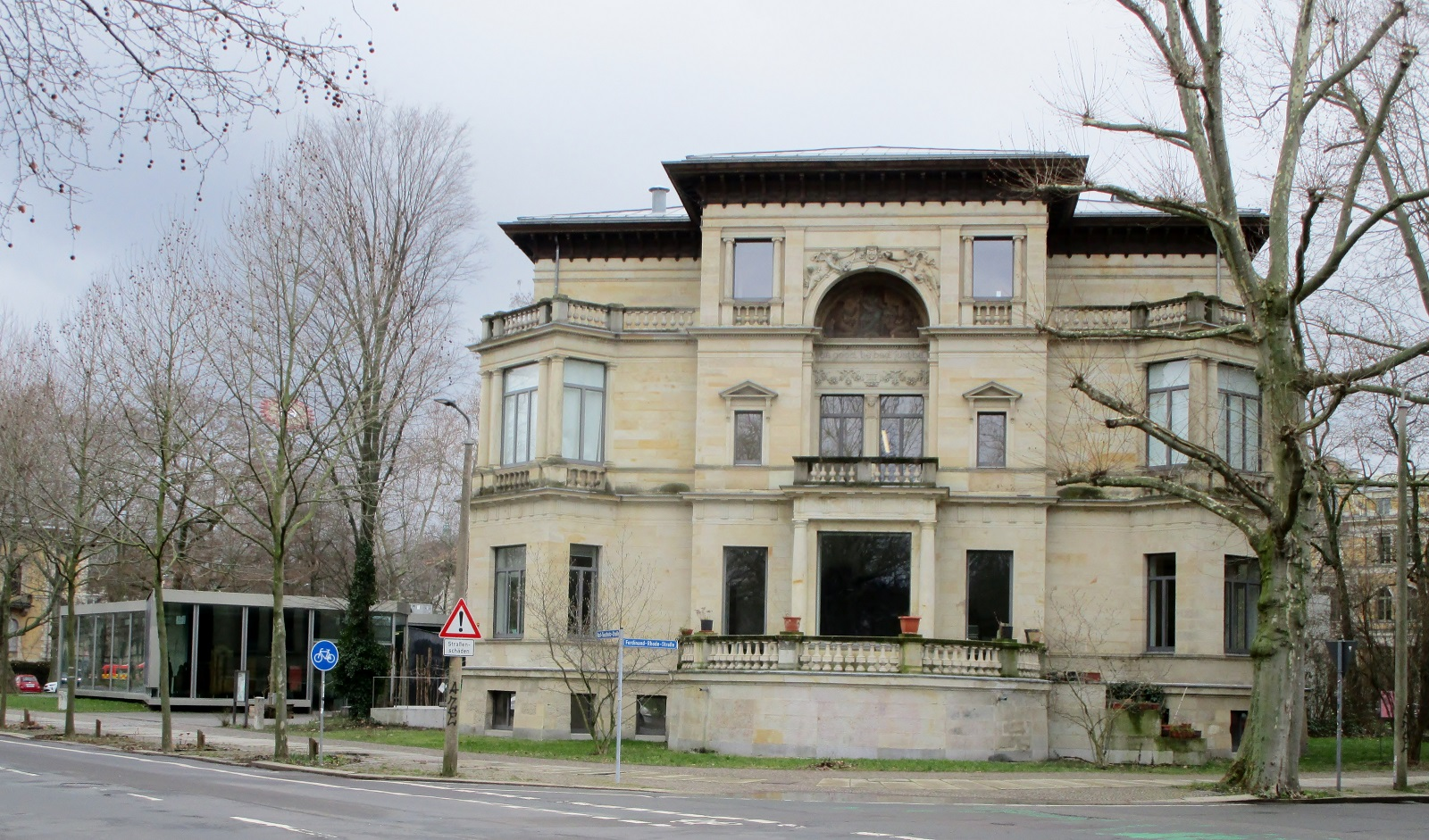
Galerie für Zeitgenössische Kunst

=== Main sights ===
- Leipzig Zoological Garden is one of the most modern zoos in Europe, with approximately 850 different animal species. It houses the world's largest zoological facilities for primates (Pongoland). Gondwanaland is the world's largest indoor rainforest hall.
- Monument to the Battle of the Nations (Völkerschlachtdenkmal) (Battle of the Nations Monument): one of the largest monuments in Europe, built to commemorate the victorious battle against Napoleonic troops.
- Bundesverwaltungsgericht: Germany's federal administrative court was the site of the Reichsgericht, the highest state court between 1888 and 1945.
- New Town Hall: the city's administrative building was built upon the remains of the Pleissenburg, a castle that was the site of the 1519 debate between Johann Eck and Martin Luther. It is also Germany's tallest town hall.
- Old Town Hall on the Market square: the old city hall was built in 1556 and houses a museum of the city's history.
- City-Hochhaus Leipzig: built in 1972, the city's tallest habitable building is one of the top 25 tallest buildings in Germany.
- The Augusteum and Paulinum at Augustusplatz form the new main campus of the University of Leipzig.
- Leipzig Trade Fair centre in the north of the city is home to the world's largest levitated glass hall.
- Leipzig Hauptbahnhof is the world's largest railway station by floor area and a shopping destination.
- Auerbach's Cellar: a young Goethe imbibed in this basement-level restaurant while studying in Leipzig; it features as the location of a scene from his play Faust.
- The Old Leipzig bourse at Naschmarkt with the Goethe Monument.
- South Cemetery (Südfriedhof) is, with an area of 82 hectares (200 acres), the largest cemetery in Leipzig.
- The German National Library has two locations, one of them in Leipzig.
- Leipzig Bayerischer Bahnhof is Germany's oldest preserved railway station.
- Gohlis Palace (Gohliser Schlösschen)
- Leipzig Synagogue was destroyed by the Nazis in 1938. Now a memorial of 140 bronze chairs stands where the pews once were.
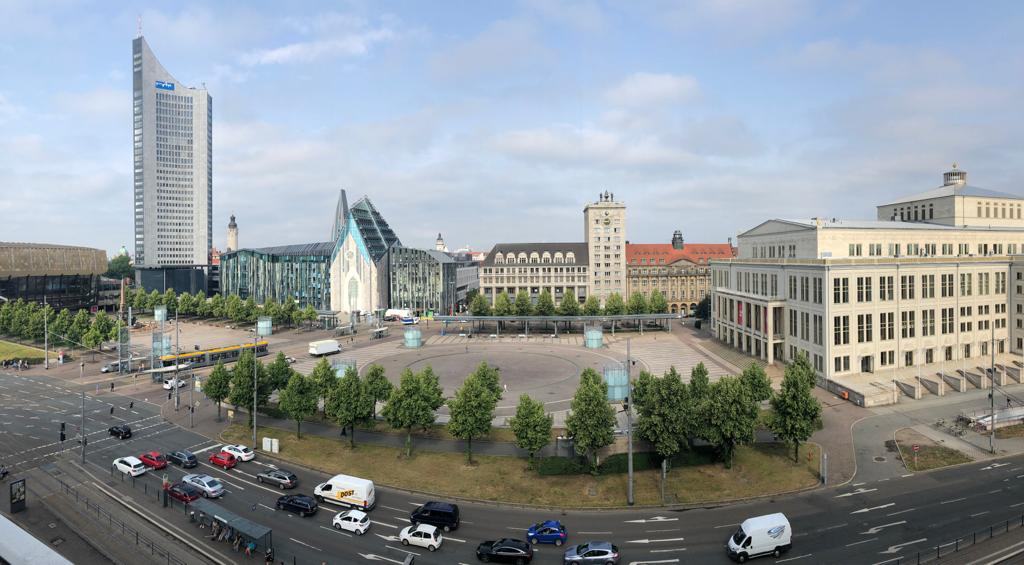
Augustusplatz

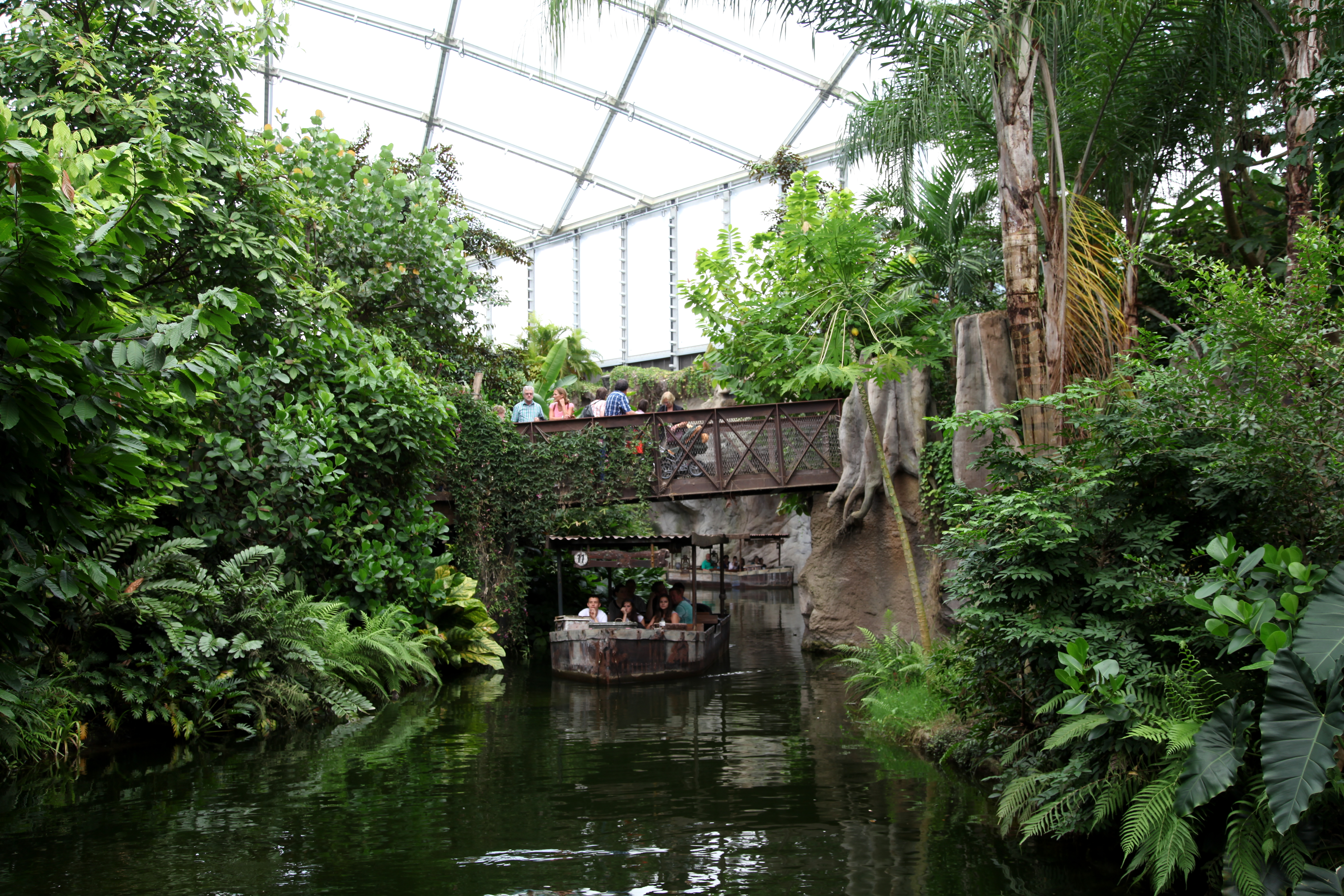
Inside Gondwanaland at Leipzig Zoological Garden

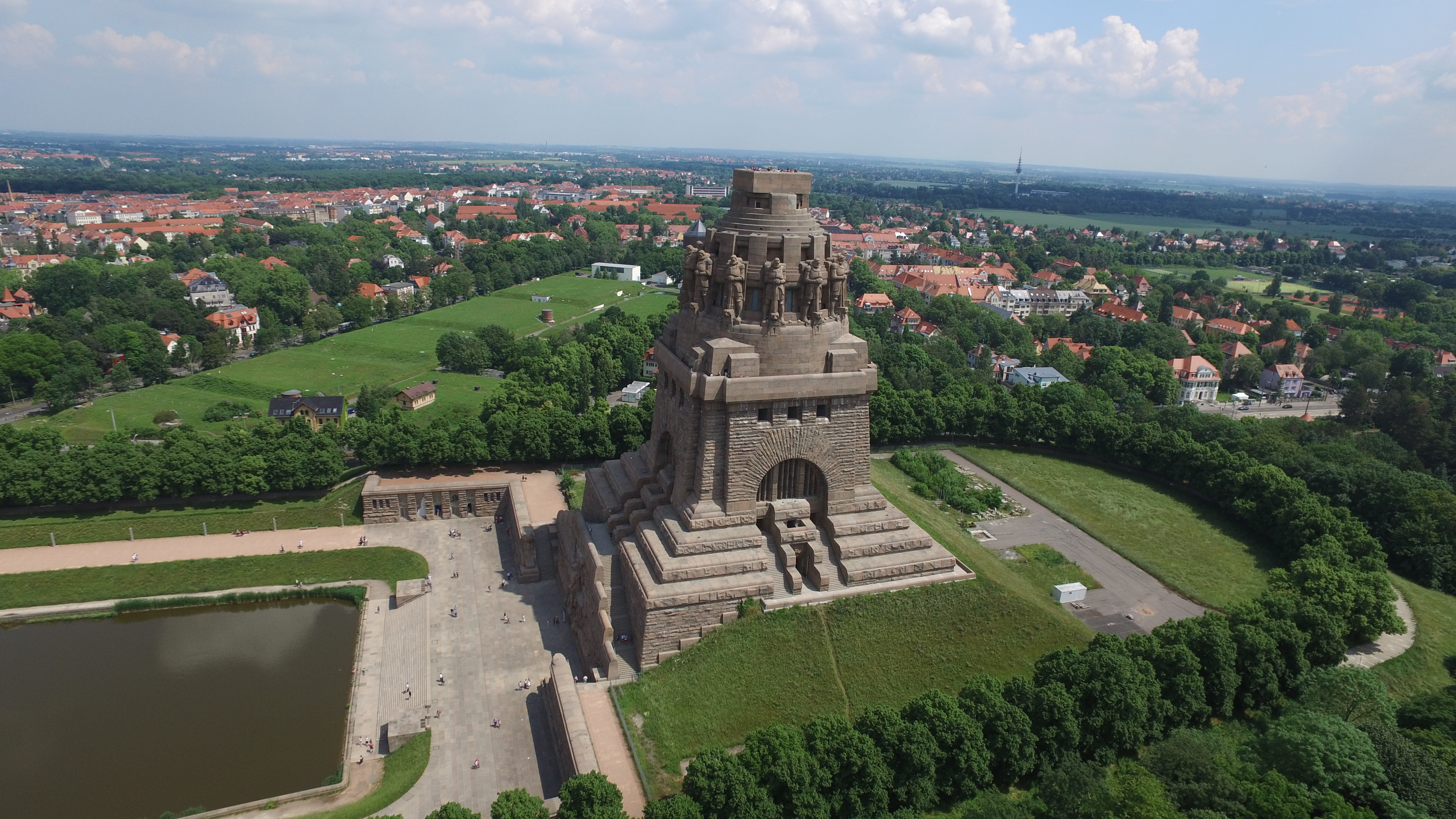
Monument to the Battle of the Nations

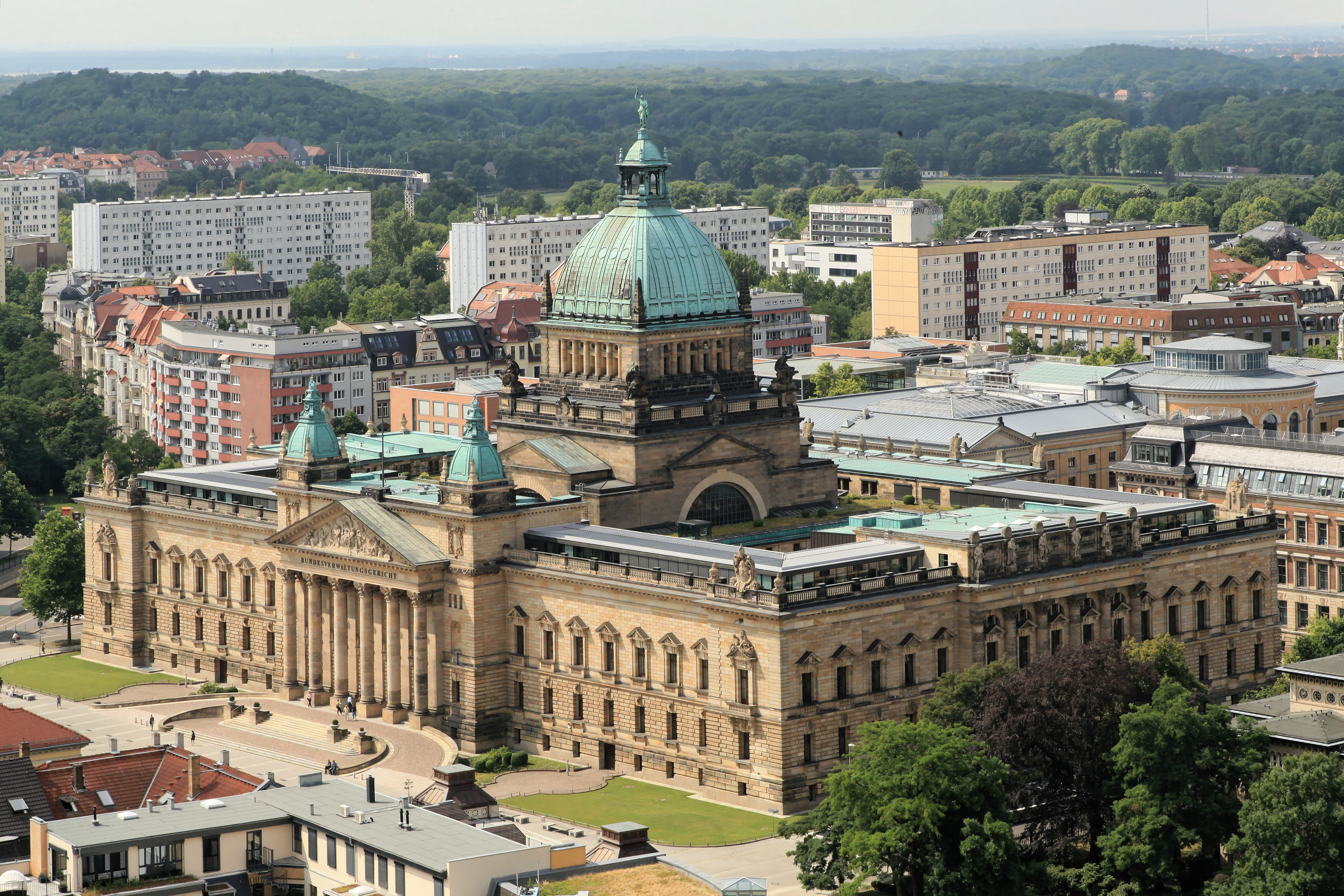
Federal Administrative Court of Germany

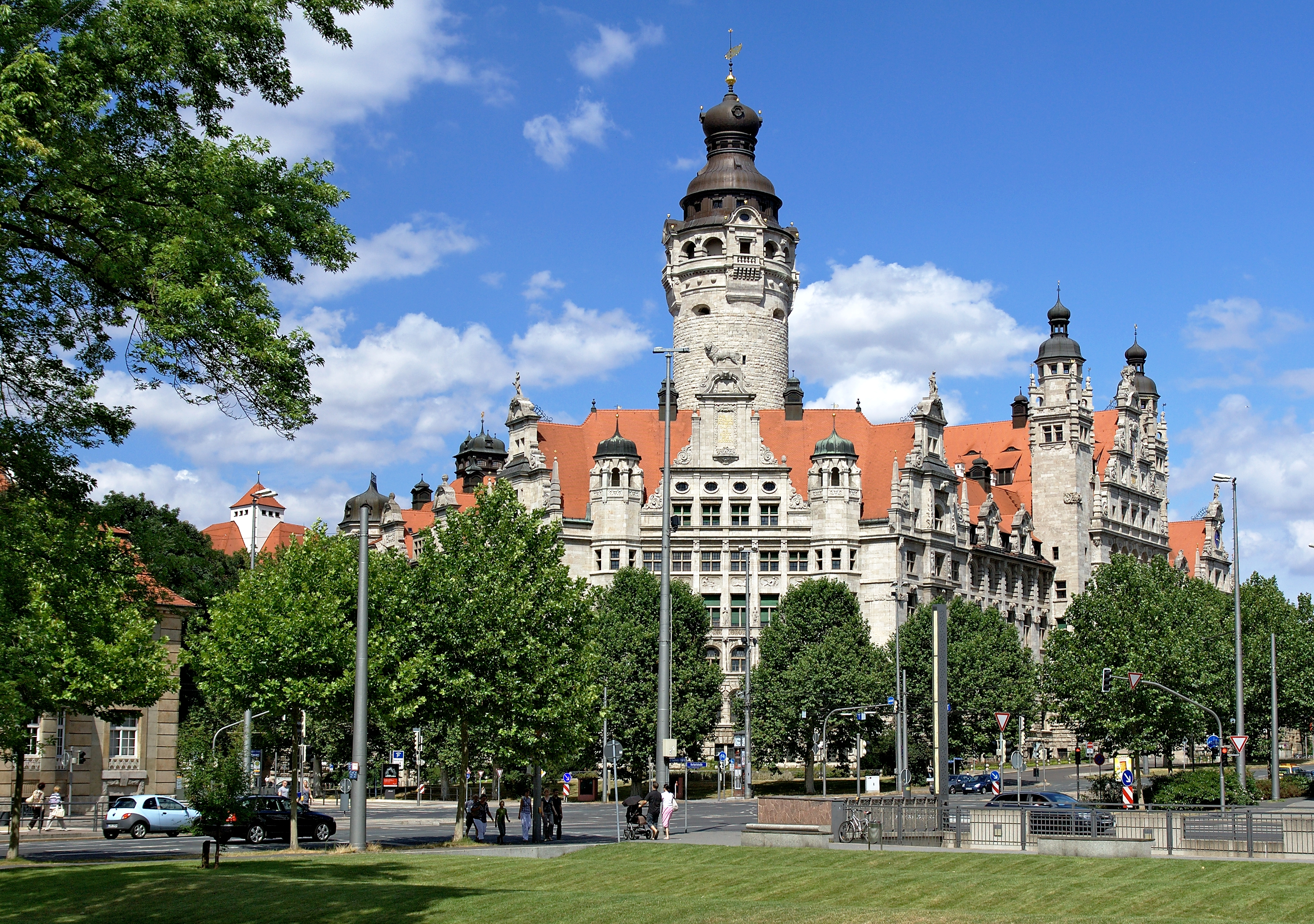
New city hall

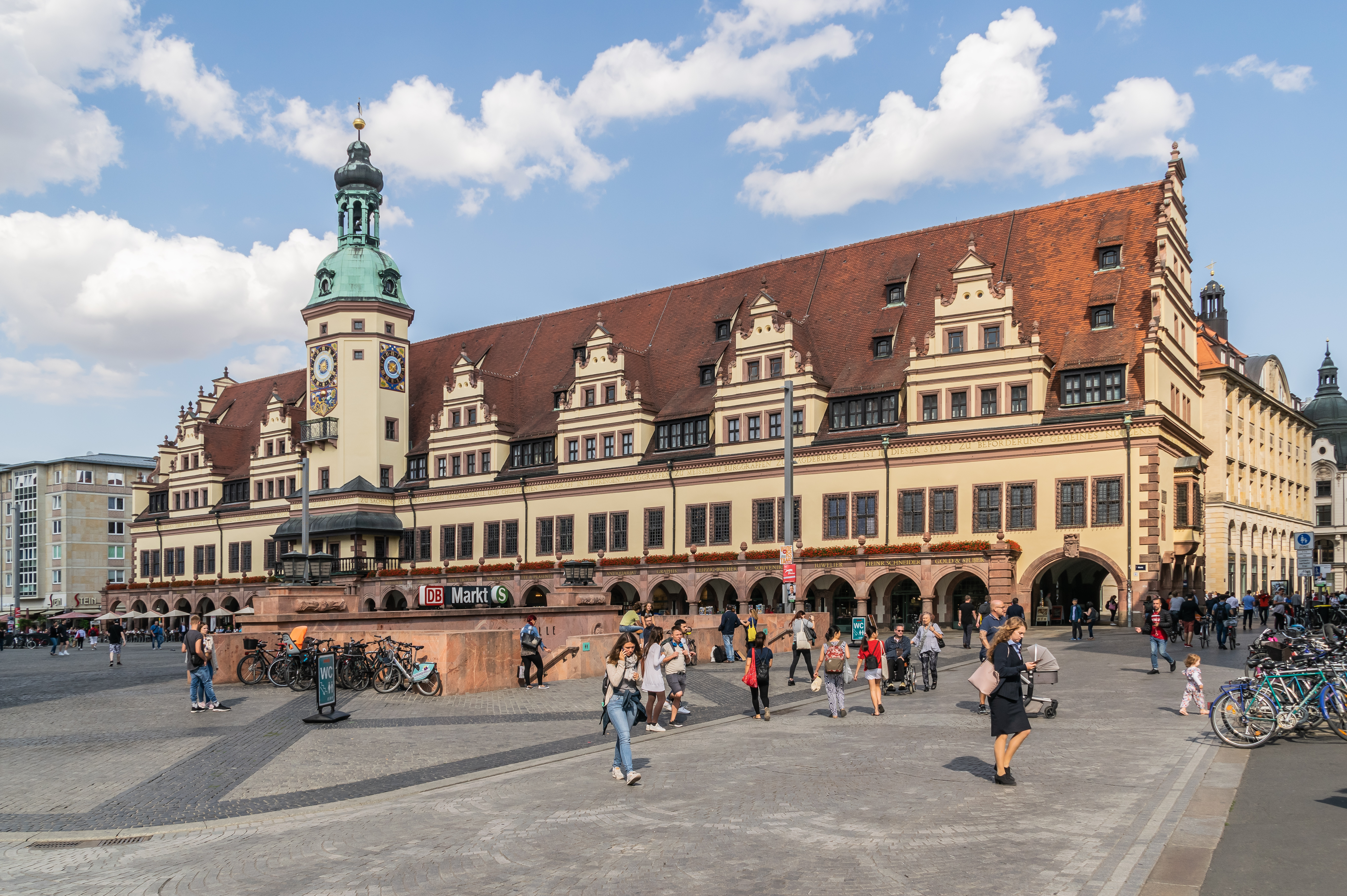
Old city hall at market square

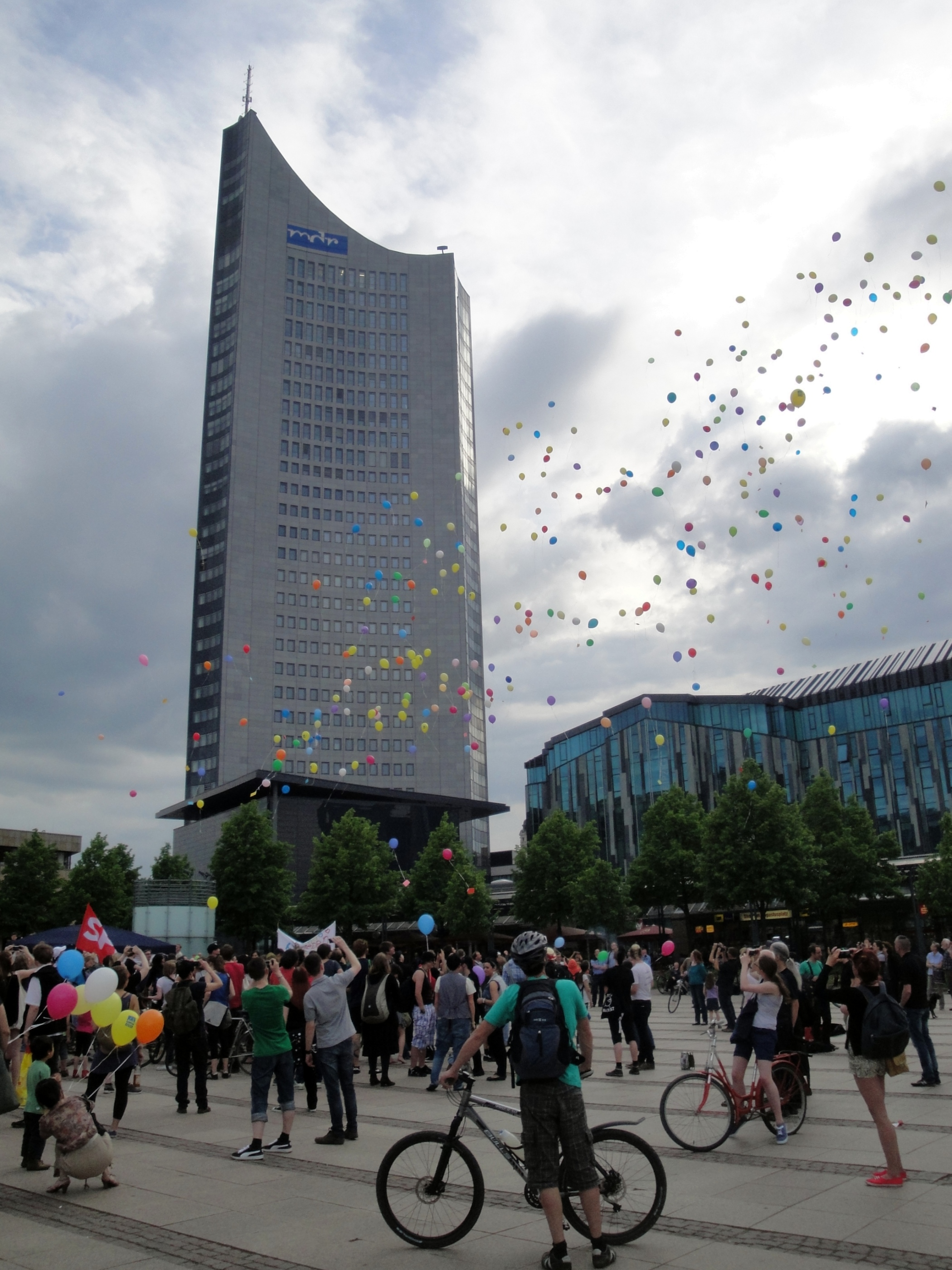
City-Hochhaus

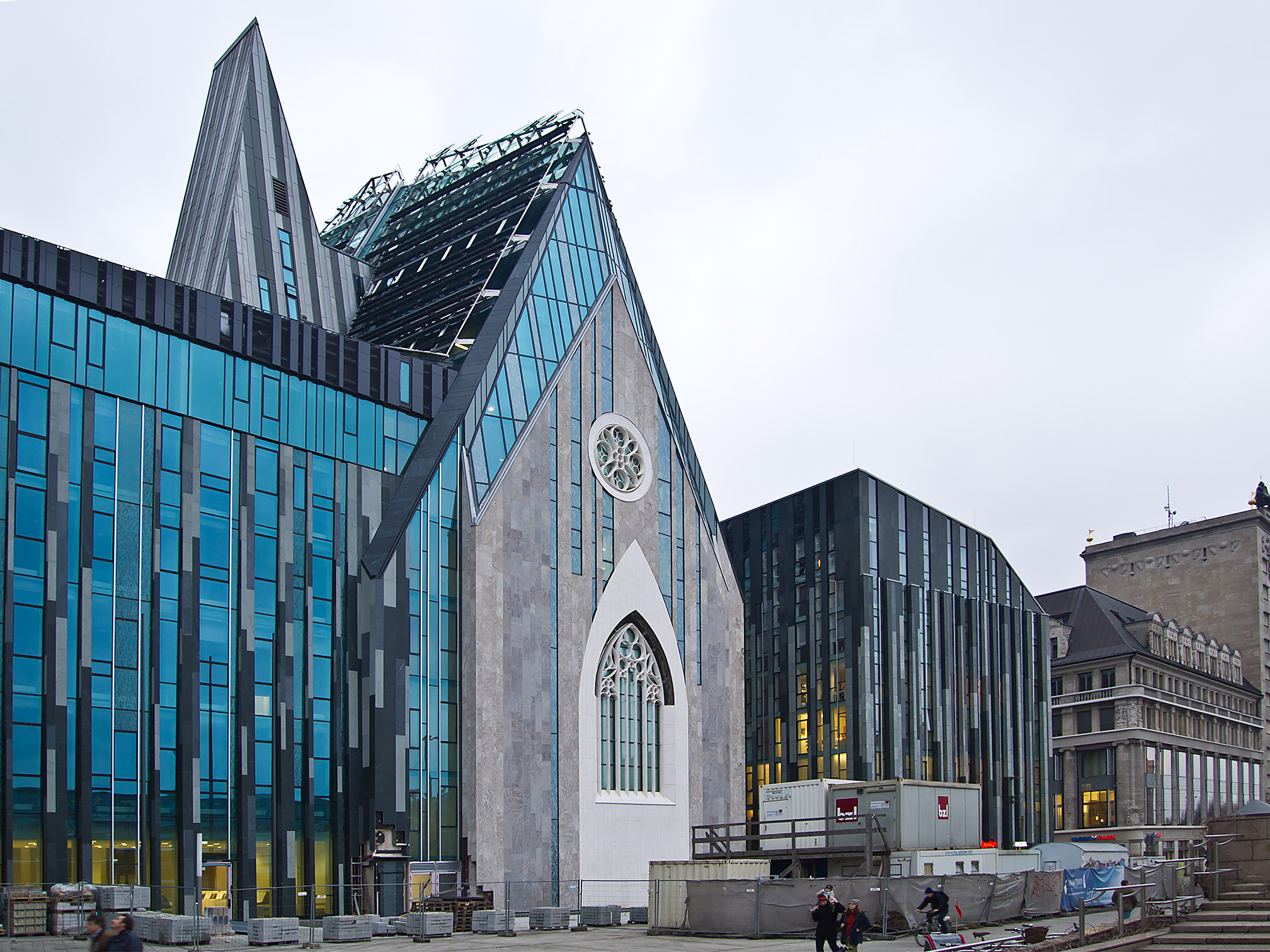
New Augusteum of the University of Leipzig

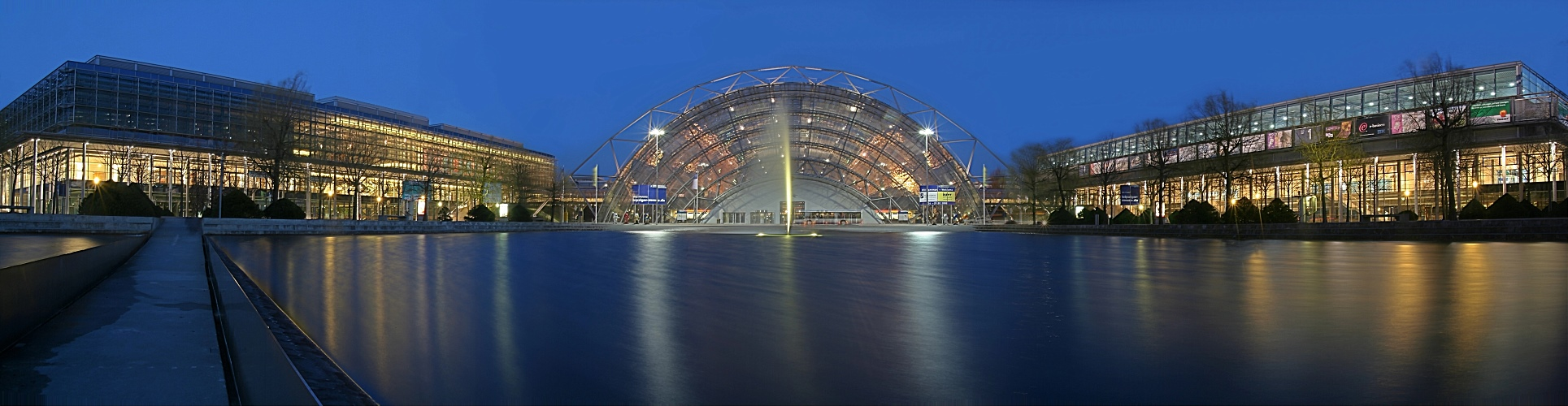
Leipzig Trade Fair

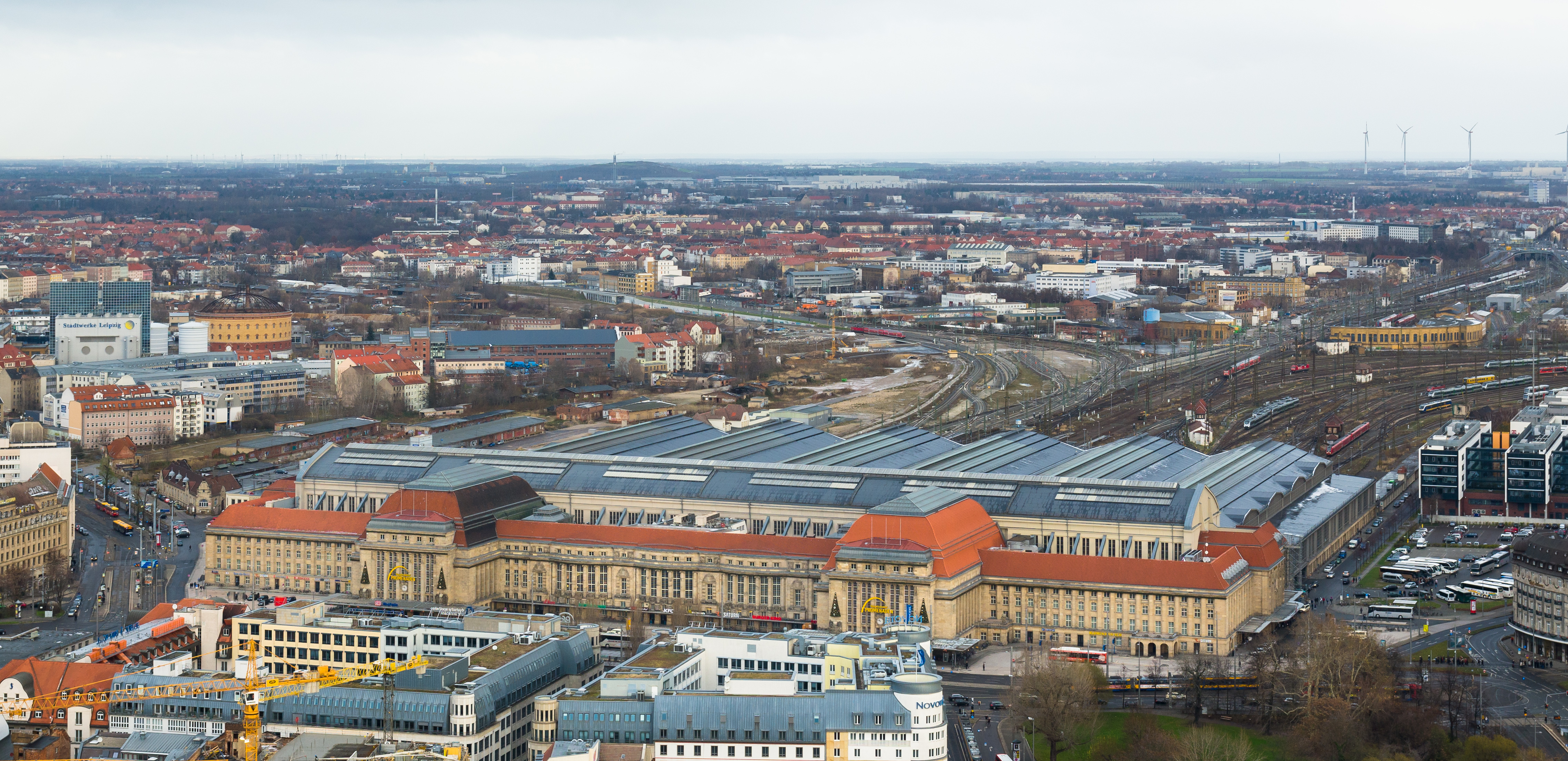
Leipzig main station

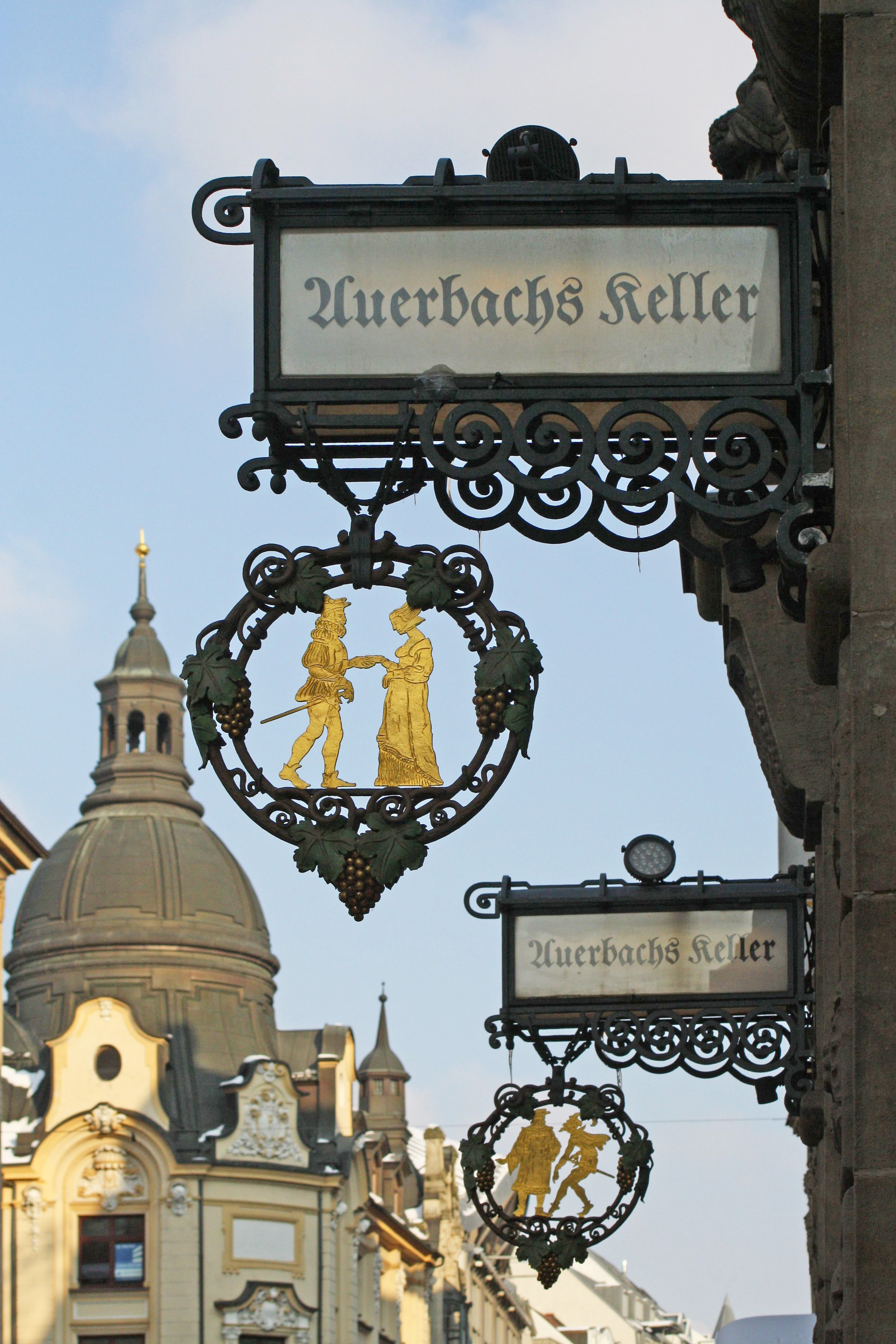
Auerbachs Keller in the Mädlerpassage

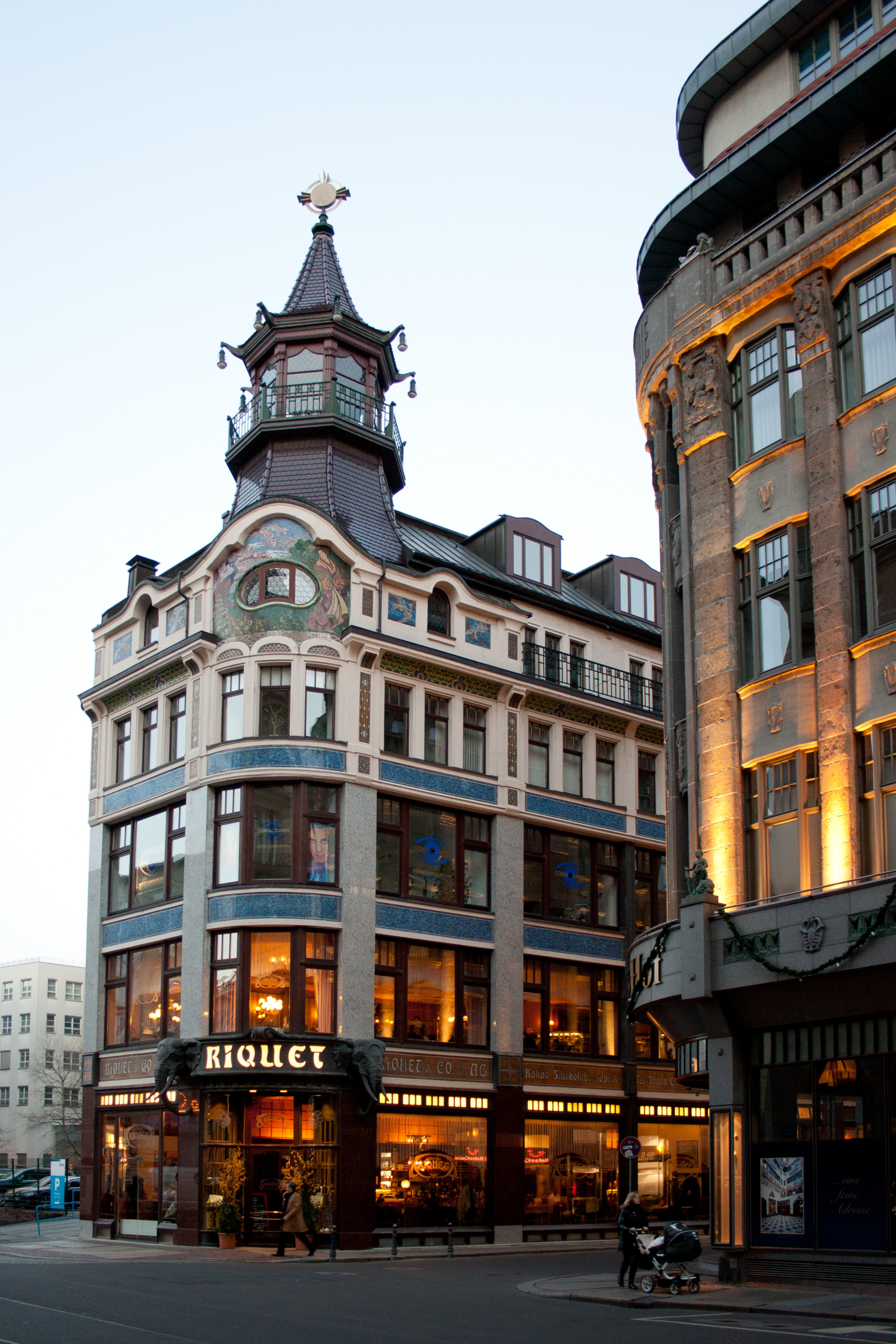
Riquethaus (former Tradehouse)

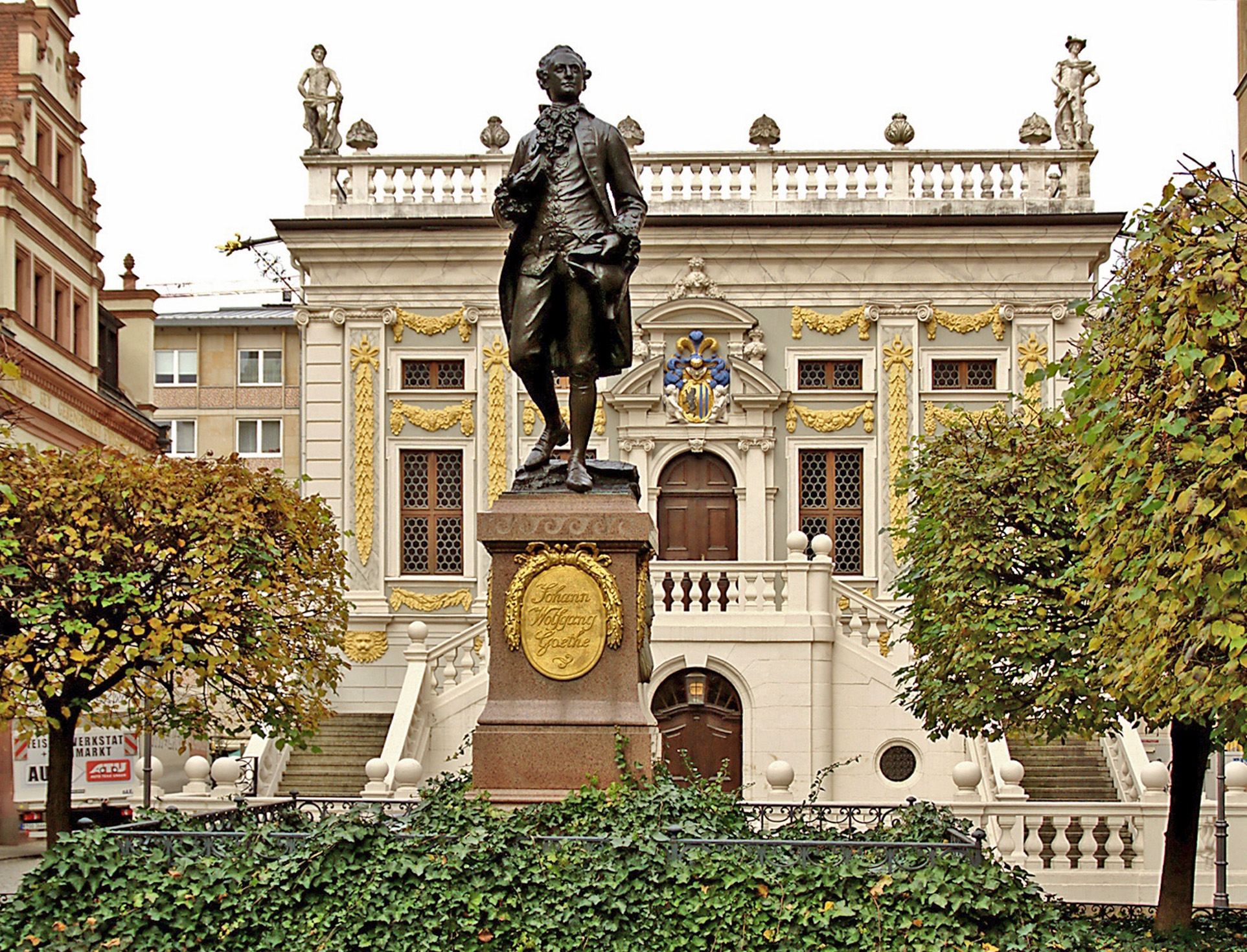
Old Leipzig bourse

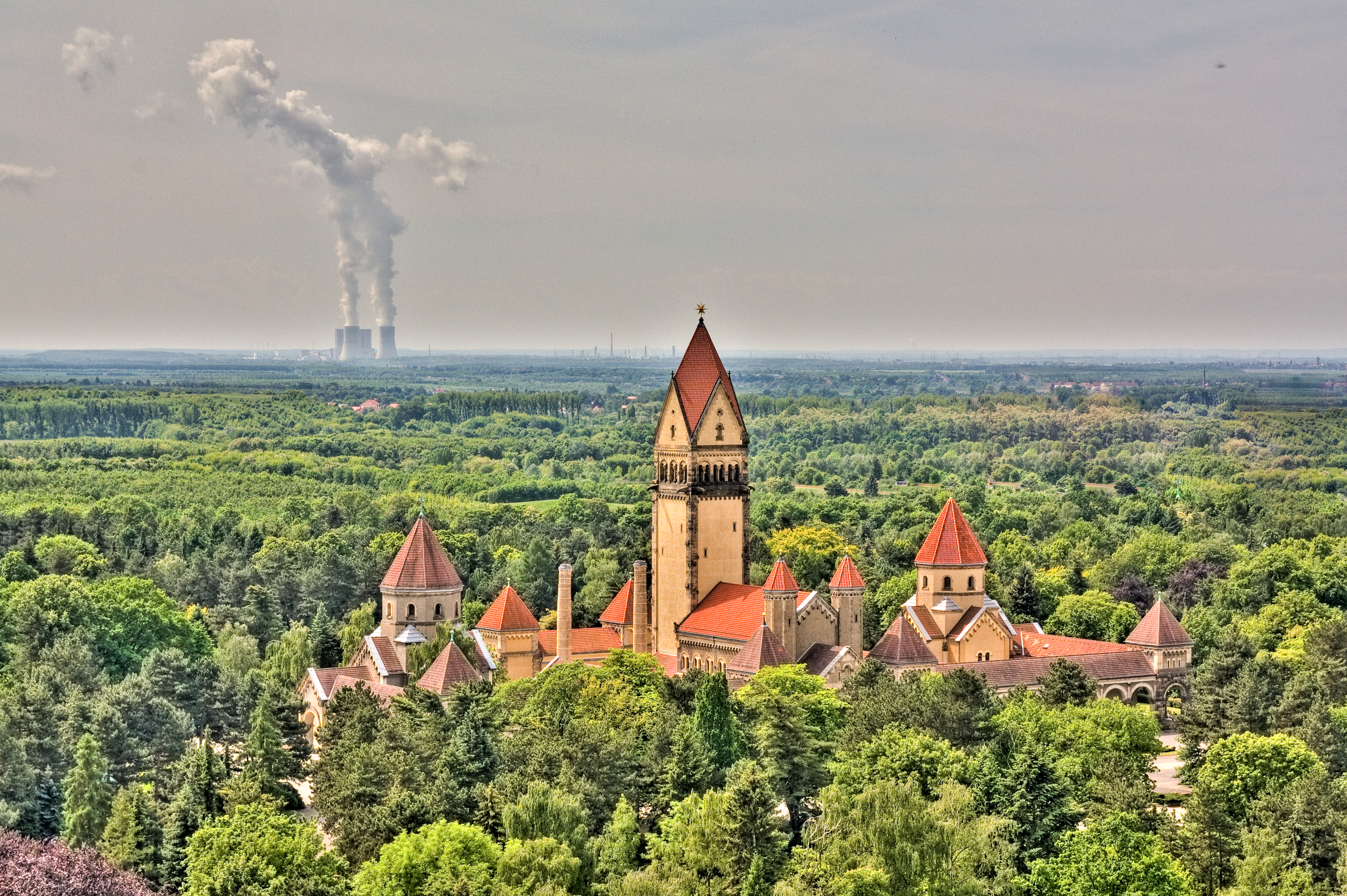
Südfriedhof

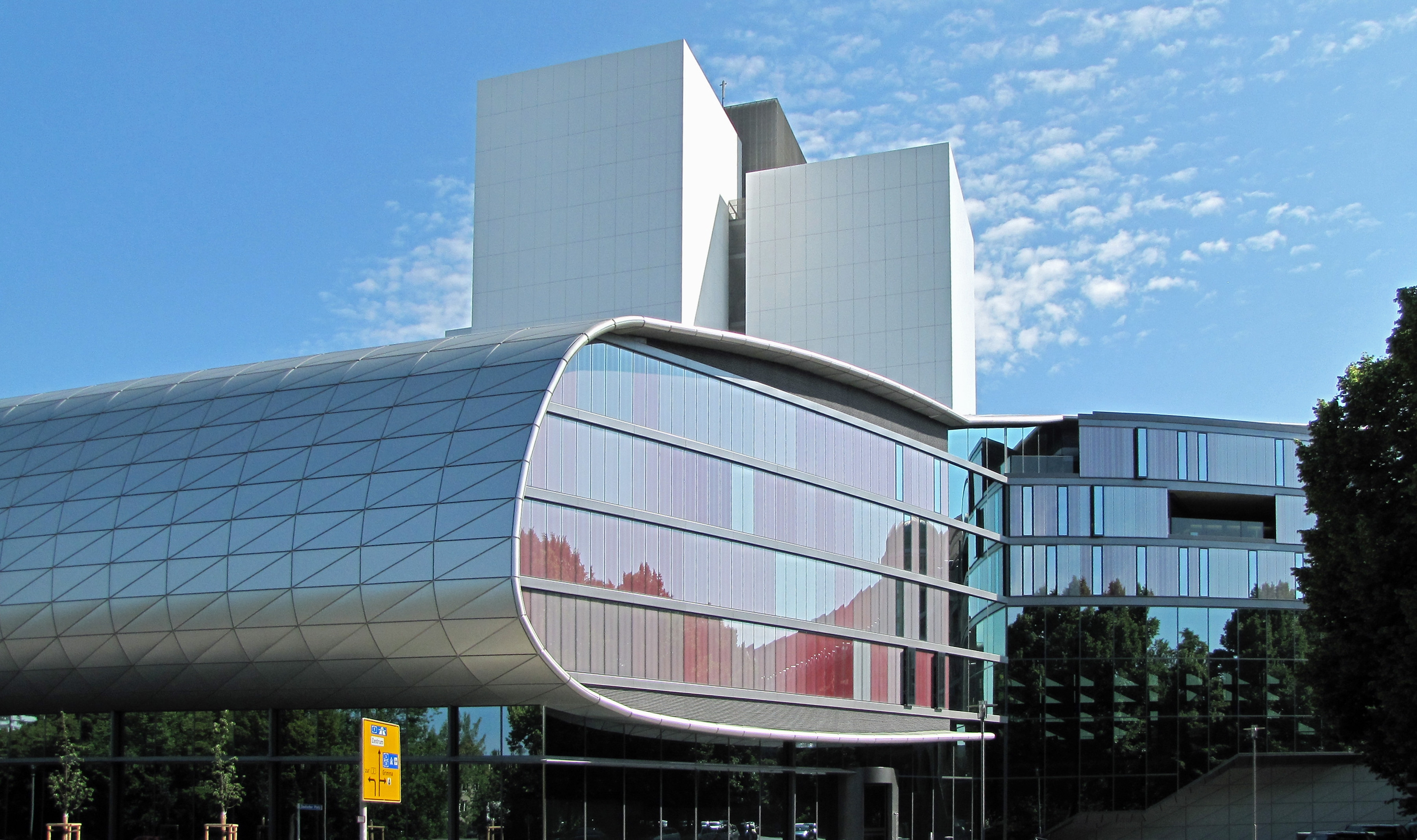
German National Library

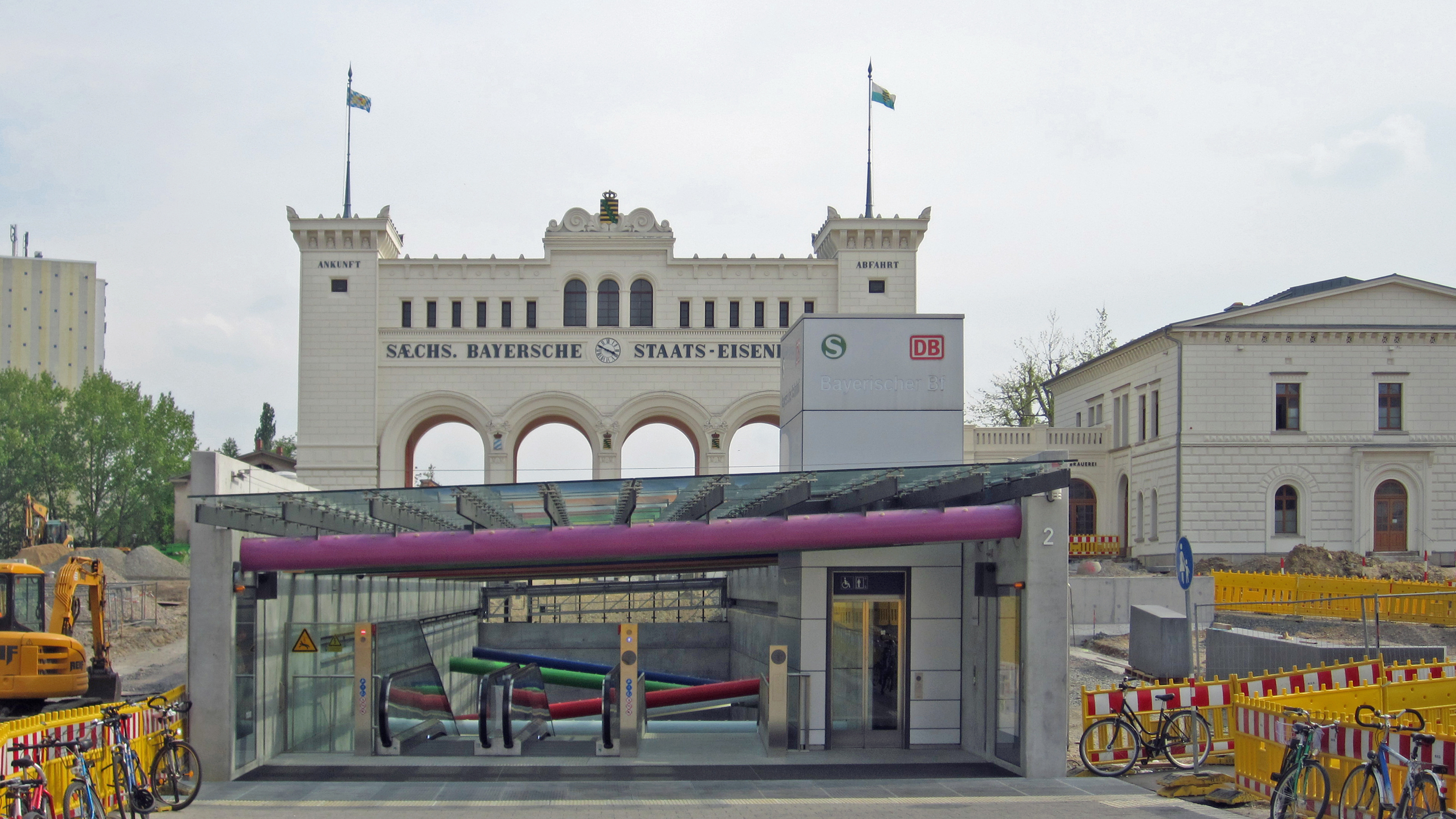
Leipzig Bayerischer Bahnhof

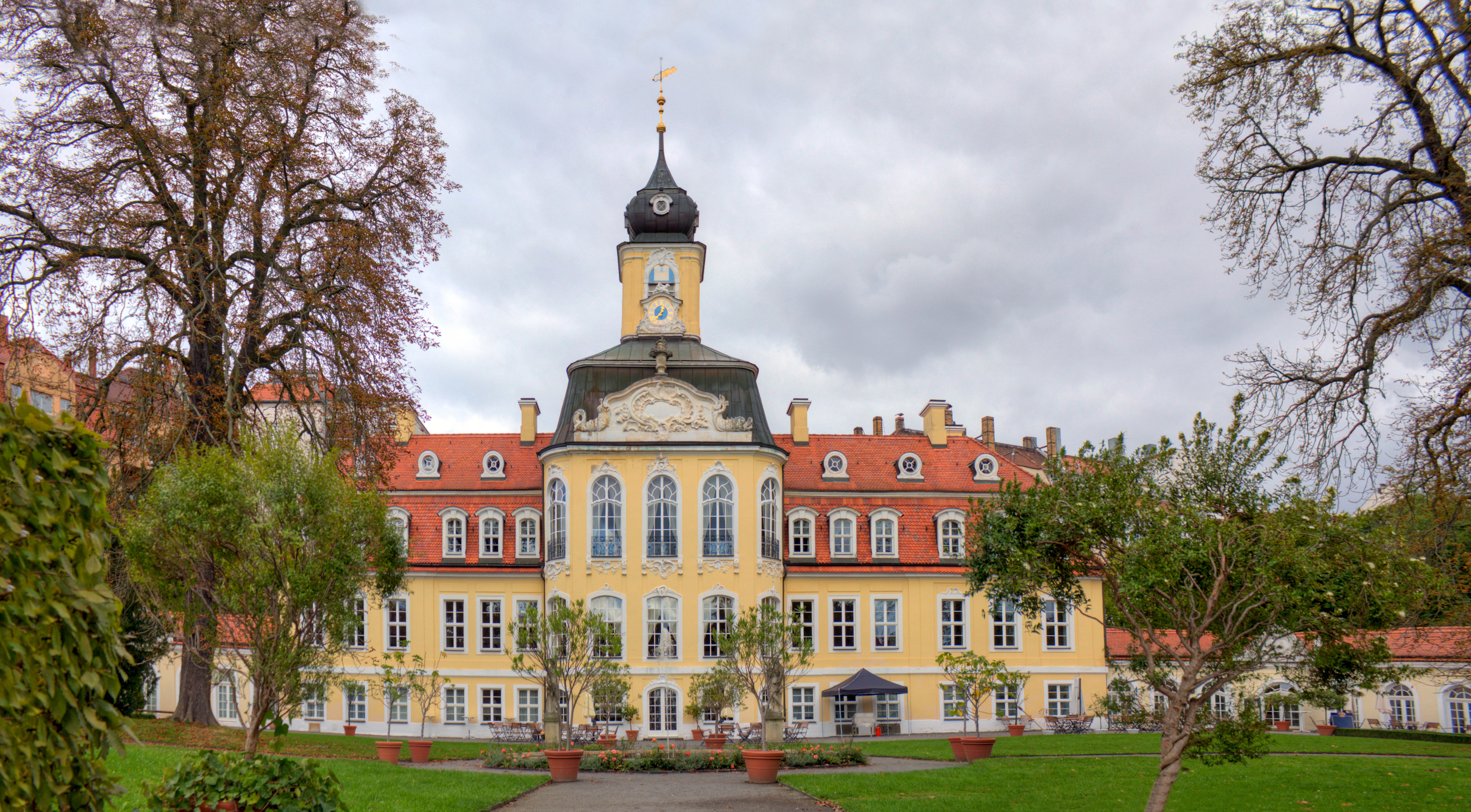
Gohlis Palace (Gohliser Schlösschen)

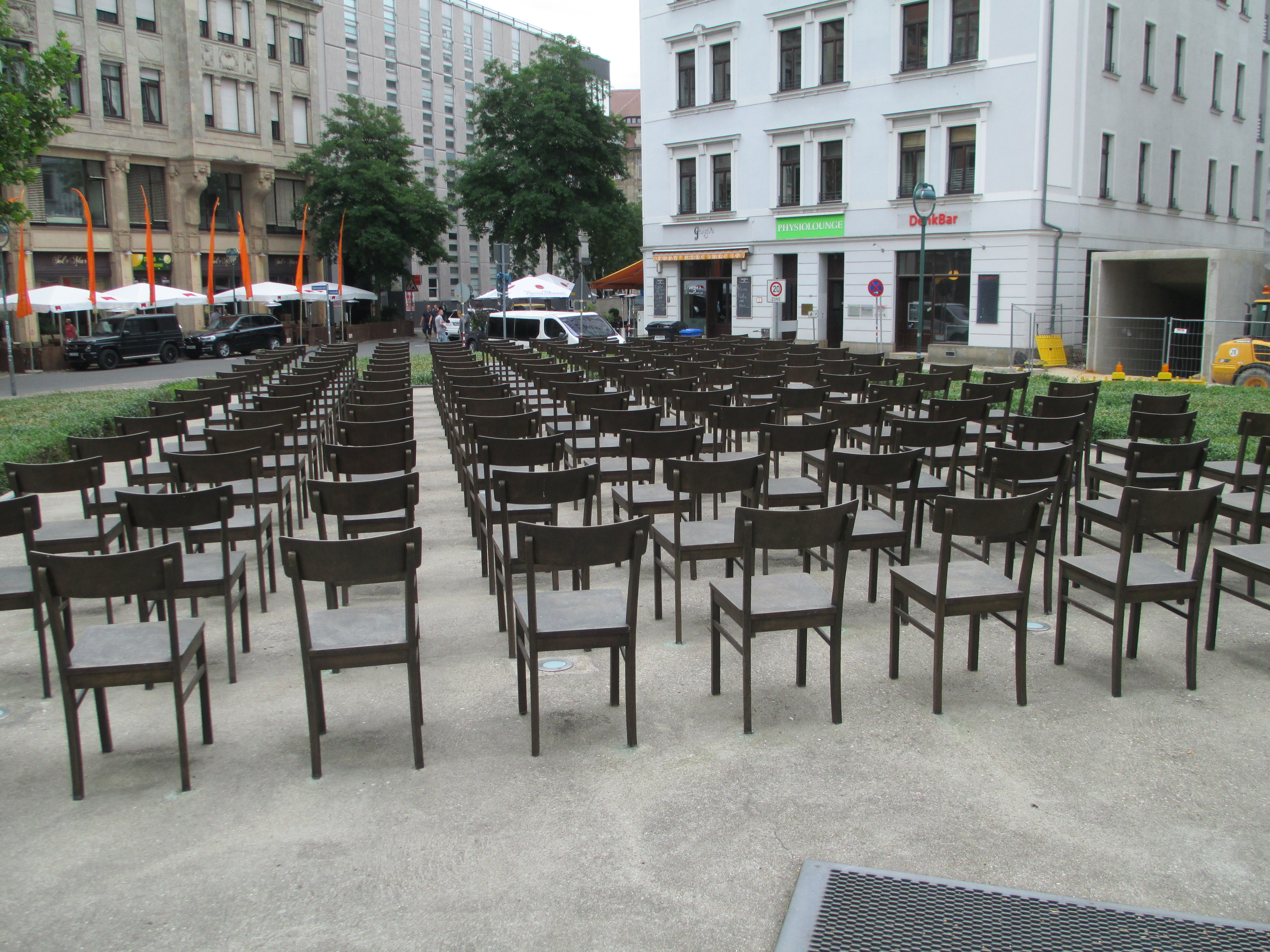
Leipzig Synagogue Memorial

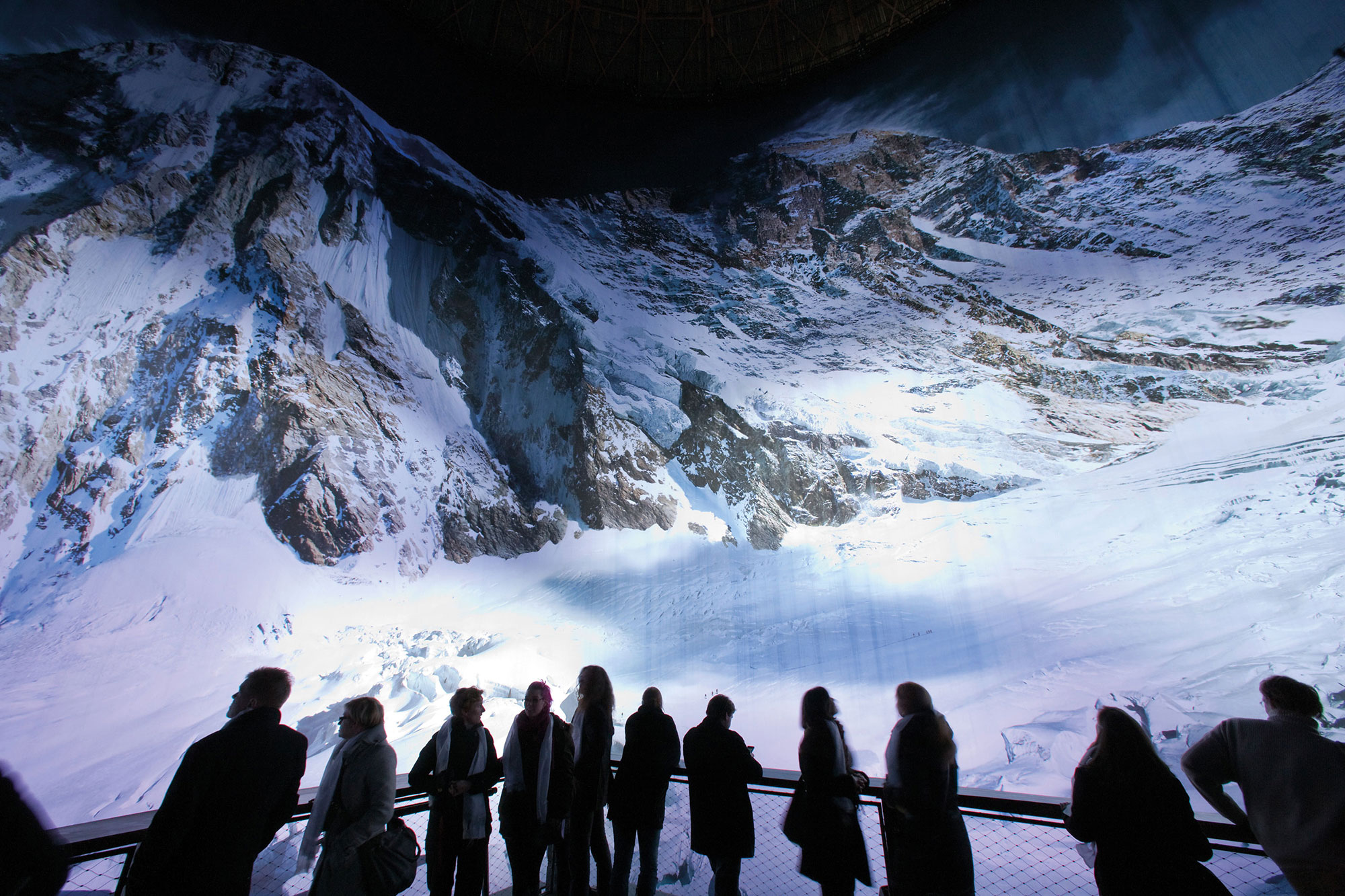
'Everest' at Leipzig Panometer

=== Churches ===
- St. Thomas's Church (Thomaskirche): most famous as the place where Johann Sebastian Bach worked as a cantor and home to the renowned boys choir Thomanerchor. A monument to Felix Mendelssohn stands in front of this church. Destroyed by the Nazis in 1936, the statue was re-erected on 18 October 2008.
- St. Nicholas's Church (Nikolaikirche), for which Bach was also responsible. The weekly Montagsgebet (Monday prayer) held here became the starting point of peaceful Monday demonstrations against the DDR regime in the 1980s.
- St. Peter's has the highest tower of any church in Leipzig, at 87 m (285 ft).
- The new Propsteikirche, opened in 2015.
- The Continental Reformed Church of Leipzig (Evangelisch-reformierte Kirche) is one of the most prominent buildings on the Leipzig Innercity ring.
- The Russian Memorial Church of Leipzig
- St. Michael's Church is one of the landmarks of Gohlis district.
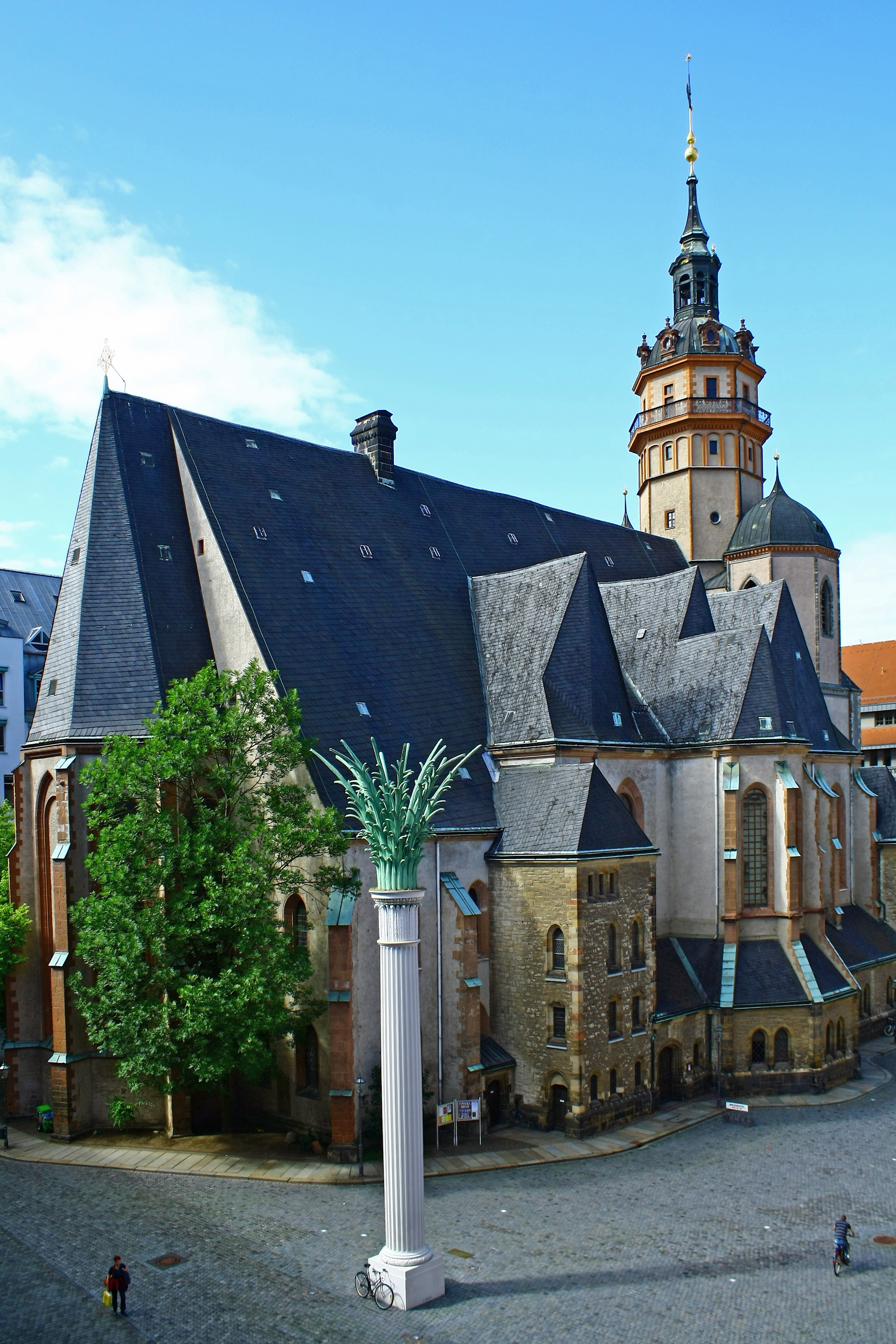
St. Nicholas Church

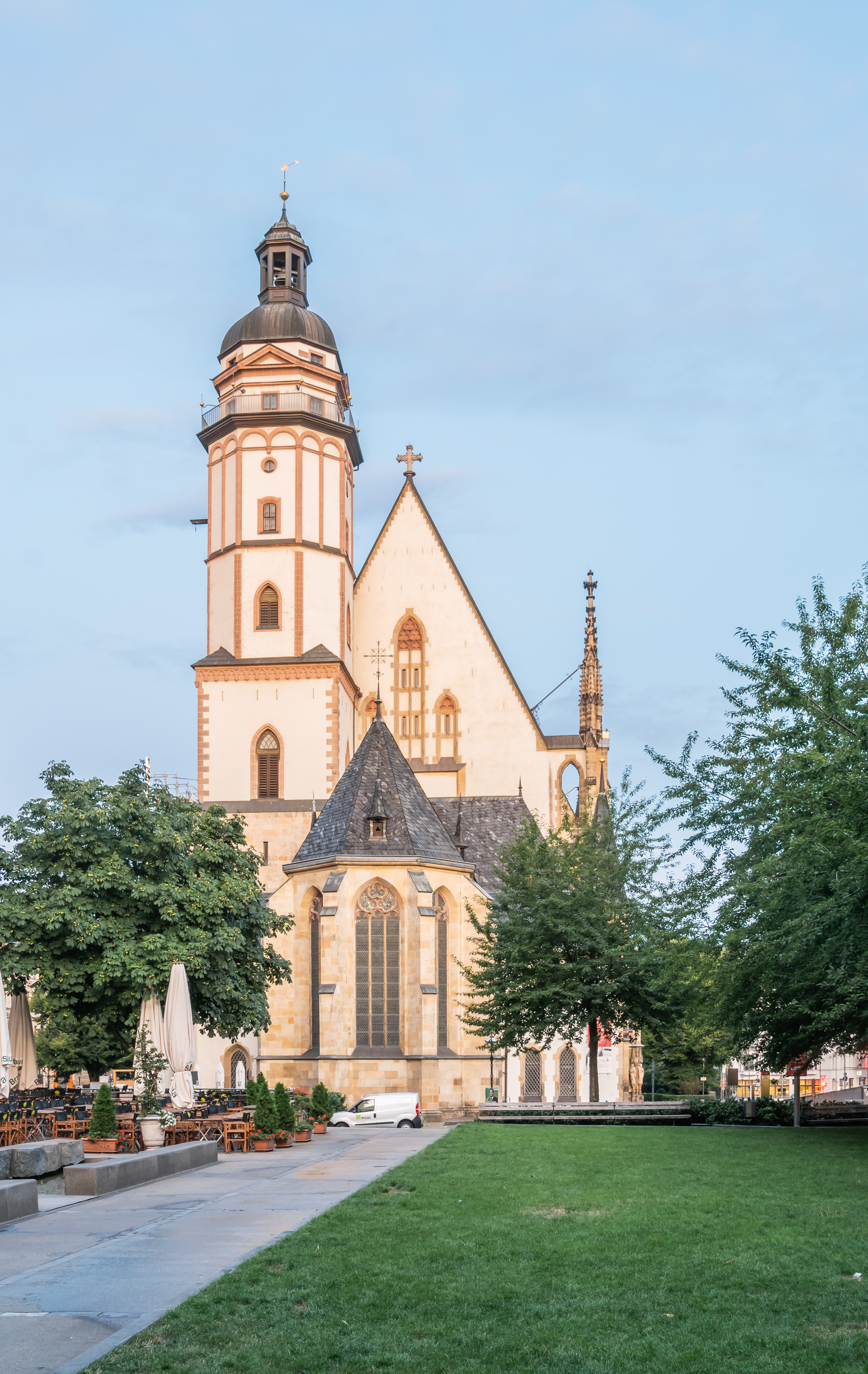
St. Thomas Church

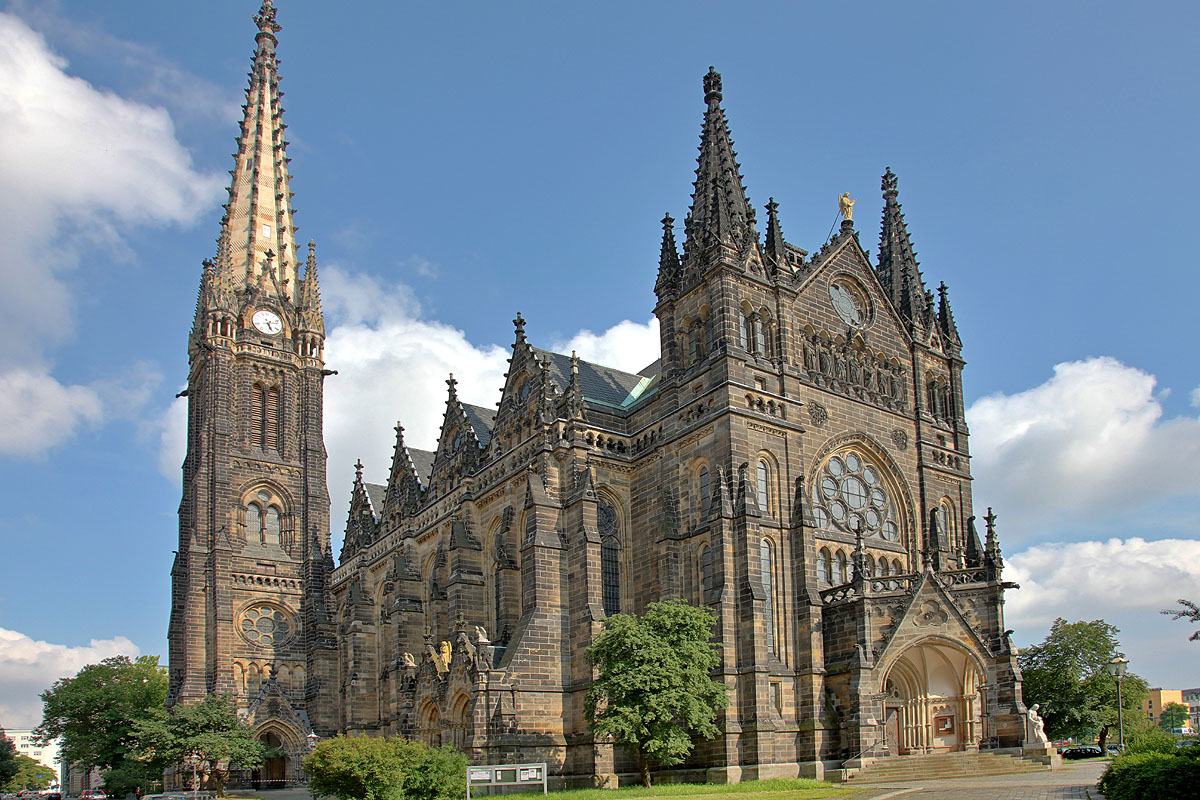
St. Peter's Church

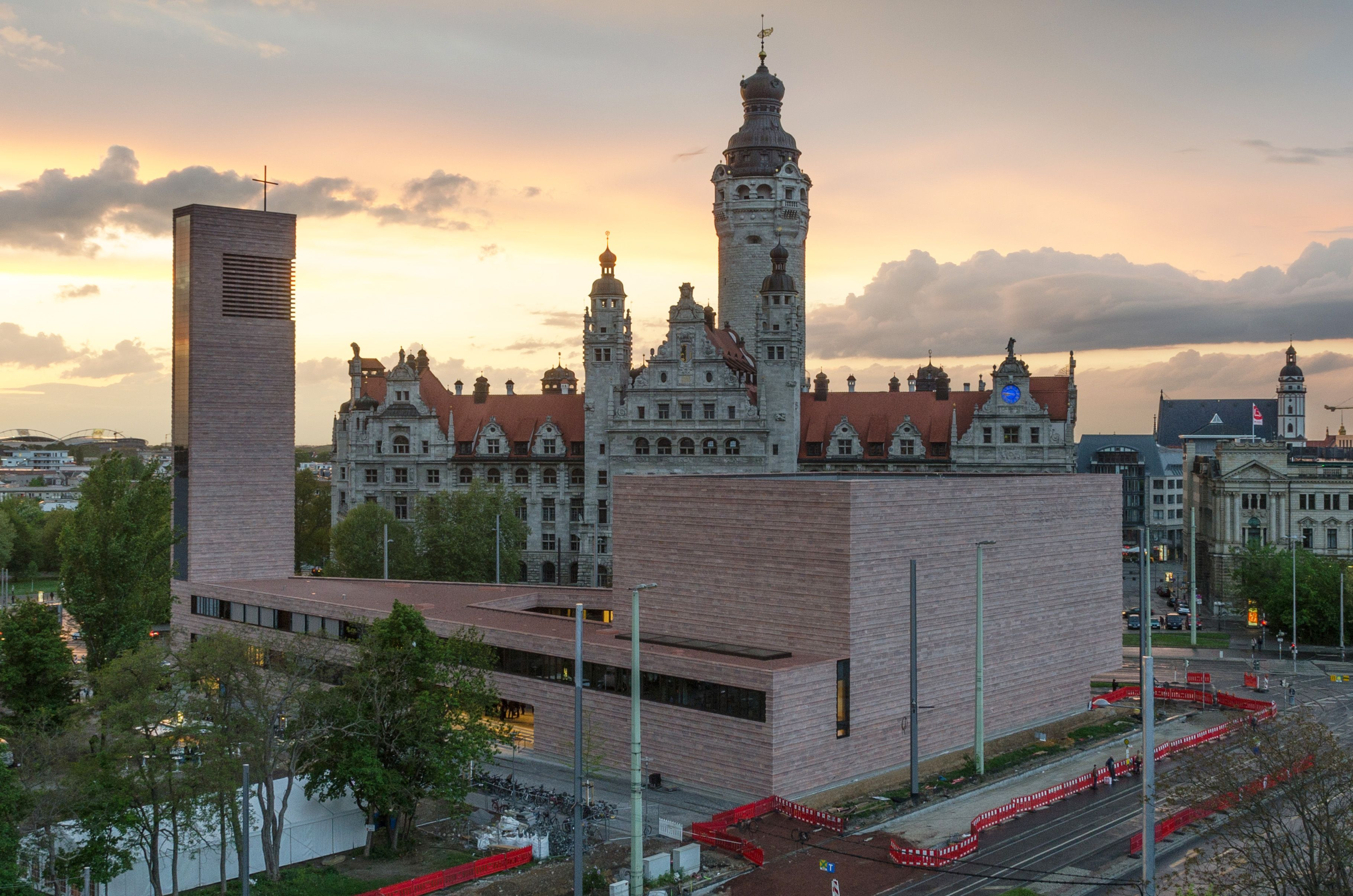
Propsteikirche in May 2015; New Town Hall in the background

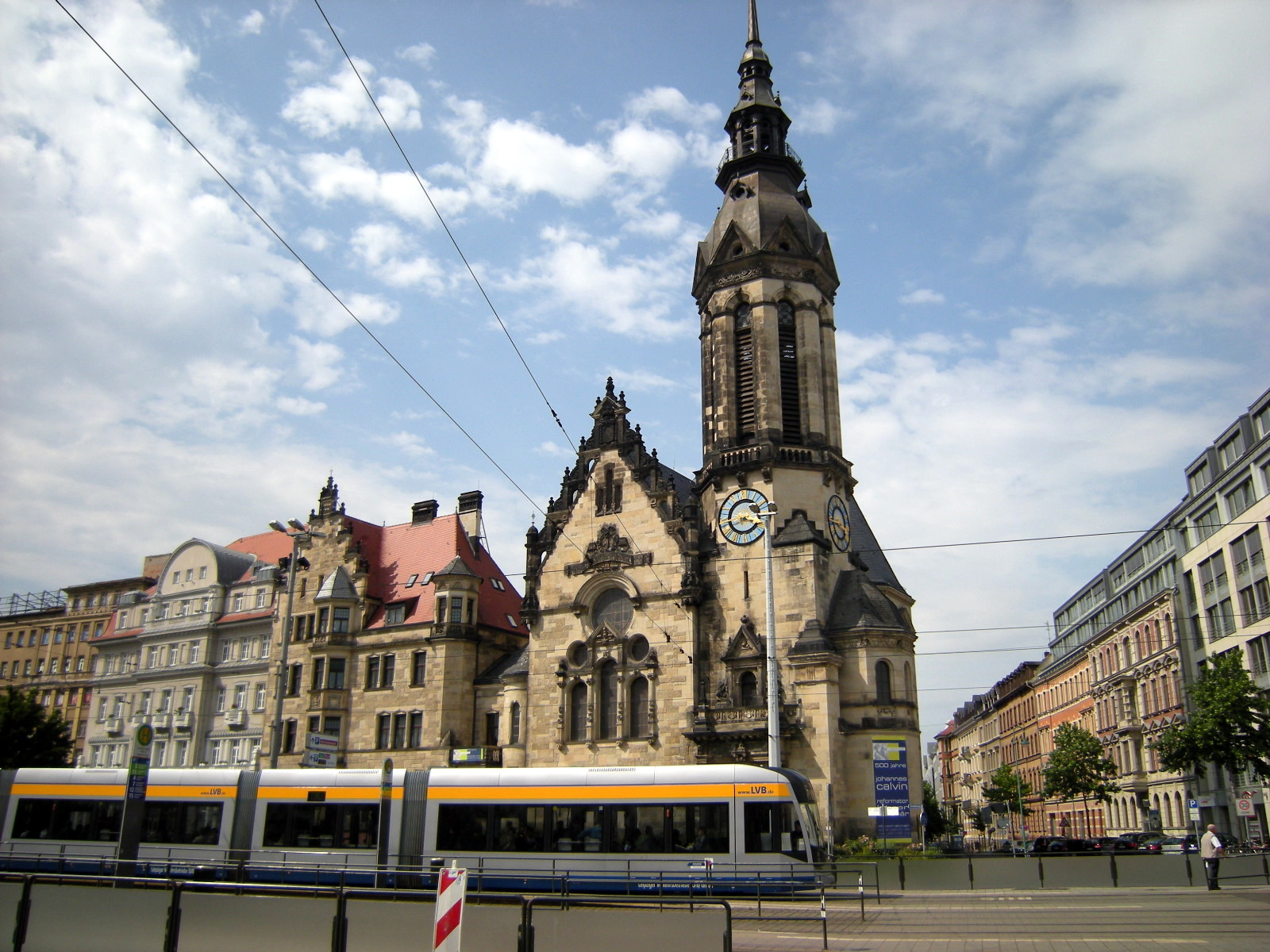
Continental Reformed church of Leipzig

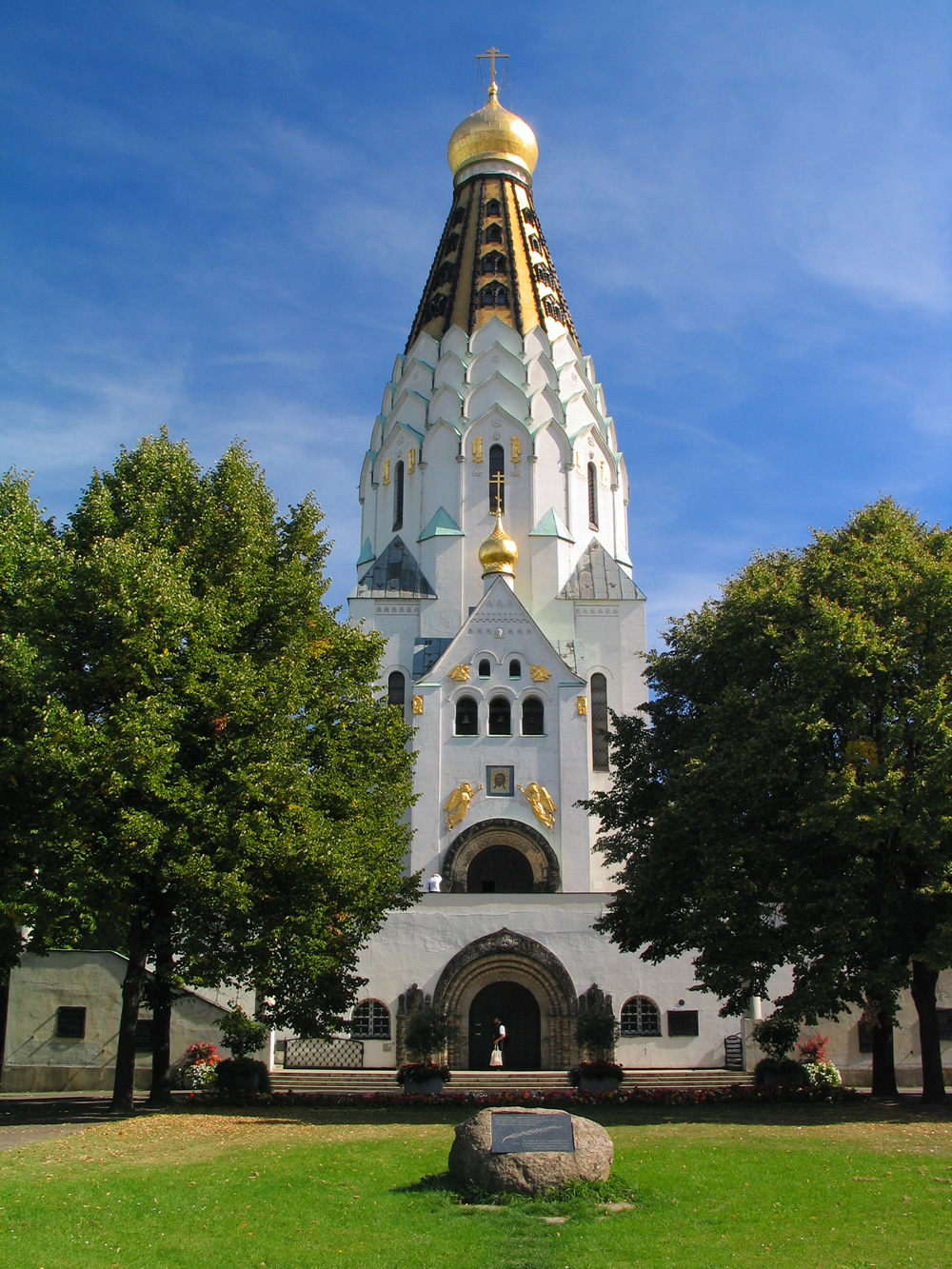
Russian Church of Leipzig

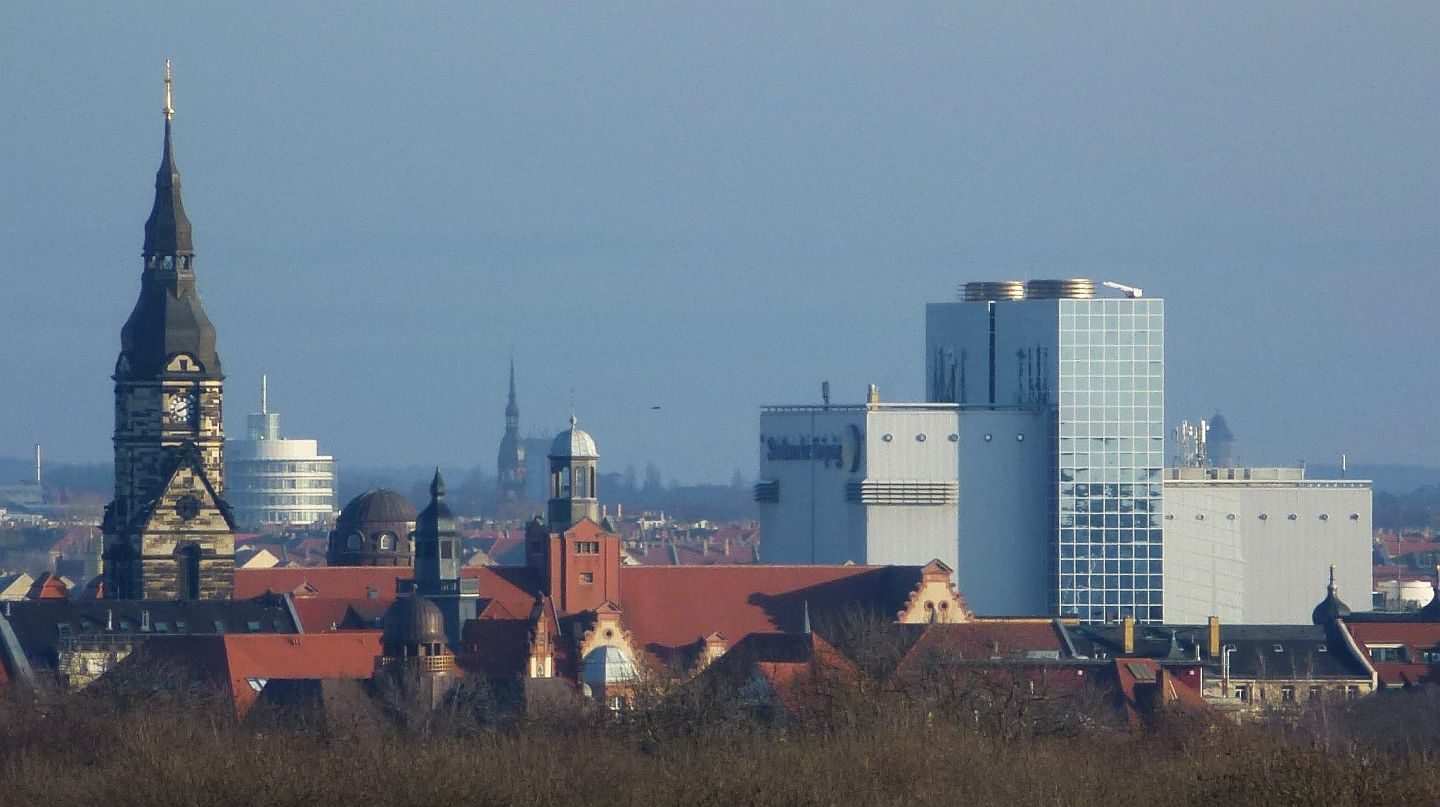
St. Michael's Church with the headquarters of Stadtwerke Leipzig to the right

=== Parks and lakes ===
Leipzig is well known for its large parks. The Leipziger Auwald (riparian forest) lies mostly within the city limits. Neuseenland is an area south of Leipzig where old open-cast mines are being converted into a huge lake district. It is planned to be finished in 2060.

- Leipzig Botanical Garden is the oldest of its kind in Germany. It contains a total of some 7,000 plant species, of which nearly 3,000 species comprise ten special collections.
- Johannapark and Clara-Zetkin-Park are the most prominent parks in the Leipzig city centre (Leipzig-Mitte).
- Leipziger Auwald covers a total area of approx. 2,500 hectares. The Rosental is a park in the north of the forest and borders Leipzig Zoo.
- The Leipzig Wildlife Park in Connewitz, showing 25 species.
- The Lene Voigt Park on the refurbished site of the former train station Leipzig Eilenburger Bahnhof opened in 2004.
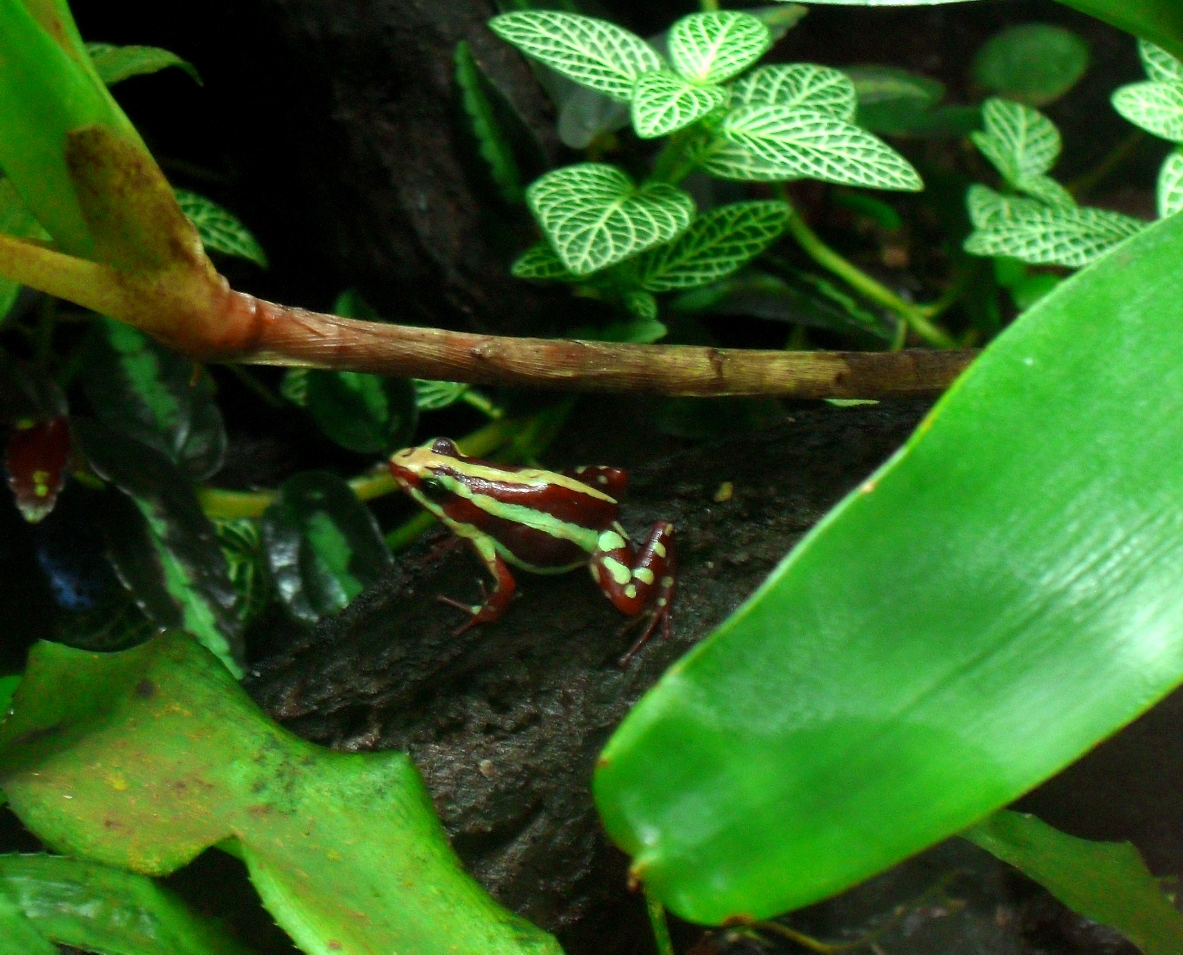
Inside Leipzig Botanical Garden

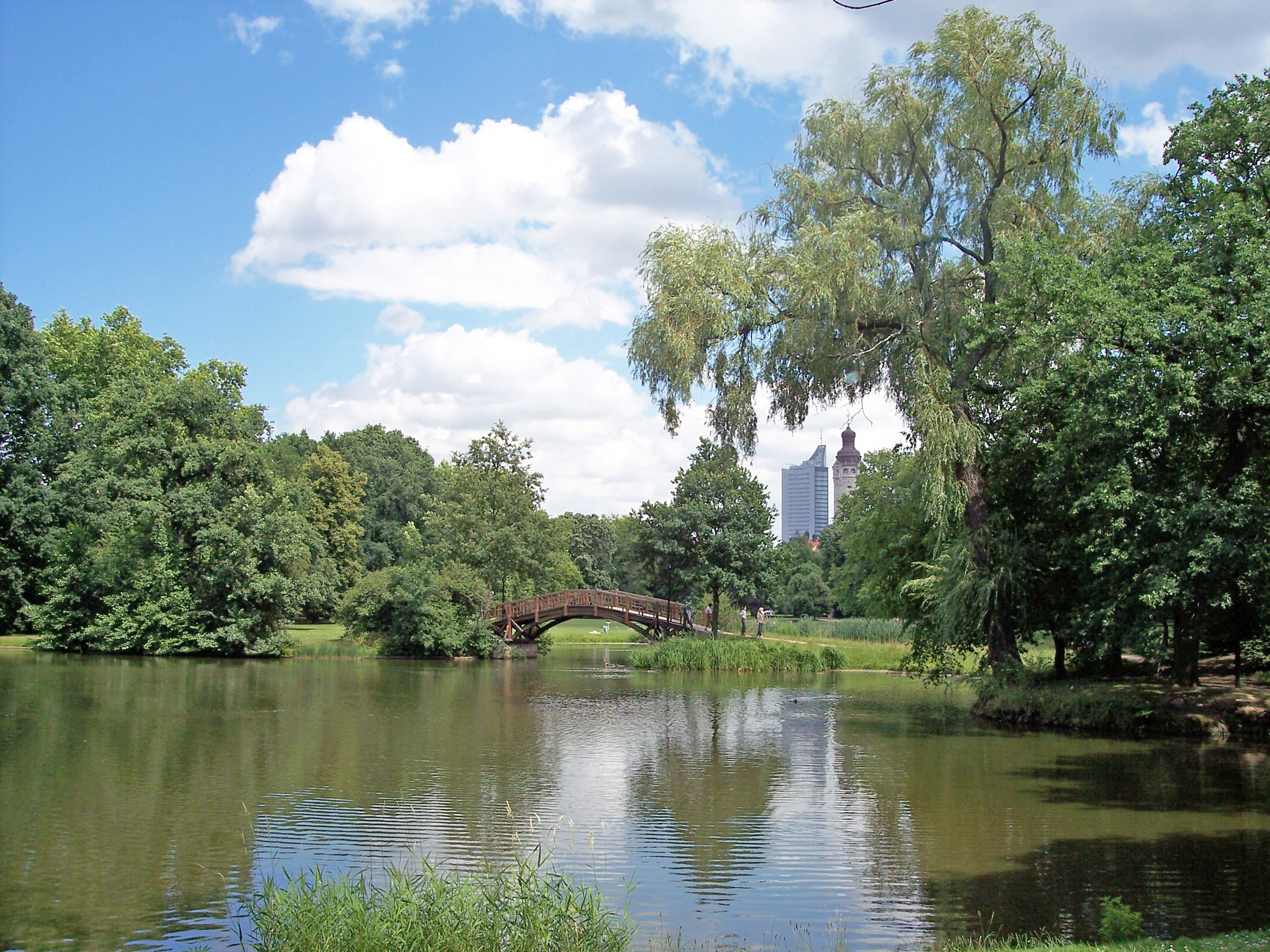
Johannapark

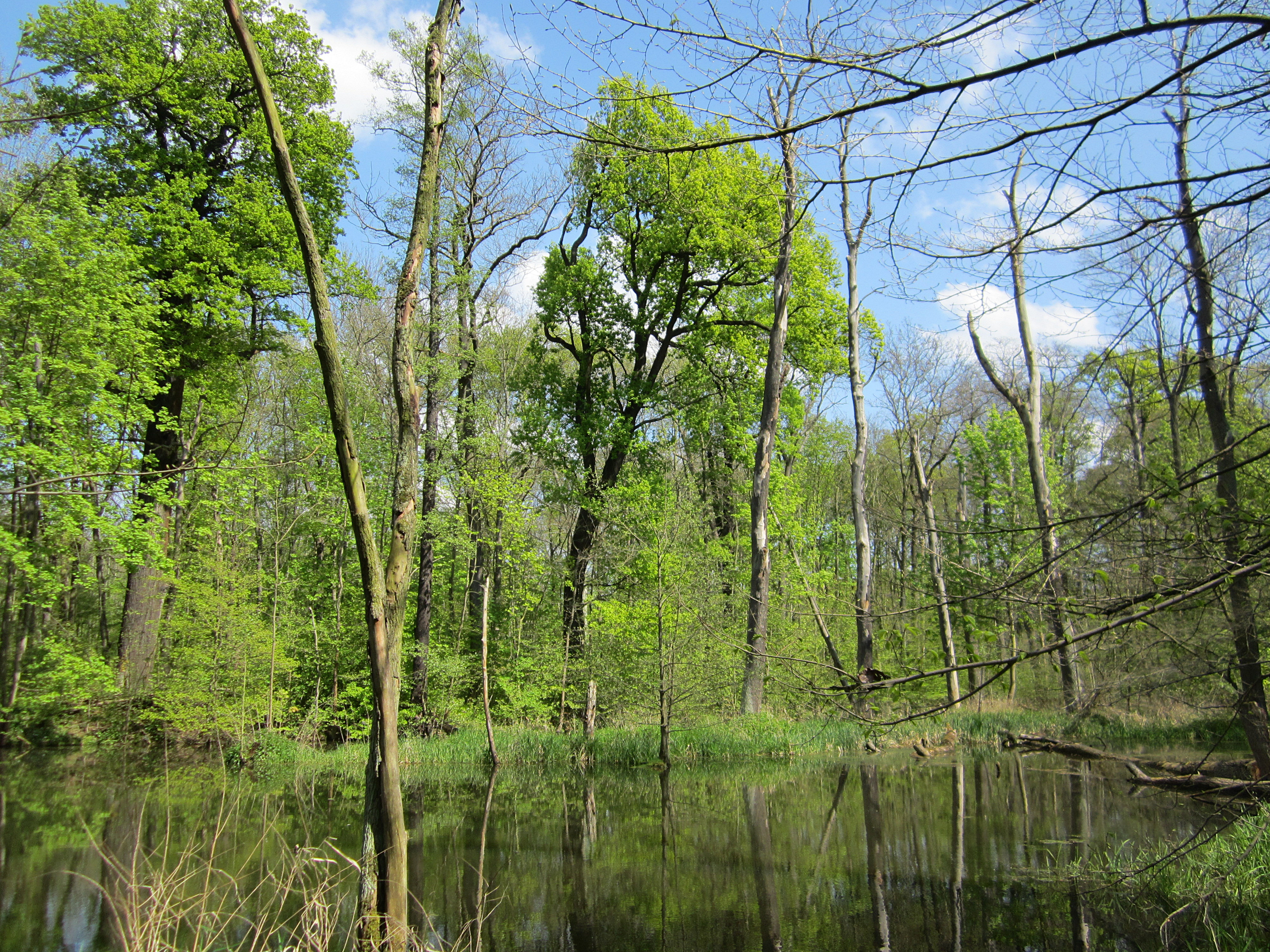
Leipziger Auwald

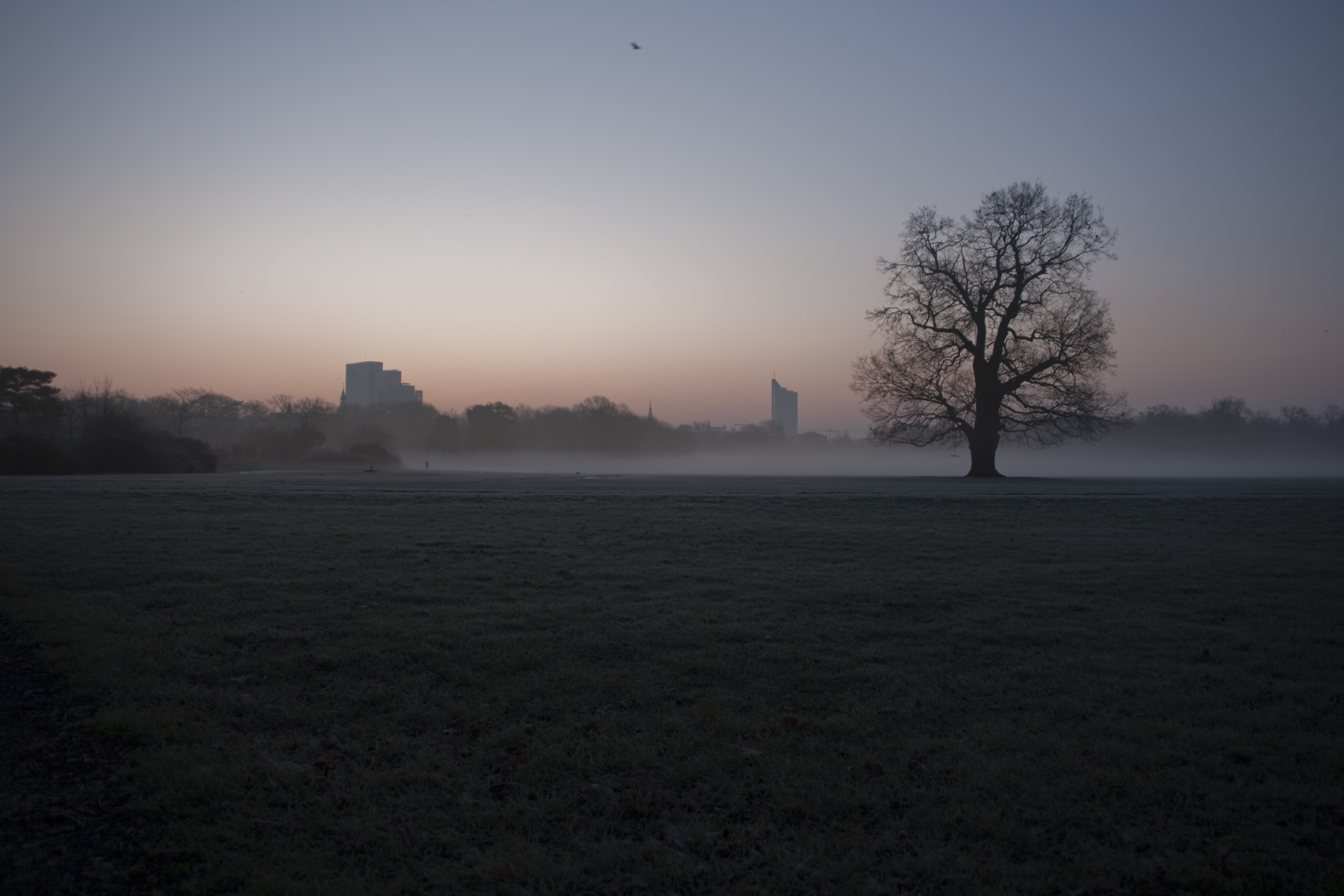
Rosental in the morning

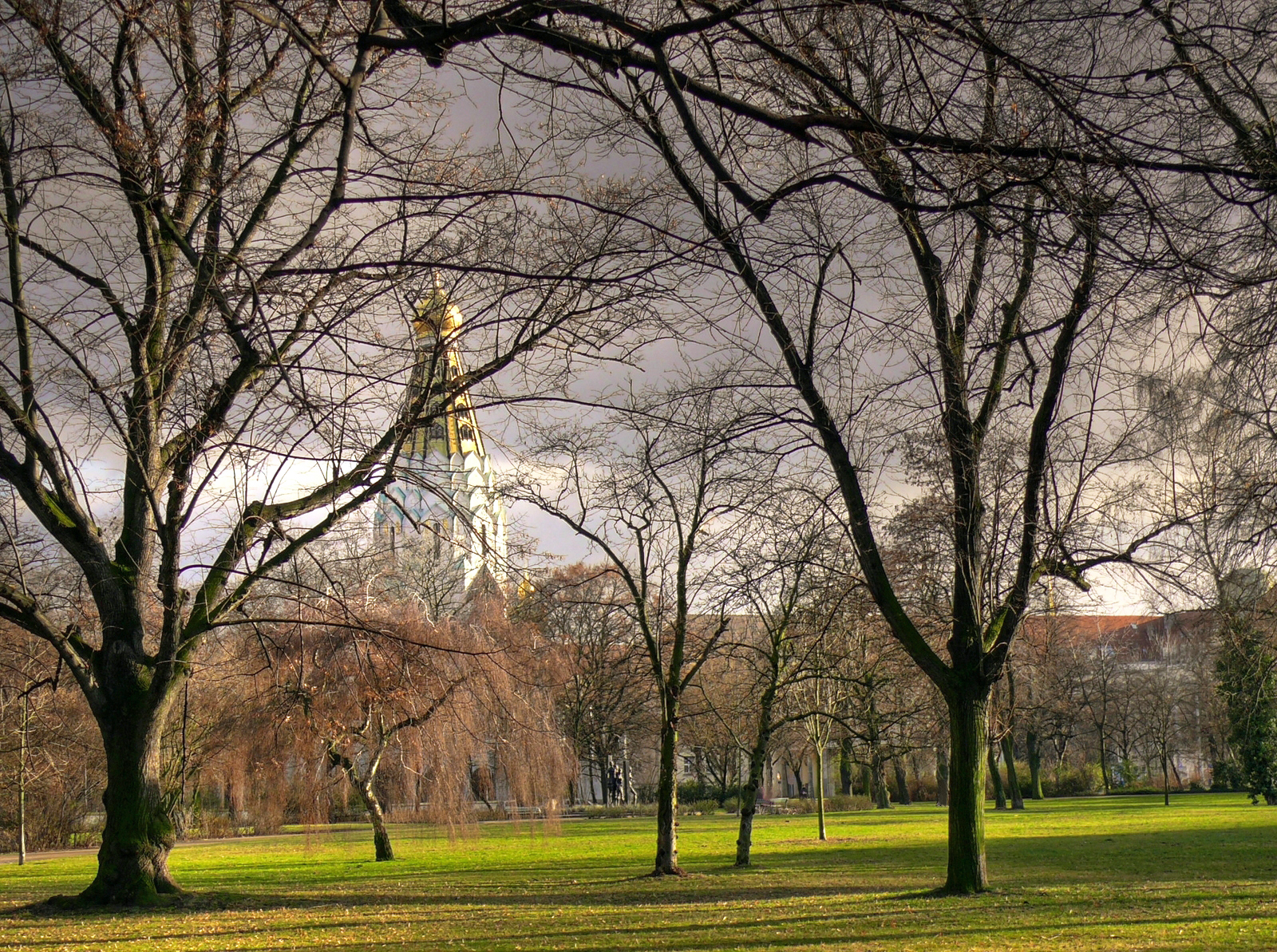
Friedenspark

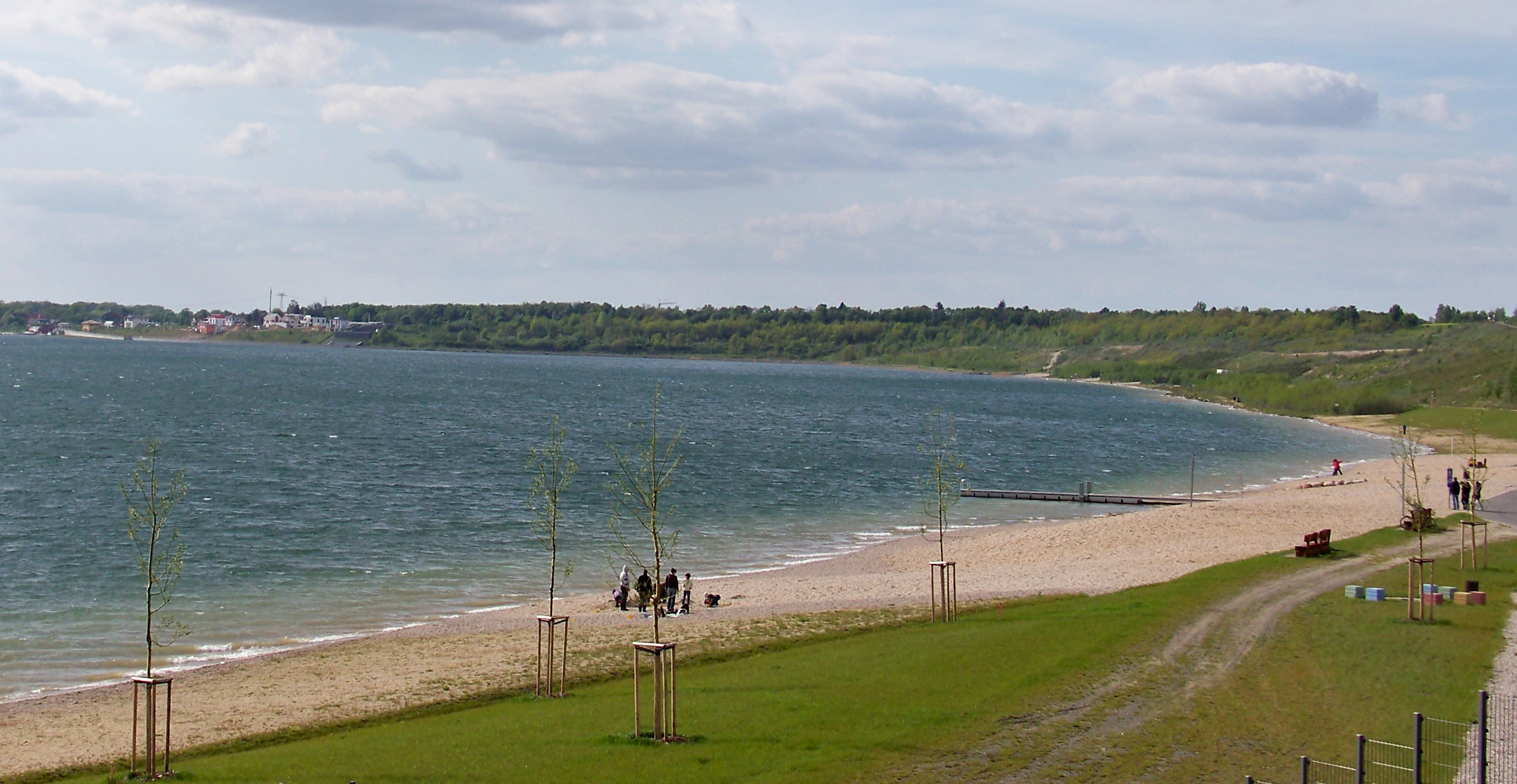
Markkleeberger See

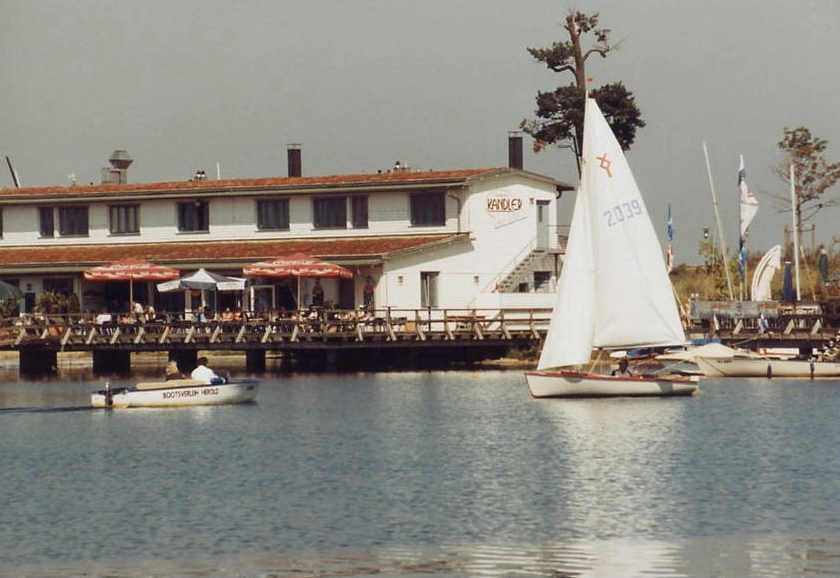
Cospudener See

=== Music ===
==== Baroque to Modern ====
Johann Sebastian Bach spent the longest phase of his career in Leipzig, from 1723 until his death in 1750, conducting the Thomanerchor (St. Thomas Church Choir), at the St. Thomas Church, the St. Nicholas Church, and the Paulinerkirche, the university church of Leipzig (destroyed in 1968). The composer Richard Wagner was born in Leipzig in 1813, in the Brühl. Robert Schumann was also active in Leipzig music, having been invited by Felix Mendelssohn when the latter established Germany's first musical conservatoire in the city in 1843. Gustav Mahler was second conductor (working under Artur Nikisch) at the Leipzig Opera from June 1886 until May 1888, and achieved his first significant recognition while there by completing and publishing Carl Maria von Weber's opera Die Drei Pintos. Mahler also completed his own 1st Symphony while living in Leipzig.

Today the conservatory is the University of Music and Theatre Leipzig. A broad range of subjects are taught, including artistic and teacher training in all orchestral instruments, voice, interpretation, coaching, piano chamber music, orchestral conducting, choir conducting, and musical composition in various musical styles. The drama departments teach acting and scriptwriting.

The Bach-Archiv Leipzig, an institution for the documentation and research of the life and work of Bach (and also of the Bach family), was founded in Leipzig in 1950 by Werner Neumann. The Bach-Archiv organizes the prestigious International Johann Sebastian Bach Competition, initiated in 1950 as part of a music festival marking the bicentennial of Bach's death. The competition is now held every two years in three changing categories. The Bach-Archiv also organizes performances, especially the international festival Bachfest Leipzig and runs the Leipzig Bach Museum.

The city's musical tradition is also reflected in the worldwide fame of the Leipzig Gewandhaus Orchestra, under its chief conductor Andris Nelsons, and the Thomanerchor.

The MDR Leipzig Radio Symphony Orchestra is Leipzig's second largest symphony orchestra. Its current chief conductor is Kristjan Järvi. Both the Gewandhausorchester and the MDR Leipzig Radio Symphony Orchestra make use of in the Gewandhaus concert hall.

For over sixty years Leipzig has been offering a "school concert" programme for children in Germany, with over 140 concerts every year in venues such as the Gewandhaus and over 40,000 children attending.

==== Contemporary ====
Leipzig is known for its independent music scene and subcultural events. Leipzig has for thirty years been home to the Wave-Gotik-Treffen (WGT), which is currently the world's largest Gothic festival, where thousands of fans of goth music gather in the early summer. The first Wave Gotik Treffen was held at the Eiskeller club, today known as Conne Island, in the Connewitz district. Mayhem's notorious album Live in Leipzig was also recorded at the Eiskeller club.

Leipzig Pop Up was an annual music trade fair for the independent music scene as well as a music festival taking place on Pentecost weekend. Its most famous indie-labels are Moon Harbour Recordings (House) and Kann Records (House/Techno/Psychedelic). Several venues offer live music frequently, including the Moritzbastei, Tonelli's, and Noch Besser Leben.

Die Prinzen ("The Princes") is a German band founded in Leipzig. With almost six million records sold, they are one of the most successful German bands.

The cover photo for the Beirut band's 2005 album Gulag Orkestar, according to the sleeve notes, was stolen from a Leipzig library by Zach Condon.

The city of Leipzig is also the birthplace of Till Lindemann, best known as the lead vocalist of Rammstein and Bill Kaulitz and Tom Kaulitz, best known as the main members of Tokio Hotel.

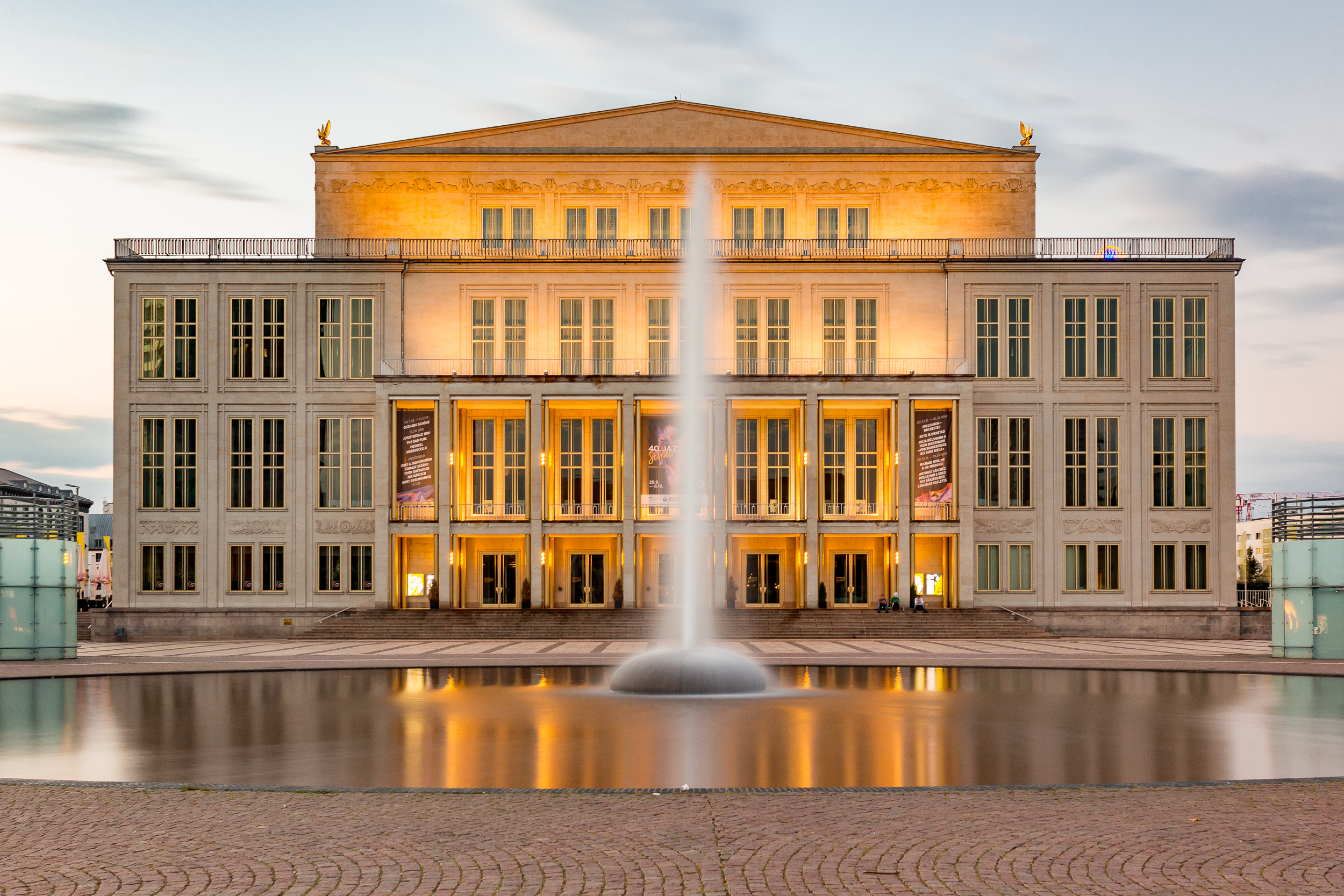
Leipzig Opera

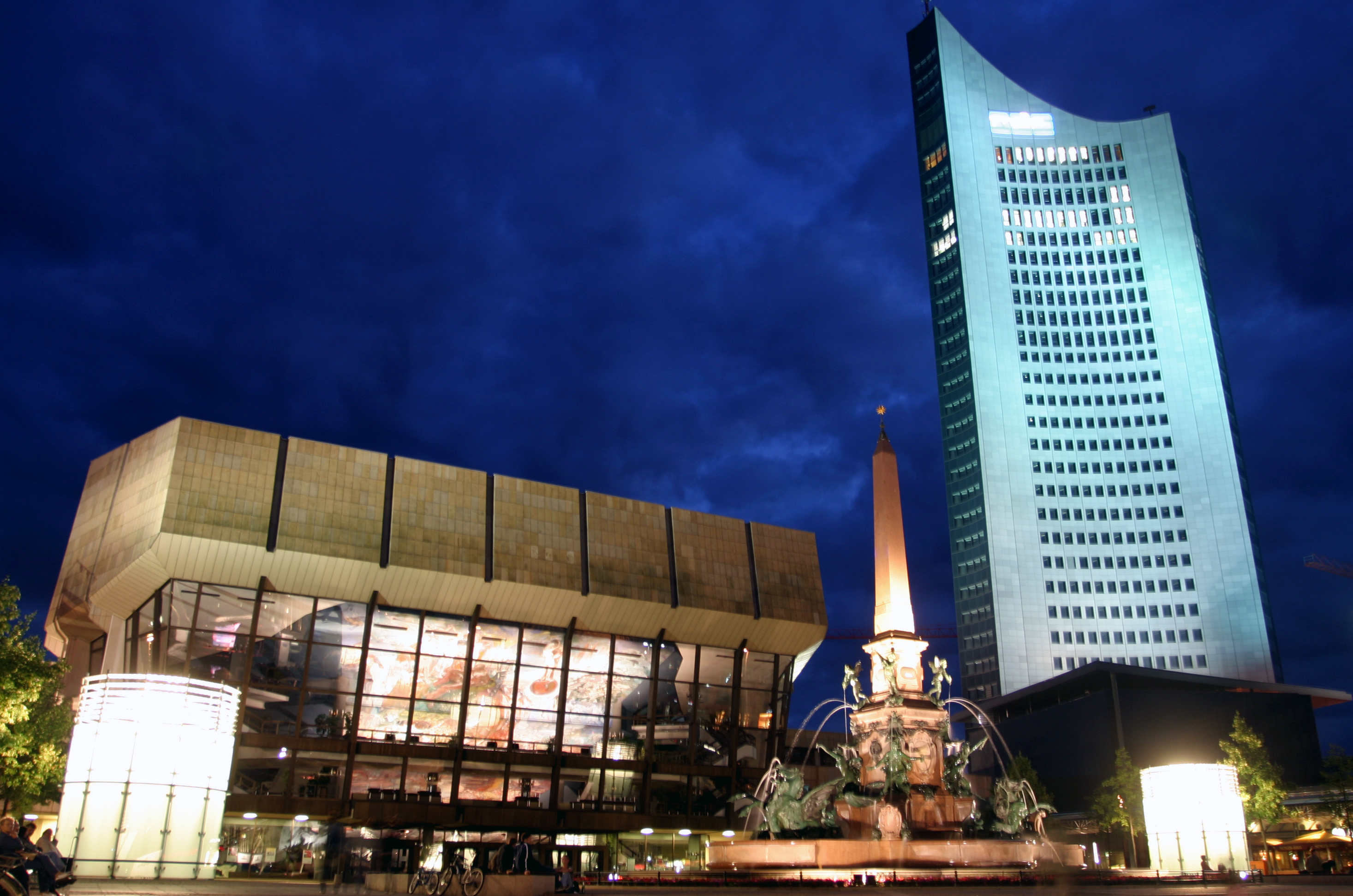
View over Augustusplatz with the Gewandhaus

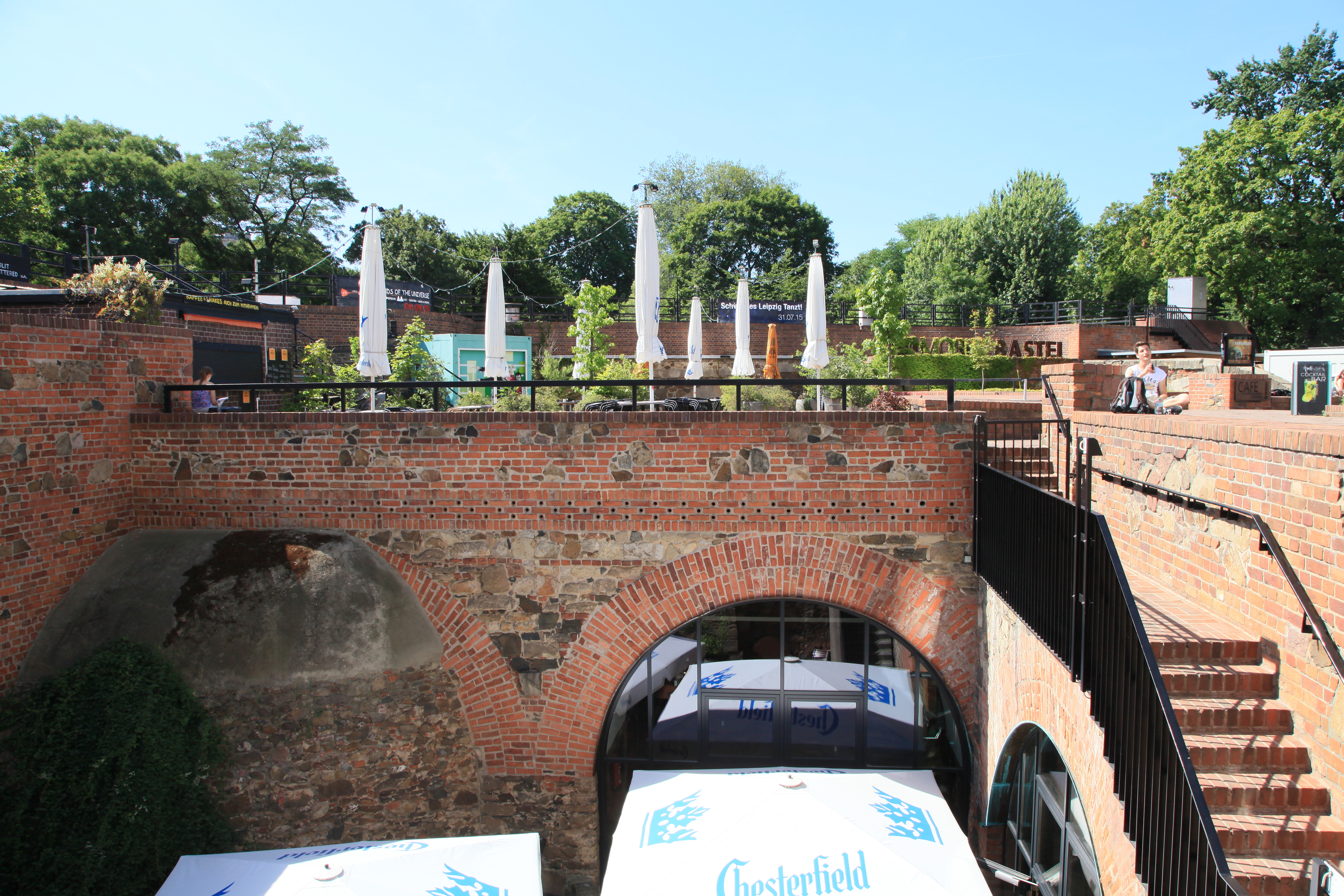
Moritzbastei is the largest student club in Germany and is famous for its atmosphere and large number of cultural and music events.

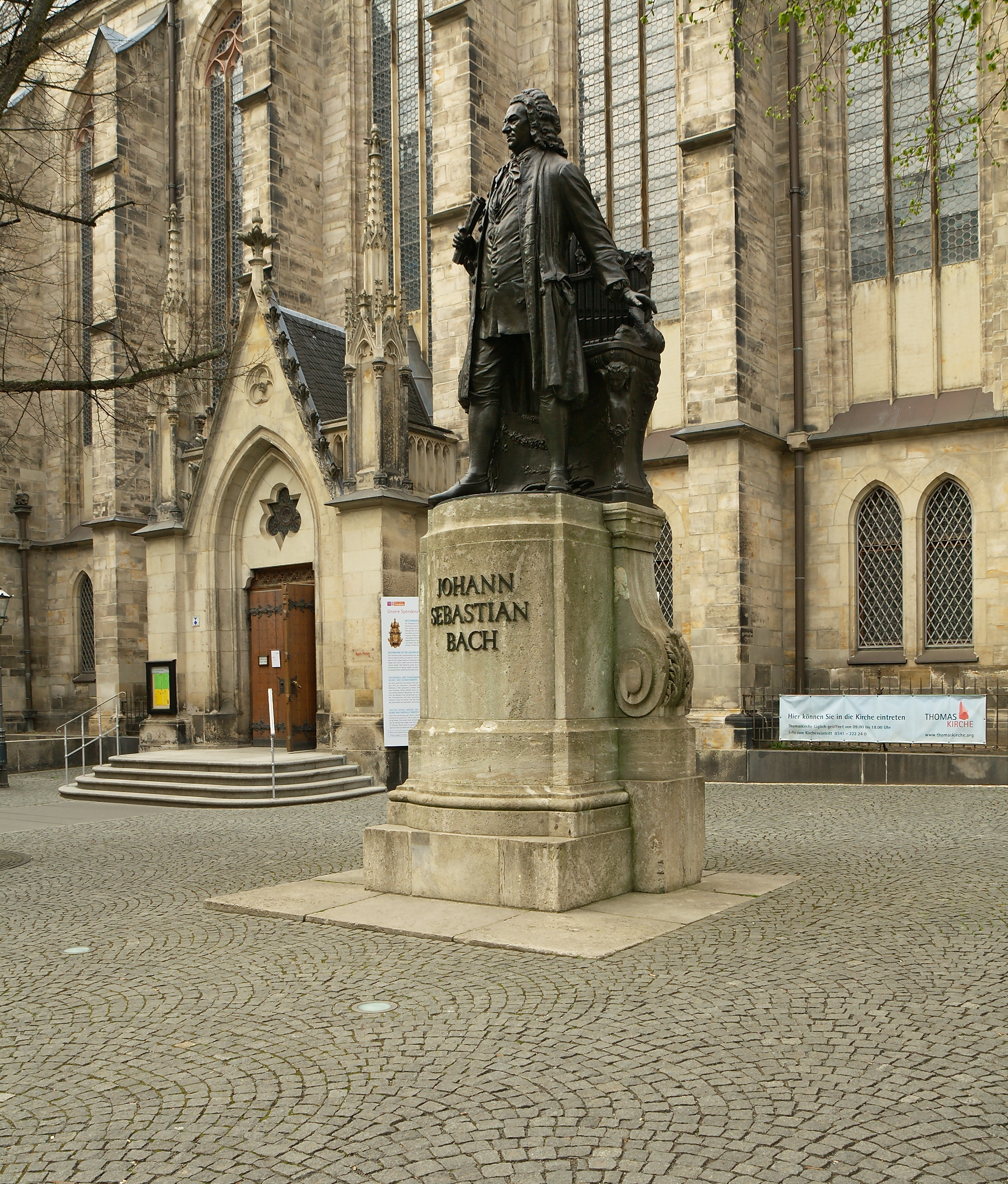
Monument of Johann Sebastian Bach

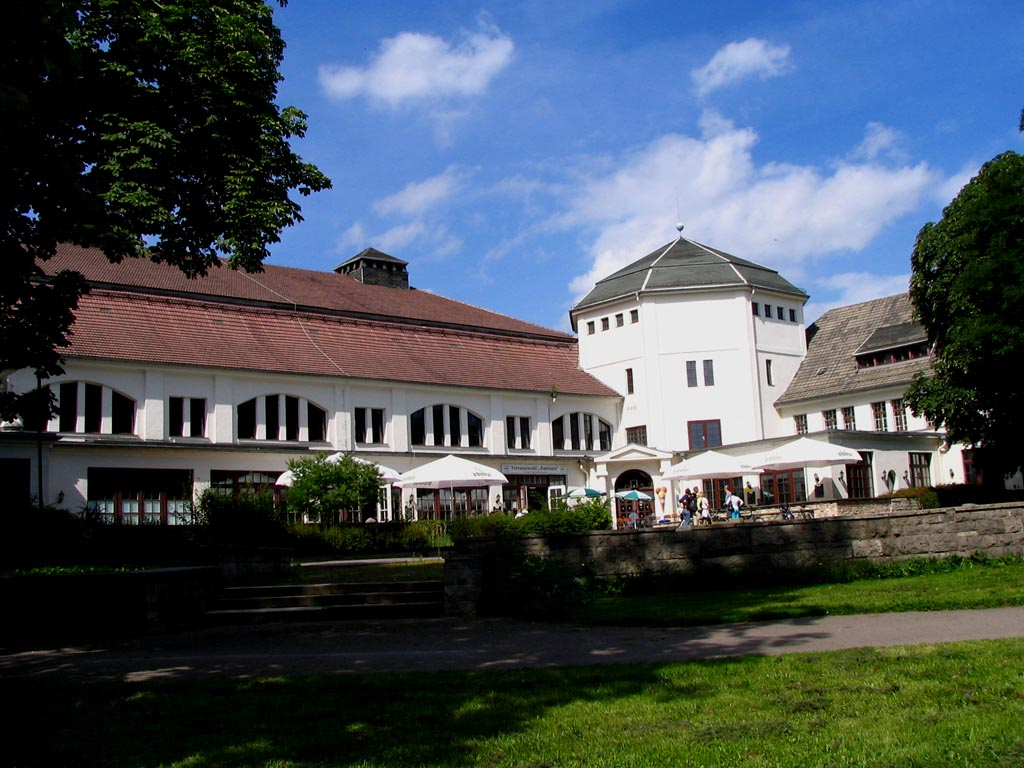
Haus Auensee, a concert hall

=== Annual events ===
- Auto Mobil International (AMI) motor show
- AMITEC, trade fair for vehicle maintenance, care, servicing, and repairs in Germany and Central Europe
- A cappella: vocal music festival, organized by the ensemble amarcord
- Bachfest: Johann Sebastian Bach festival
- Leipzig Christmas Market (since 1458)
- Dok Leipzig: international festival for documentary and animated film
- Jazztage, contemporary jazz festival
- Ladyfest Leipzig (August) Emancipatoric, feminist punk and electro festival
- Leipzig Book Fair: the second largest German book fair after Frankfurt
- Lichtfest Leipzig, festival celebrating the demonstrations leading up to the collapse of the East German regime
- OPER unplugged with Music Dance Theatre by Heike Hennig & Co
- Stadtfest: city festival
- Wave-Gotik-Treffen at Pentecost: world's largest goth or "dark culture" festival
- Leipzig Pop Up
- Chaos Communication Congress
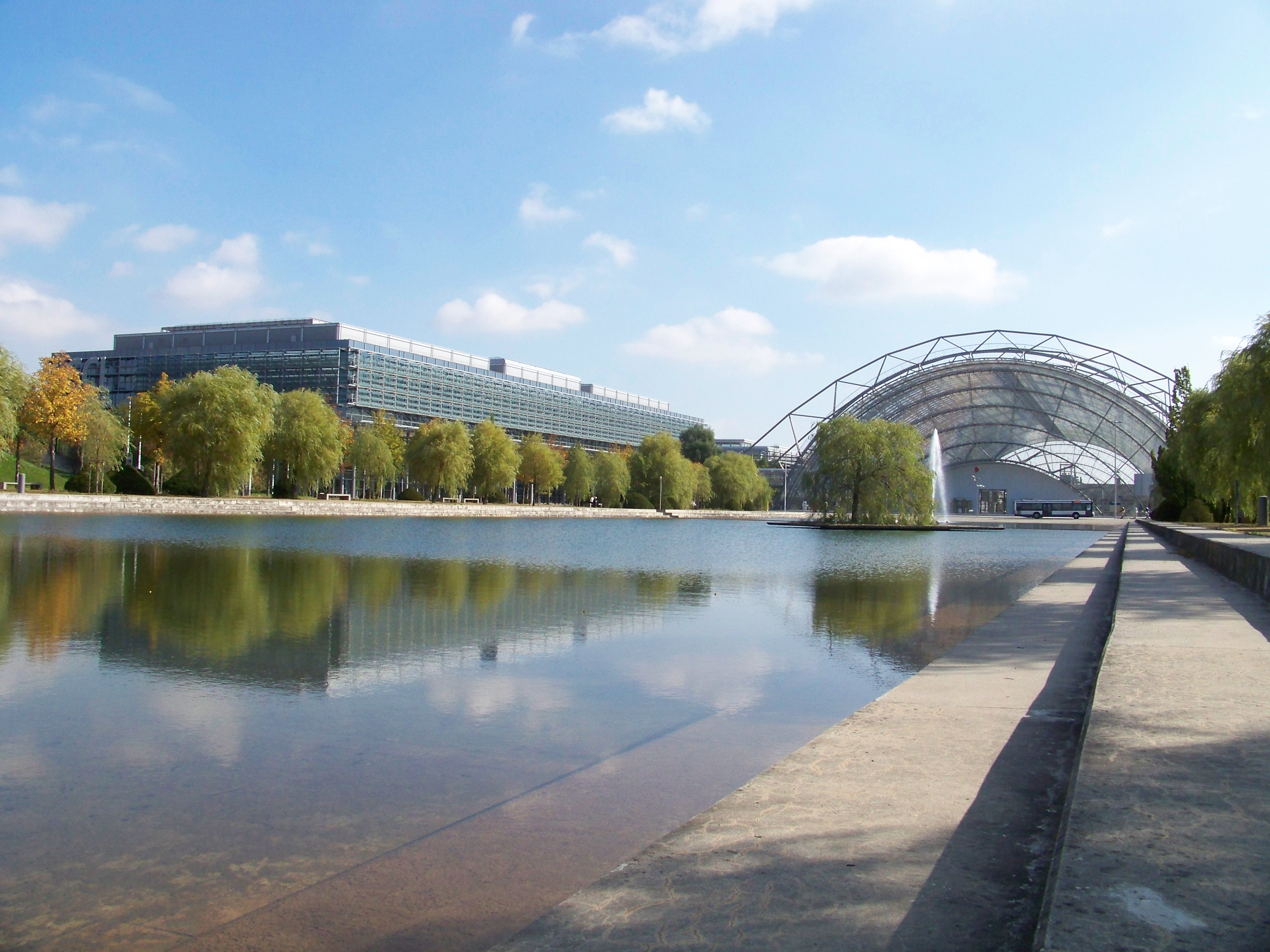
Leipzig Trade Fair

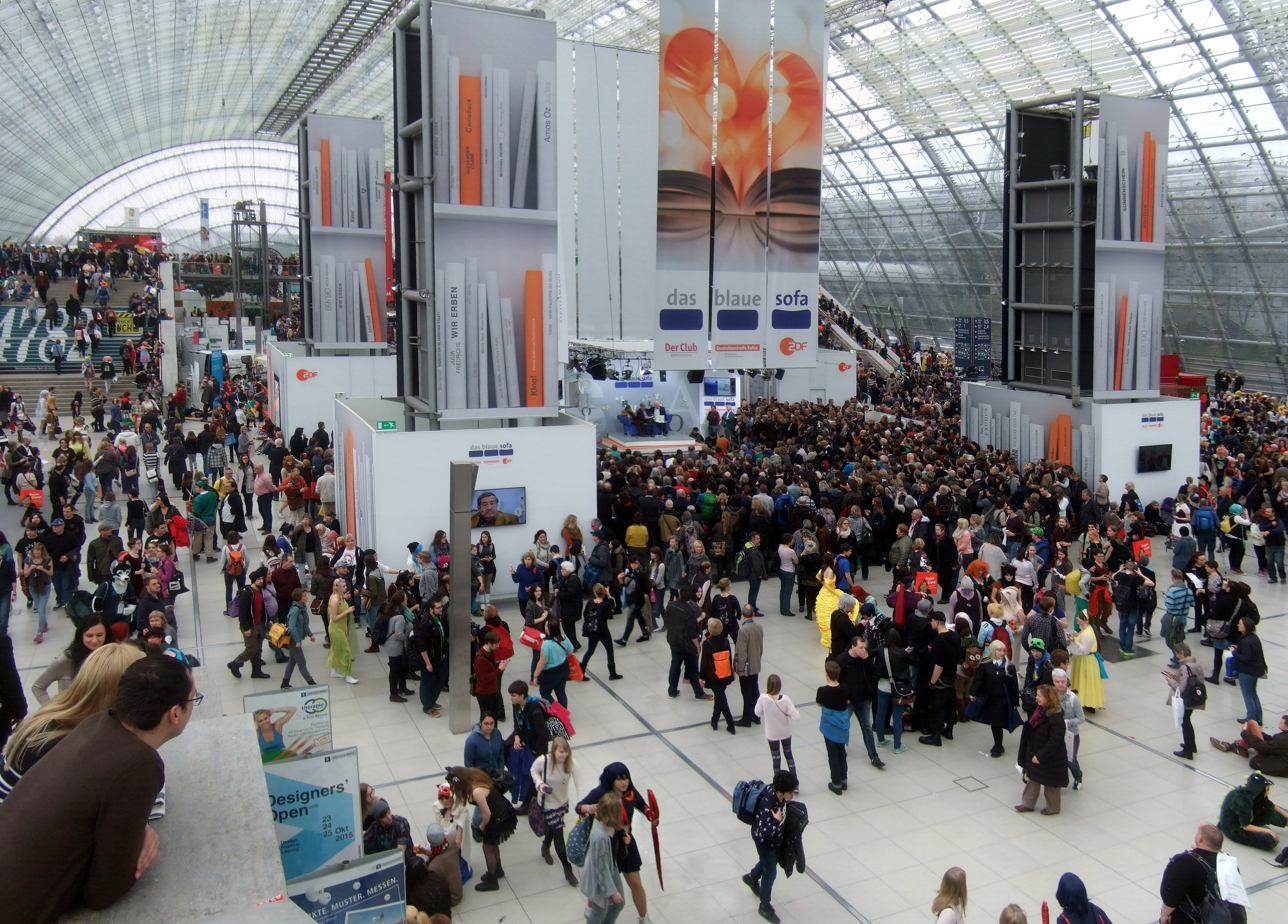
Leipzig Book Fair 2015

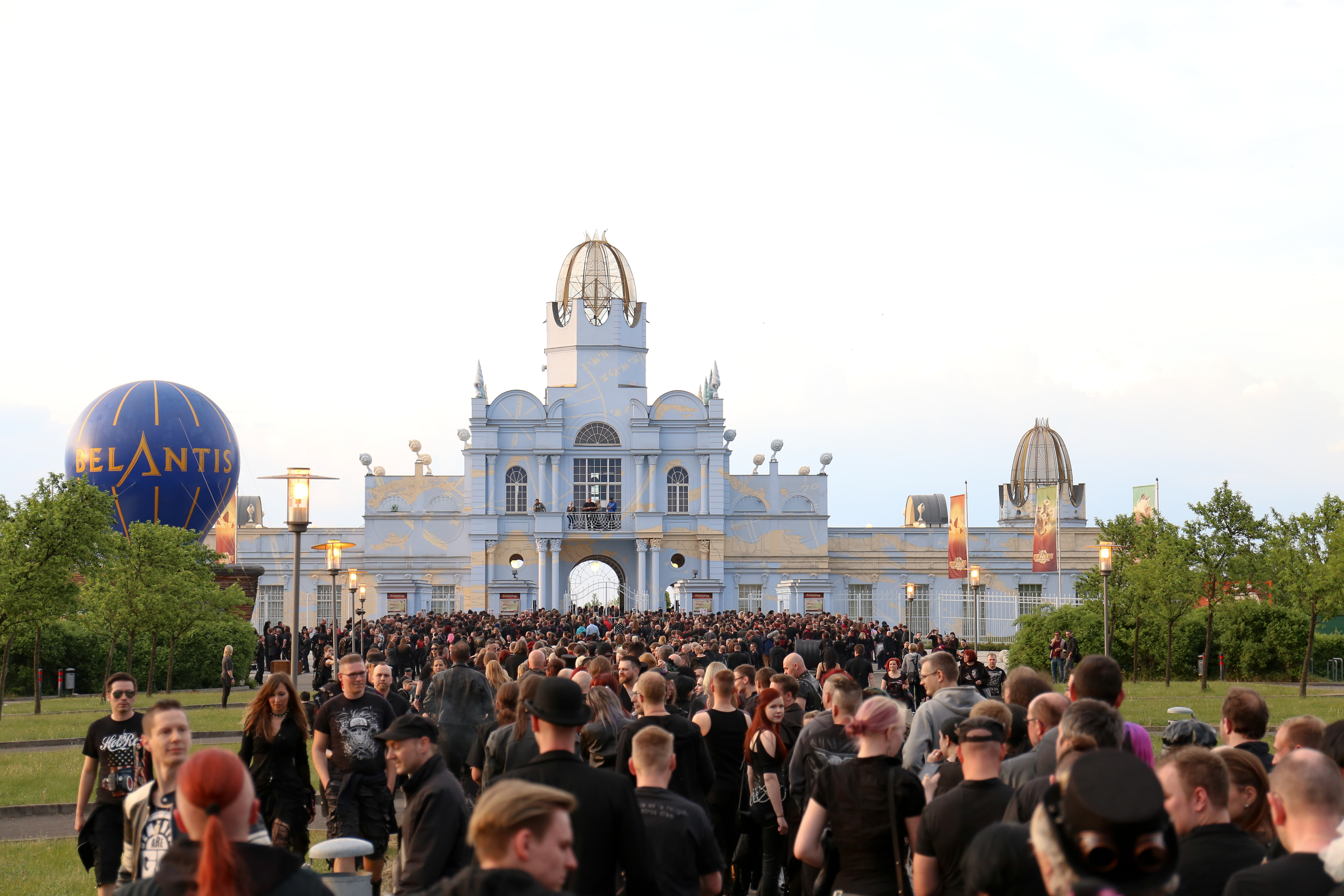
Wave-Gotik-Treffen 2016; Belantis park in the background

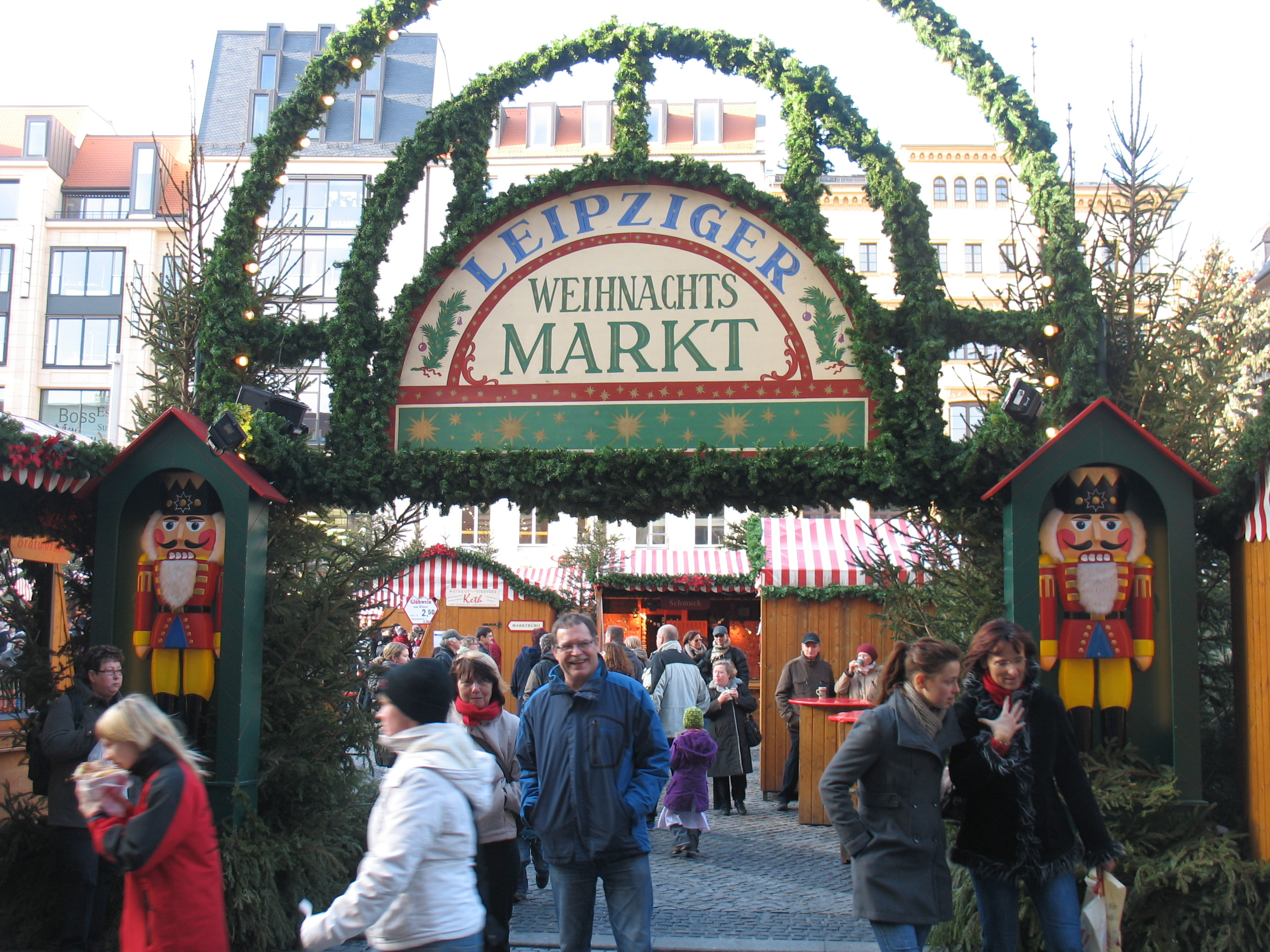
Leipzig Christmas market entrance

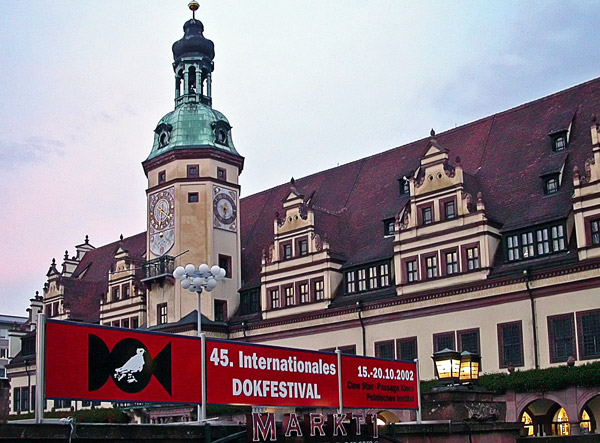
DOK Leipzig

=== Food and drink ===
- An all-season local dish is Leipziger Allerlei, a stew consisting of seasonal vegetables and crayfish.
- Leipziger Lerche is a shortcrust pastry dish filled with crushed almonds, nuts, and strawberry jam; the name ("Leipzig lark") comes from a lark pâté which was a Leipzig specialty until the banning of songbird hunting in Saxony in 1876.
- Gose is a locally brewed top-fermenting sour beer that originated in the Goslar region and became popular in 18th-century Leipzig.
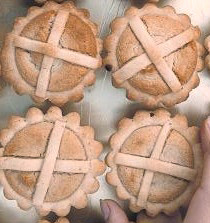
Leipziger Lerchen

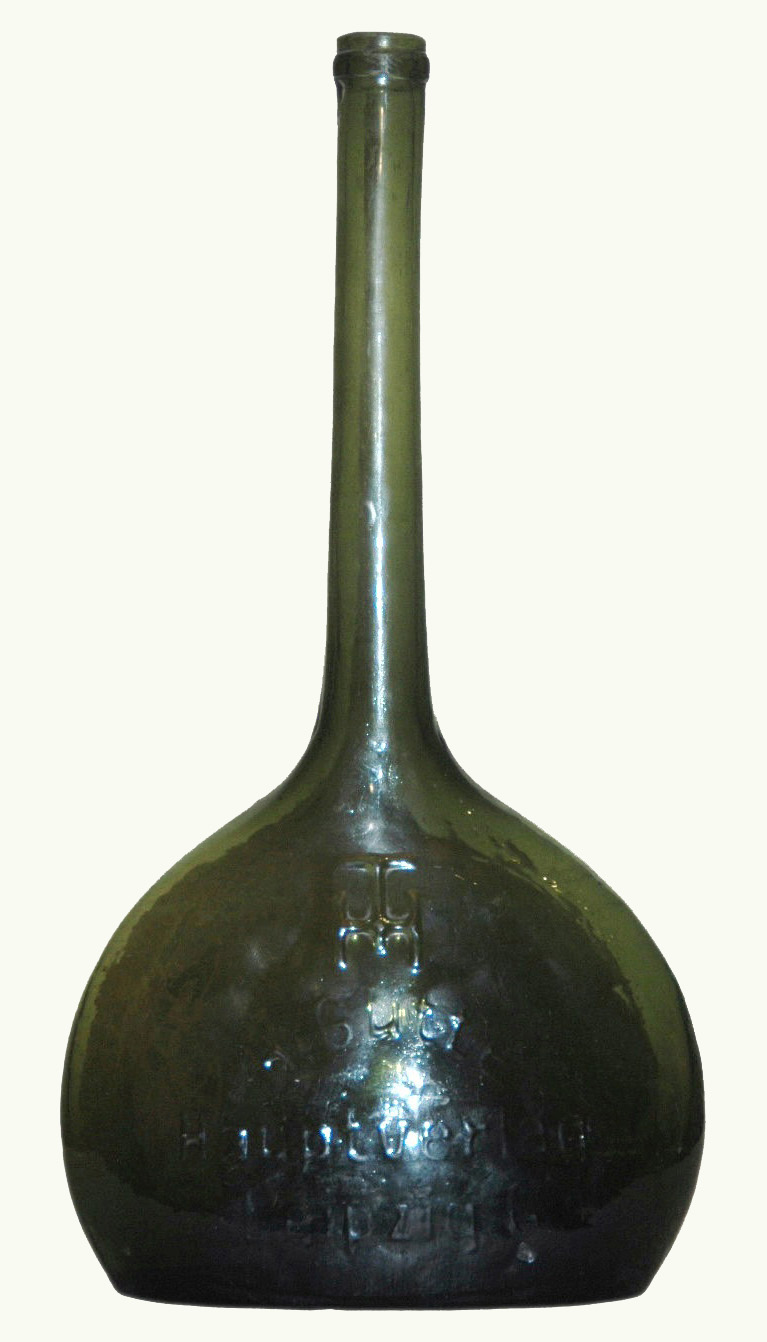
Historical Gose bottle (c. 1900)

== Sports ==
There are more than 300 sport clubs in the city, representing 78 different disciplines. Over 400 athletic facilities are available to citizens and club members.

=== Football ===
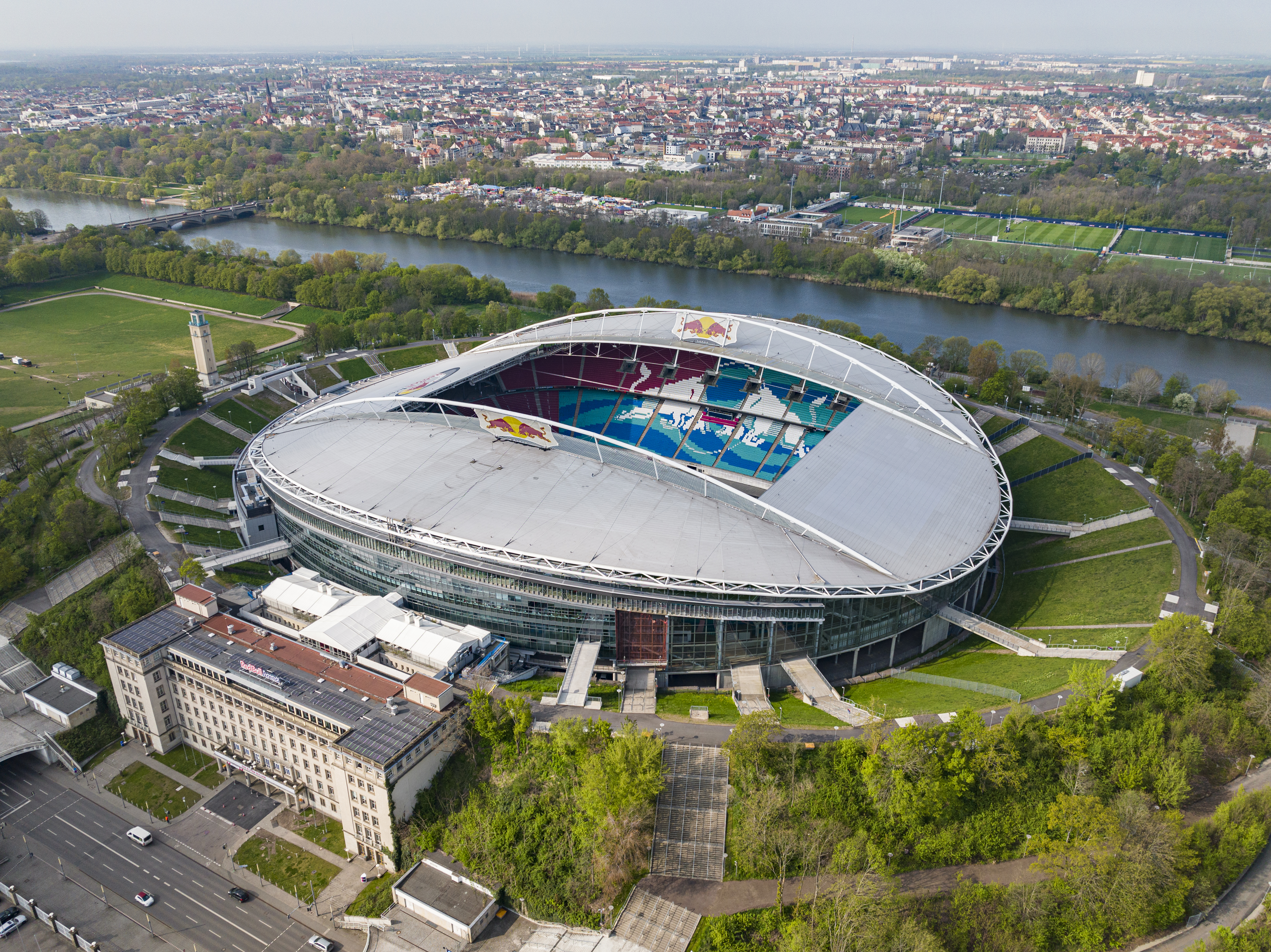
The Red Bull Arena from above. Home of RB Leipzig.

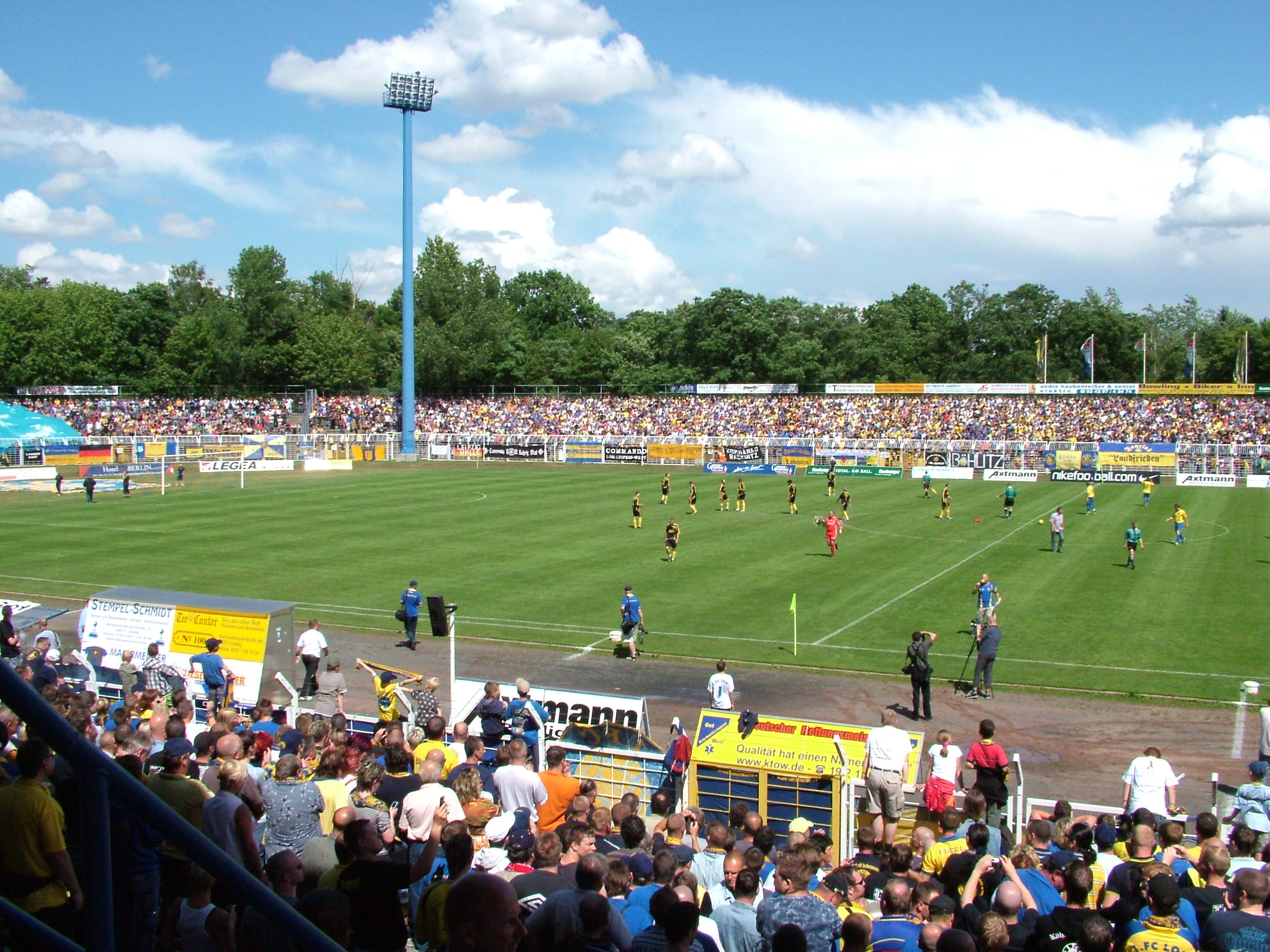
Bruno-Plache-Stadion is the home stadion of 1. FC Lokomotive Leipzig.

The German Football Association (DFB) was founded in Leipzig in 1900. The city was the venue for the 2006 FIFA World Cup draw, and hosted four first-round matches and one match in the round of 16 in the central stadium.

VfB Leipzig won the first national Association football championship in 1903. The club was dissolved in 1946 and the remains reformed as SG Probstheida. The club was eventually reorganized as football club 1. FC Lokomotive Leipzig in 1966. 1. FC Lokomotive Leipzig has had a glorious past in international competition as well, having been champions of the 1965–66 Intertoto Cup, semi-finalists in the 1973–74 UEFA Cup, and runners-up in the 1986–87 European Cup Winners' Cup.

The current Chemie Leipzig from the Leutzsch district, although legally founded in 1997 and started playing in 2008, can trace its roots to the 19th Century. The Chemie Leipzig founded in 1950 dates back to the prewar identity rooted in the establishment of Britannia Leipzig in 1899 and its successor TuRa Leipzig. During the socialist era, the traditions of the club were continued in the East German teams through a complicated history of mergers and name changes before the emergence of FC Sachsen Leipzig in 1990, following German reunification, which continued the clubs traditions.

Red Bull took over a local 5th division football club SSV Markranstädt in May 2009, having previously been denied the right to buy into FC Sachsen Leipzig in 2006. The club was renamed RB Leipzig and came up through the ranks of German football, winning promotion to the Bundesliga, the highest division of German football in 2016. The club finished runners-up in its first-ever Bundesliga season and made its debut in the UEFA Champions League in 2017 and the Semi-Final in 2020.

RB Leipzig won the DFB-Pokal football cup twice, in 2022 and 2023.

List of Leipzig men and women's football clubs playing at state level and above:

| Club | Founded | League | Level | Home ground | Capacity |
|---|---|---|---|---|---|
| RB Leipzig | 2009 | Bundesliga | 1 | Red Bull Arena | 47,069 |
| RB Leipzig (women) | 2016^{1} | 2. Frauen-Bundesliga | 2 | Sportanlage Gontardweg | 1,300 |
| 1. FC Lokomotive Leipzig | 2003 | Regionalliga Nordost | 4 | Bruno-Plache-Stadion | 7,000 |
| BSG Chemie Leipzig | 1997^{2} | Regionalliga Nordost | 4 | Alfred-Kunze-Sportpark | 4,999 |
| FC International Leipzig | 2013 | NOFV-Oberliga Süd | 5 | Sportpark Tresenwald | 1,500 |
| Roter Stern Leipzig | 1999 | Landesklasse Sachsen Nord | 7 | Sportpark Dölitz | 1,200 |

Note 1: The RB Leipzig women's football team was formed in 2016 and began play in the 2016–17 season.
Note 2: The club began play in the 2008–09 season.

=== Ice hockey ===
Since the beginning of the 20th century, ice hockey has gained popularity, and several local clubs established departments dedicated to that sport.

=== Handball ===
SC DHfK Leipzig is the men's handball club in Leipzig and were six times (1959, 1960, 1961, 1962, 1965, and 1966) the champion of East Germany handball league and was winner of EHF Champions League in 1966. They finally promoted to Handball-Bundesliga as champions of 2. Bundesliga in 2014–15 season. They play in the Arena Leipzig which has a capacity of 6,327 spectators in HBL games but can take up to 7,532 spectators for handball in maximum capacity.

Handball-Club Leipzig is one of the most successful women's handball clubs in Germany, winning 21 domestic championships since 1953 and 2 Champions League titles. The team was however relegated to the third tier league in 2017 due to failing to achieve the economic standard demanded by the league licence.

=== American football ===
The Leipzig Kings were an American football team playing in the European League of Football (ELF), which is a professional league, that became the first fully professional league in Europe since the demise of NFL Europe. The Kings began by playing games against teams from Germany, Spain, and Poland in June 2021. They played their home games at Alfred-Kunze-Sportpark.

=== Speedway ===
The Motodrom am Cottaweg is a motorcycle speedway stadium on the west side of the Neue Luppe, located on the Cottaweg road. The venue is used by the speedway club called Motorsport Club Post Leipzig e.V. and held the East German Speedway Championship in 1978 and a qualifying round of the Speedway World Team Cup in 1991.

=== Other sports ===
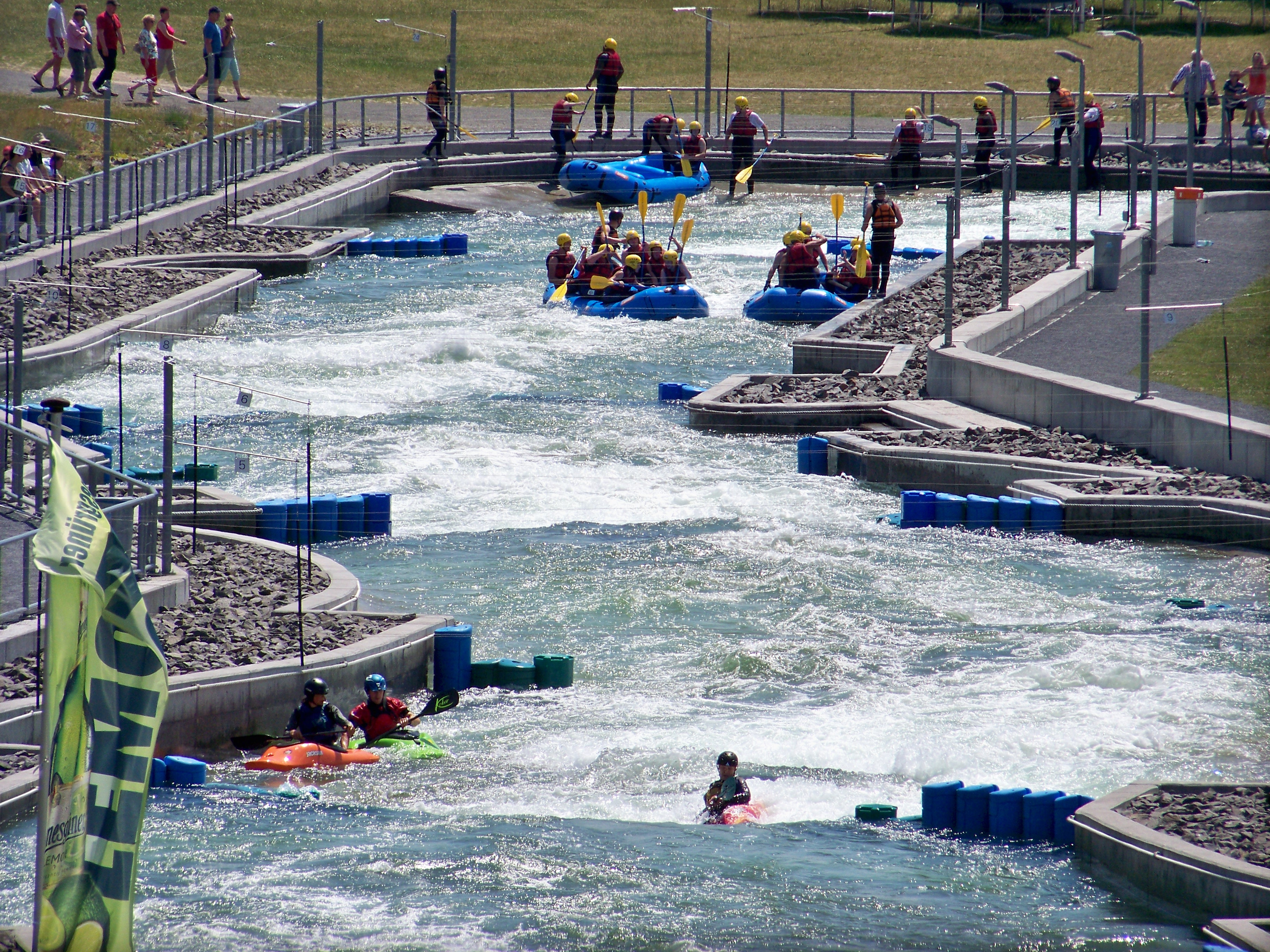
The artificial whitewater course Kanupark Markkleeberg at Markkleeberger See

From 1950 to 1990 Leipzig was host of the Deutsche Hochschule für Körperkultur (DHfK, German College of Physical Culture), the national sports college of the GDR.

Leipzig also hosted the Fencing World Cup in 2005 and hosts a number of international competitions in a variety of sports each year.

Leipzig made a bid to host the 2012 Summer Olympics. The bid did not make the shortlist after the International Olympic Committee pared the bids down to 5.

Markkleeberger See is a new lake next to Markkleeberg, a suburb on the south side of Leipzig. A former open-pit coal mine, it was flooded in 1999 with groundwater and developed in 2006 as a tourist area. On its southeastern shore is Germany's only pump-powered artificial whitewater slalom course, Markkleeberg Canoe Park (Kanupark Markkleeberg), a venue which rivals the Eiskanal in Augsburg for training and international canoe/kayak competition.

Leipzig Rugby Club competes in the German Rugby Bundesliga but finished at the bottom of their group in 2013.

Leipzig hosted the Indoor Hockey World Cup in 2015. All matches were played in Leipzig Arena, with the Netherlands coming out victorious in both the men's and women's tournaments.

On 1 May every year, the opening of the horse racing season is celebrated in Leipzig's Racecourse Scheibenholz.

== Education ==
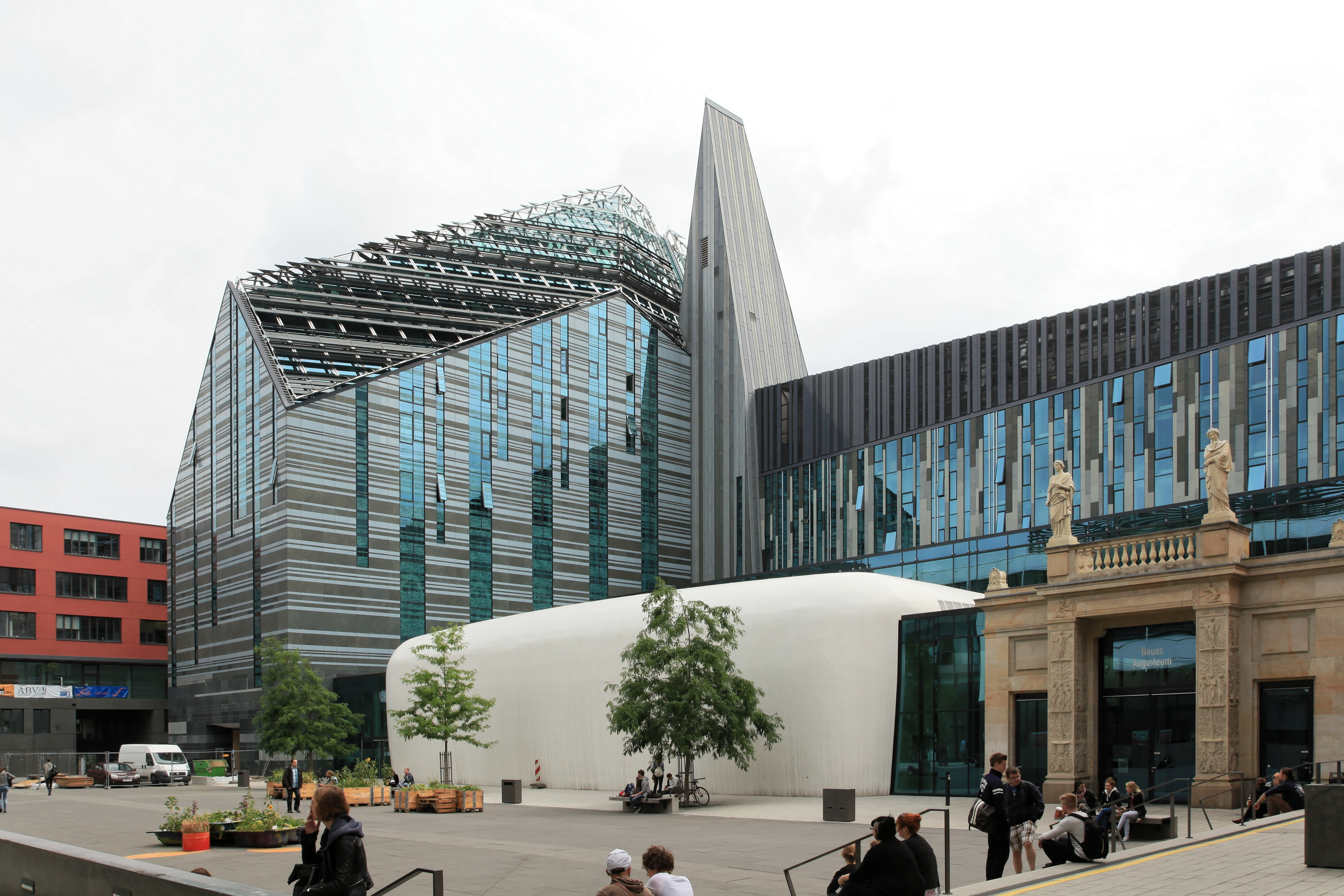
Campus of Leipzig University

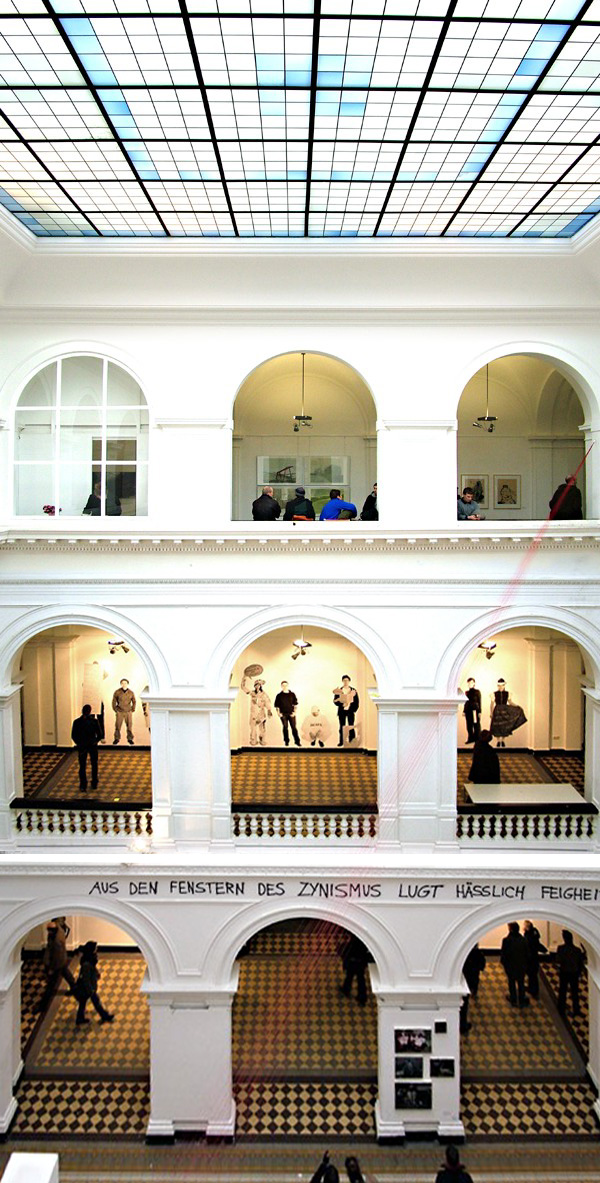
Atrium of the Hochschule für Grafik und Buchkunst Leipzig

=== University ===
Leipzig University, founded 1409, is one of Europe's oldest universities. Karl Bücher, a German economist, founded the Institut für Zeitungswissenschaften (Institute for Newspaper Science) at the University of Leipzig in 1916. It was the first institute of its kind to be established in Europe, and it marks the commencement of academic study of media communication in Germany.

Gottfried Wilhelm Leibniz, a philosopher and mathematician, was born in Leipzig in 1646, and attended the university from 1661 to 1666. Nobel Prize laureate Werner Heisenberg worked at the university as a physics professor (from 1927 to 1942), as did Nobel Prize laureates Gustav Ludwig Hertz (physics), Wilhelm Ostwald (chemistry), and Theodor Mommsen (Nobel Prize in Literature). The 2022 Nobel Prize in Physiology and Medicine went to Svante Pääbo, an honorary professor at the university. Other former university staff include mineralogist Georg Agricola, writer Gotthold Ephraim Lessing, philosopher Ernst Bloch, founder of psychophysics Gustav Theodor Fechner, and founder of modern psychology, Wilhelm Wundt. The university's notable former students include writers Johann Wolfgang Goethe and Erich Kästner, philosopher Friedrich Nietzsche, political activist Karl Liebknecht, and composer Richard Wagner. Angela Merkel, former German chancellor, studied physics at Leipzig University. The university has about 30,000 students.

A part of Leipzig University is the German Institute for Literature which was founded in 1955 under the name "Johannes R. Becher-Institut". Many noted writers have graduated from this school, including Heinz Czechowski, Kurt Drawert, Adolf Endler, Ralph Giordano, Kerstin Hensel, Sarah and Rainer Kirsch, Angela Krauß, Erich Loest, and Fred Wander. After its closure in 1990 the institute was refounded in 1995 with new teachers.

=== Visual arts and theatre ===
The Academy of Visual Arts (Hochschule für Grafik und Buchkunst) was established in 1764. Its 600 students (as of 2018) are enrolled in courses in painting and graphics, book design/graphic design, photography and media art. The school also houses an Institute for Theory.

The University of Music and Theatre offers a broad range of subjects ranging from training in orchestral instruments, voice, interpretation, coaching, piano chamber music, orchestral conducting, choir conducting, and musical composition to acting and scriptwriting.

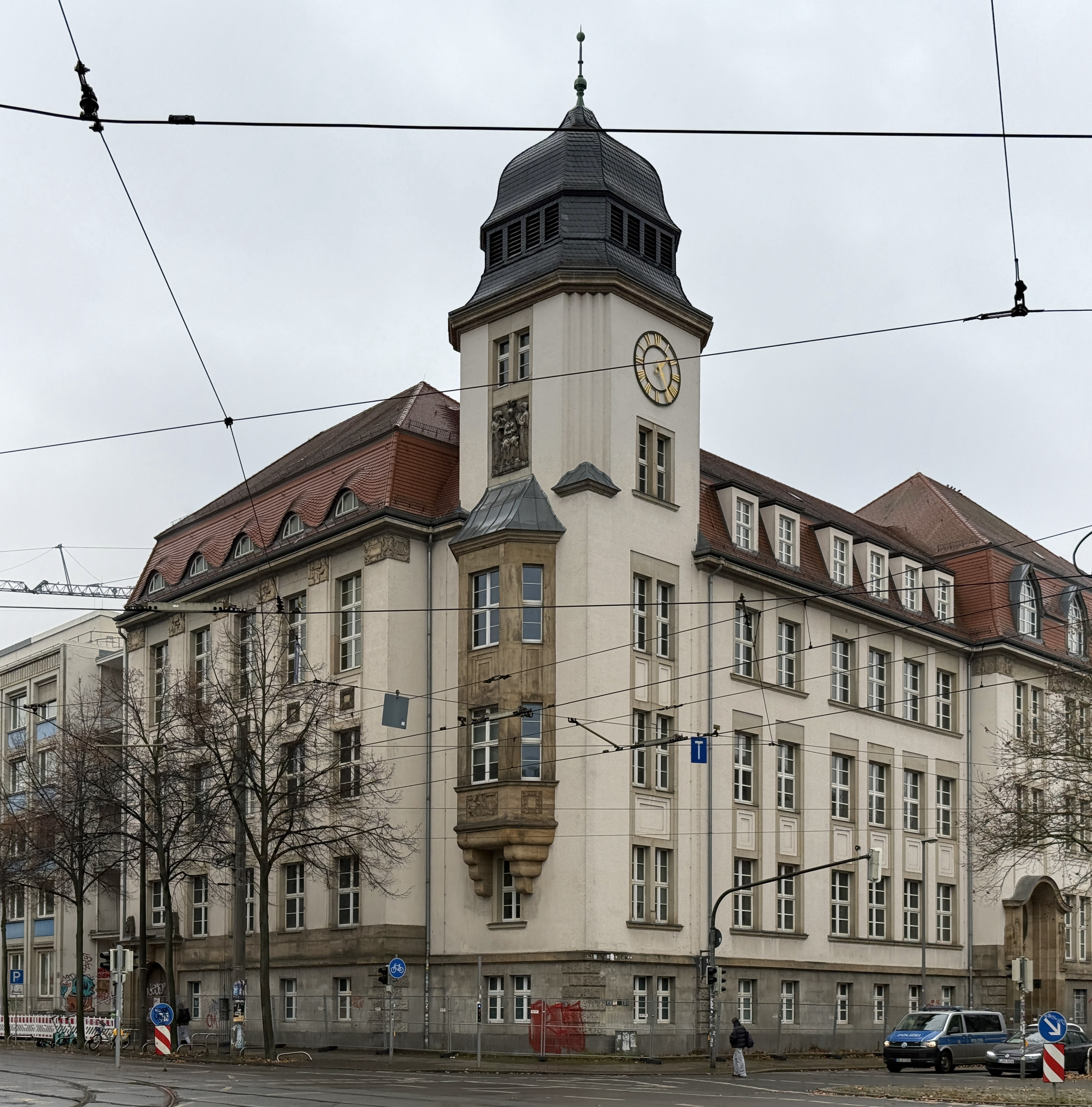
Main building of Leipzig University of Applied Sciences (HTWK)

=== University of Applied Science ===
The Leipzig University of Applied Sciences (HTWK) has approximately 6,200 students (as of 2007) and is (as of 2007) the second biggest institution of higher education in Leipzig. It was founded in 1992, merging several older schools. As a university of applied sciences (German: Fachhochschule) its status is slightly below that of a university, with more emphasis on the practical parts of education. The HTWK offers many engineering courses, as well as courses in computer science, mathematics, business administration, librarianship, museum studies, and social work. It is mainly located in the south of the city.

=== Leipzig Graduate School ===
The private Leipzig Graduate School of Management, (in German Handelshochschule Leipzig (HHL)), is the oldest business school in Germany. According to The Economist, HHL is one of the best schools in the world, ranked at number six overall.

=== Lancaster University Leipzig ===
Branch campus of Lancaster University, it is the first public UK university with a campus in Germany. Lancaster University Leipzig was founded in 2020 and currently has a diverse international student body with more than 45 nationalities.

=== Research institutes ===
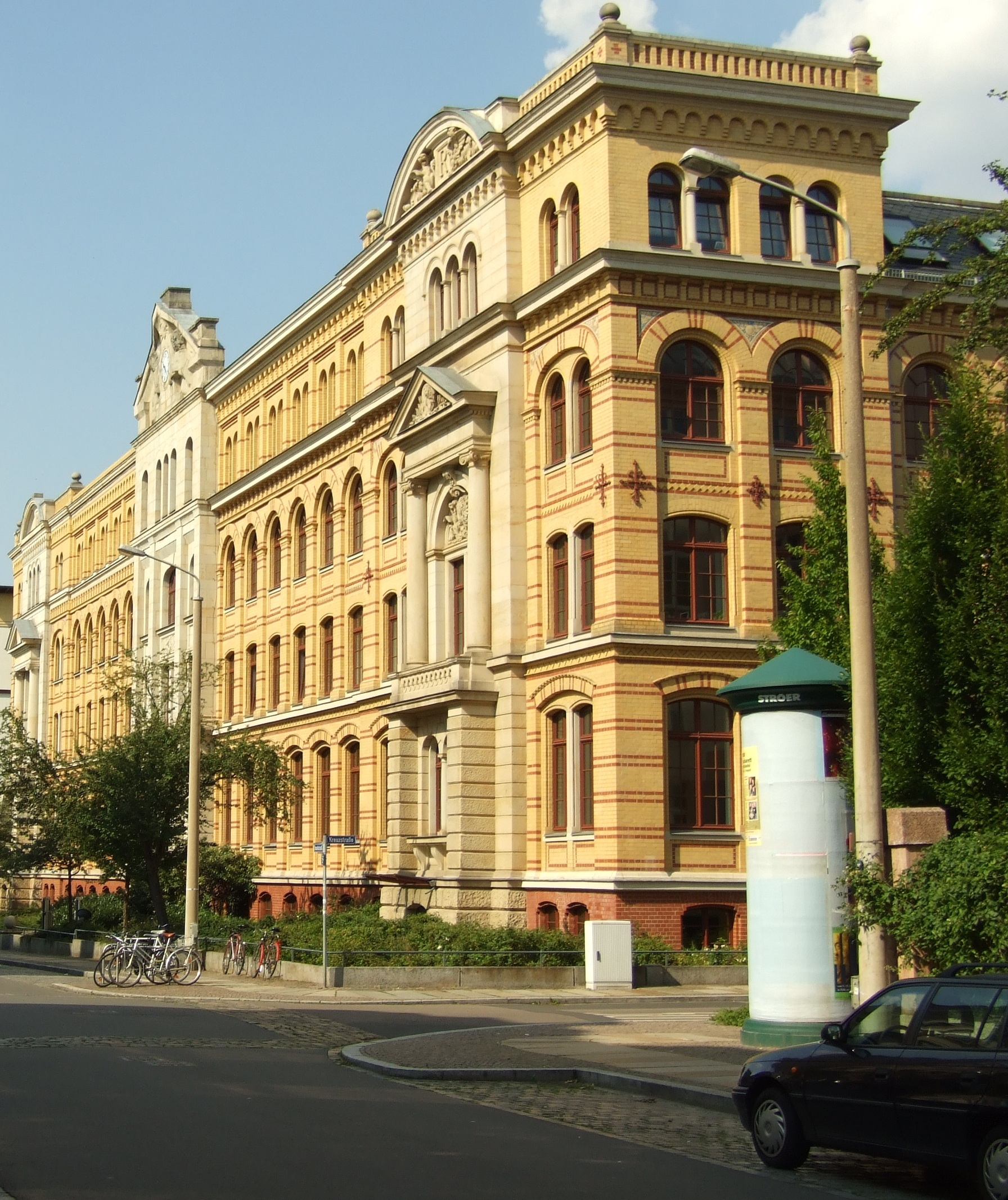
The Max Planck Institute for Mathematics in the Sciences

Leipzig is currently the home of twelve research institutes and the Saxon Academy of Sciences and Humanities.

- Max Planck Society: Max Planck Institute for Mathematics in the Sciences, Max Planck Institute for Human Cognitive and Brain Sciences, and Max Planck Institute for Evolutionary Anthropology.
- Fraunhofer Society institutes: Fraunhofer IZI and Fraunhofer IMW.
- Helmholtz Association of German Research Centres: Helmholtz Centre for Environmental Research
- Deutsches Biomasseforschungszentrum – DBFZ
- Leibniz Association: Leibniz Institute for Tropospheric Research, Leibniz-Institute IOM, Leibniz Institute for the History and Culture of Eastern Europe, Leibniz-Institute IfL, Leibniz-Institute for Jewish history and Culture – Simon Dubnow.

=== Others ===
Leipzig is home to one of the world's oldest schools, Thomasschule zu Leipzig (St. Thomas' School, Leipzig), which gained fame for its long association with the Bach family of musicians and composers.

The Lutheran Theological Seminary is a seminary of the Evangelical Lutheran Free Church in Leipzig. The seminary trains students to become pastors for the Evangelical Lutheran Free Church or for member church bodies of the Confessional Evangelical Lutheran Conference.

== Economy ==
The city is a location for automobile manufacturing by BMW and Porsche in large plants north of the city. In 2011 and 2012 DHL transferred the bulk of its European air operations from Brussels Airport to Leipzig/Halle Airport. Kirow Ardelt AG, the world market leader in breakdown cranes, is based in Leipzig. The city also houses the European Energy Exchange, the leading energy exchange in Central Europe. VNG – Verbundnetz Gas AG, one of Germany's large natural gas suppliers, is headquartered at Leipzig. In addition, inside its larger metropolitan area, Leipzig has developed an important petrochemical centre.

Some of the largest employers in the area (outside of manufacturing) include software companies such as Spreadshirt and the various schools and universities in and around the Leipzig/Halle region. The University of Leipzig attracts millions of euros of investment yearly and celebrated its 600th birthday in 2009.

Leipzig also benefits from world-leading medical research (Leipzig Heart Centre) and a growing biotechnology industry. Bio City Leipzig, established in 2003, is a biotechnology business incubator.

Many bars, restaurants, and stores in the downtown area are patronized by German and foreign tourists. Leipzig Main Train Station is the location of a shopping mall. Leipzig is one of Germany's most visited cities with over 3 million overnight stays in 2017.

In 2010, Leipzig was included in the top 10 cities to visit by The New York Times, and ranked 39th globally out of 289 cities for innovation in the 4th Innovation Cities Index published by Australian agency 2thinknow. In 2015, Leipzig have among the 30 largest German cities the third best prospects for the future. In recent years Leipzig has often been nicknamed the "Boomtown of eastern Germany" or "Hypezig". As of 2013 it had the highest rate of population growth of any German city.

Companies with operations in or around Leipzig include:

- Amazon
- Blüthner: piano-manufacturing
- BMW
- DHL
- Porsche
- Siemens
- Future Electronics
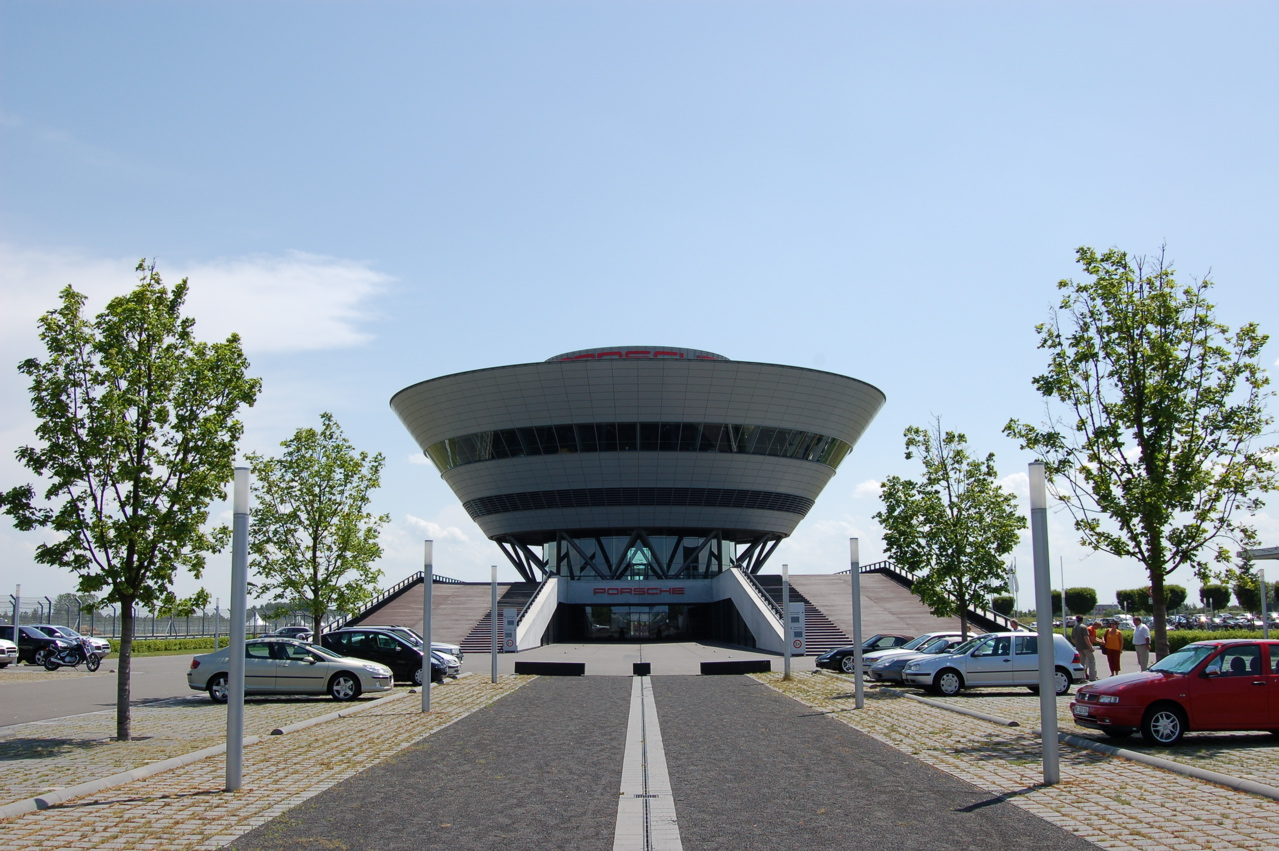
Porsche Diamond, the customer centre building of Porsche Leipzig

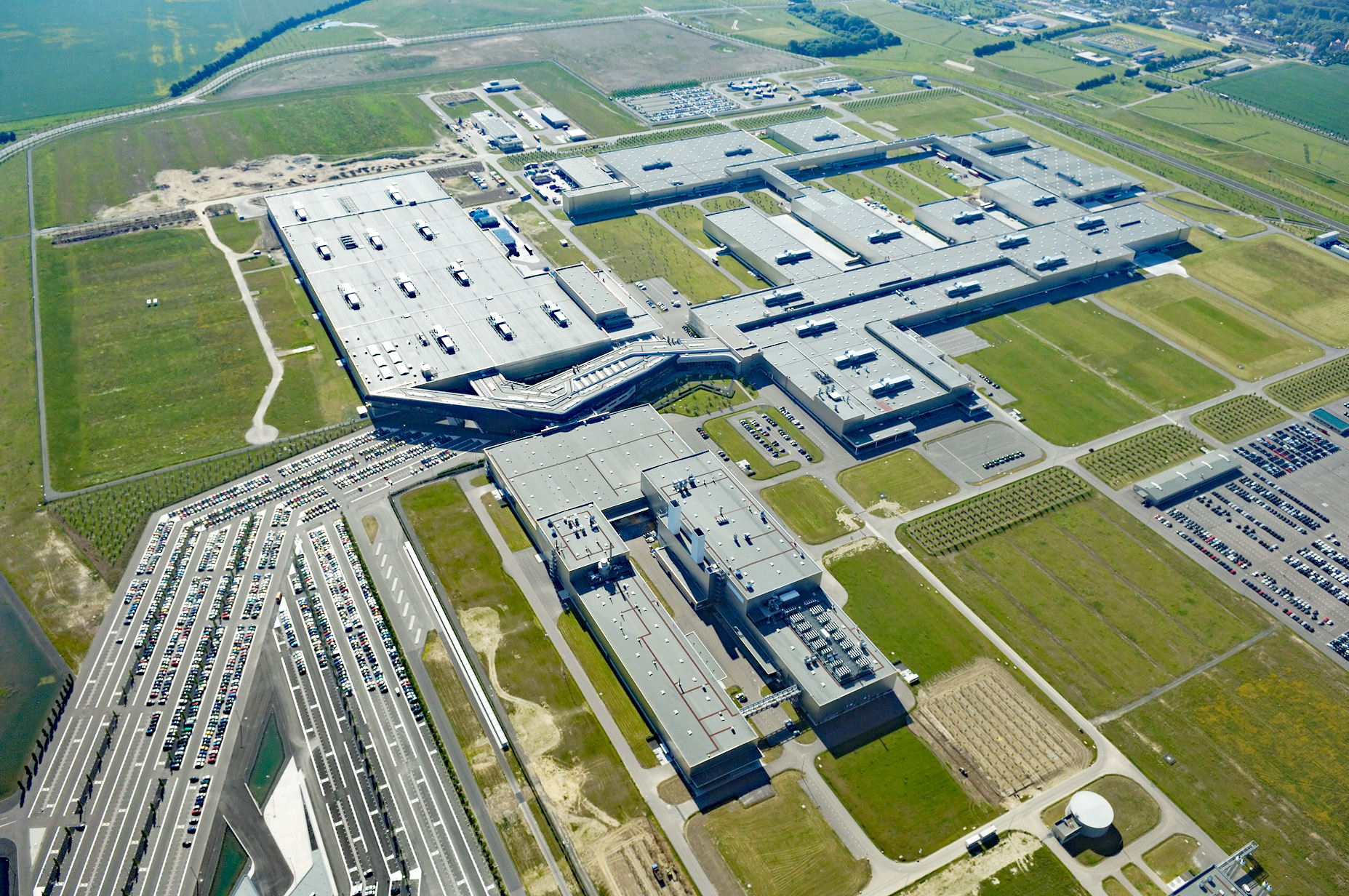
BMW production facility in Leipzig

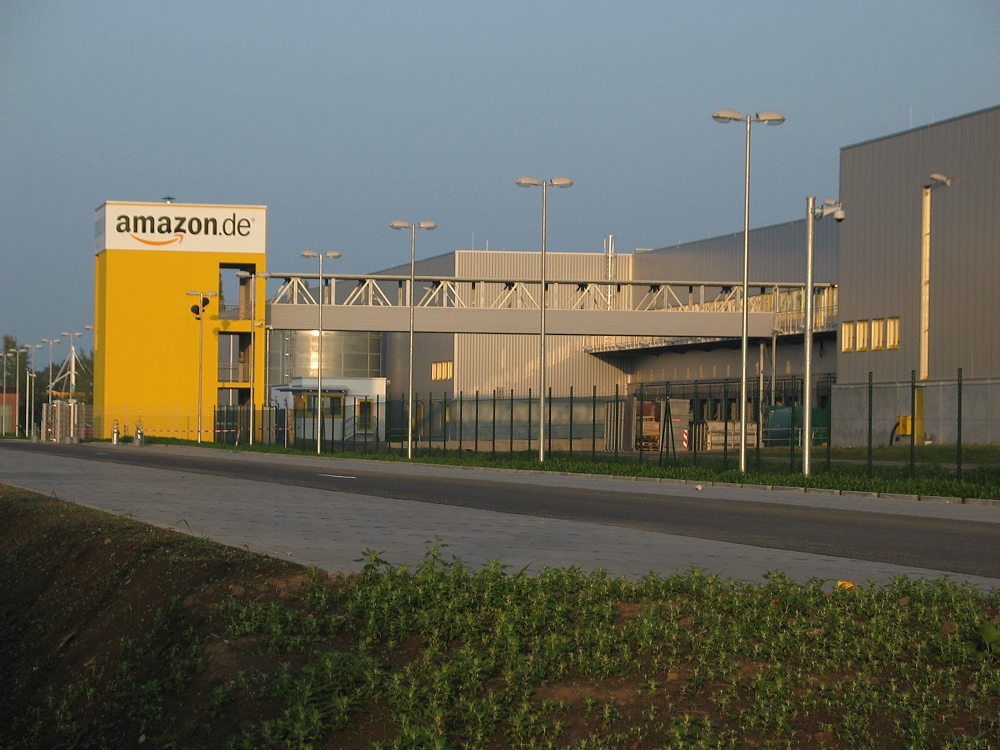
Amazon in Leipzig

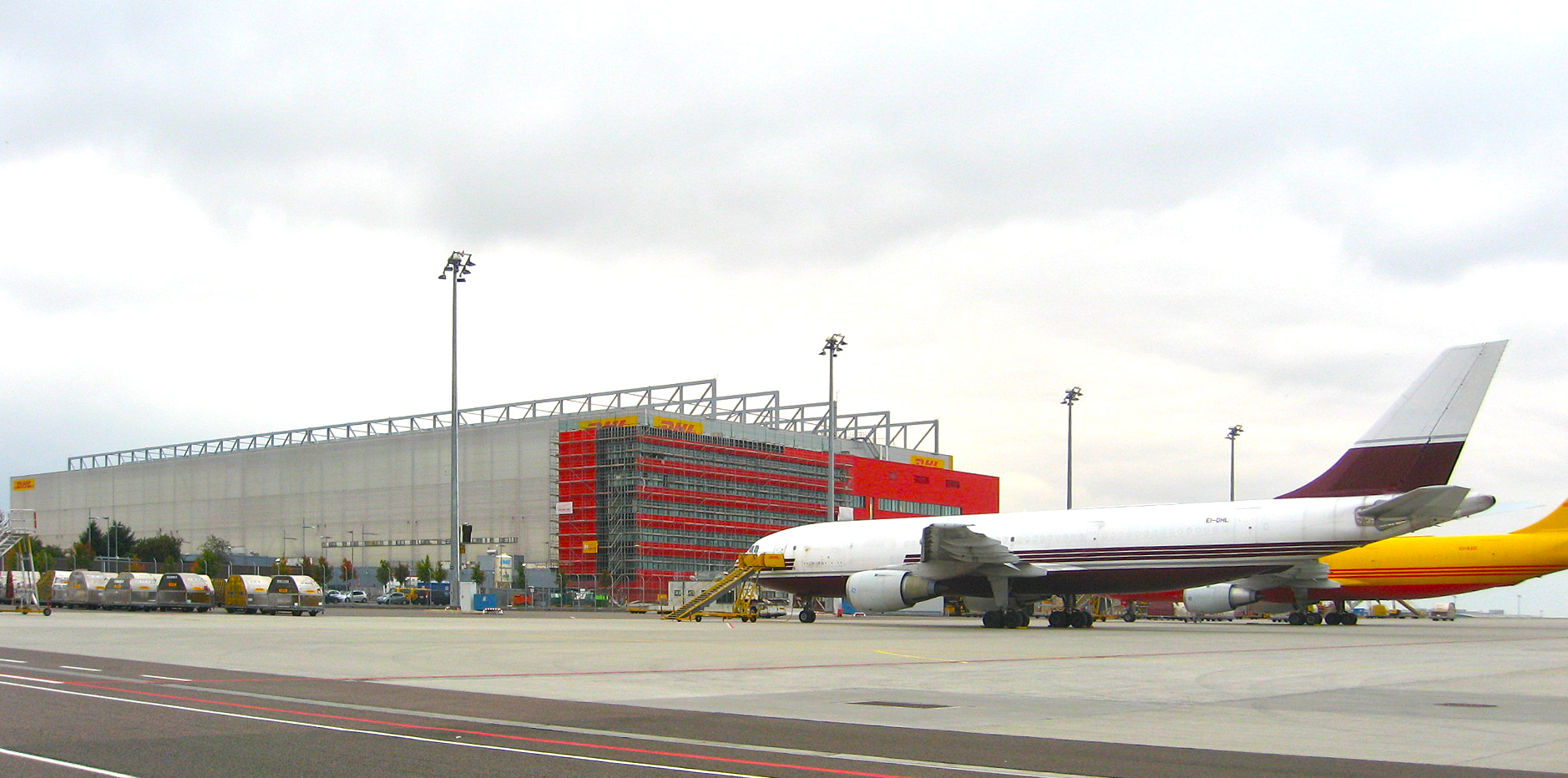
Leipzig is the hub of DHL.

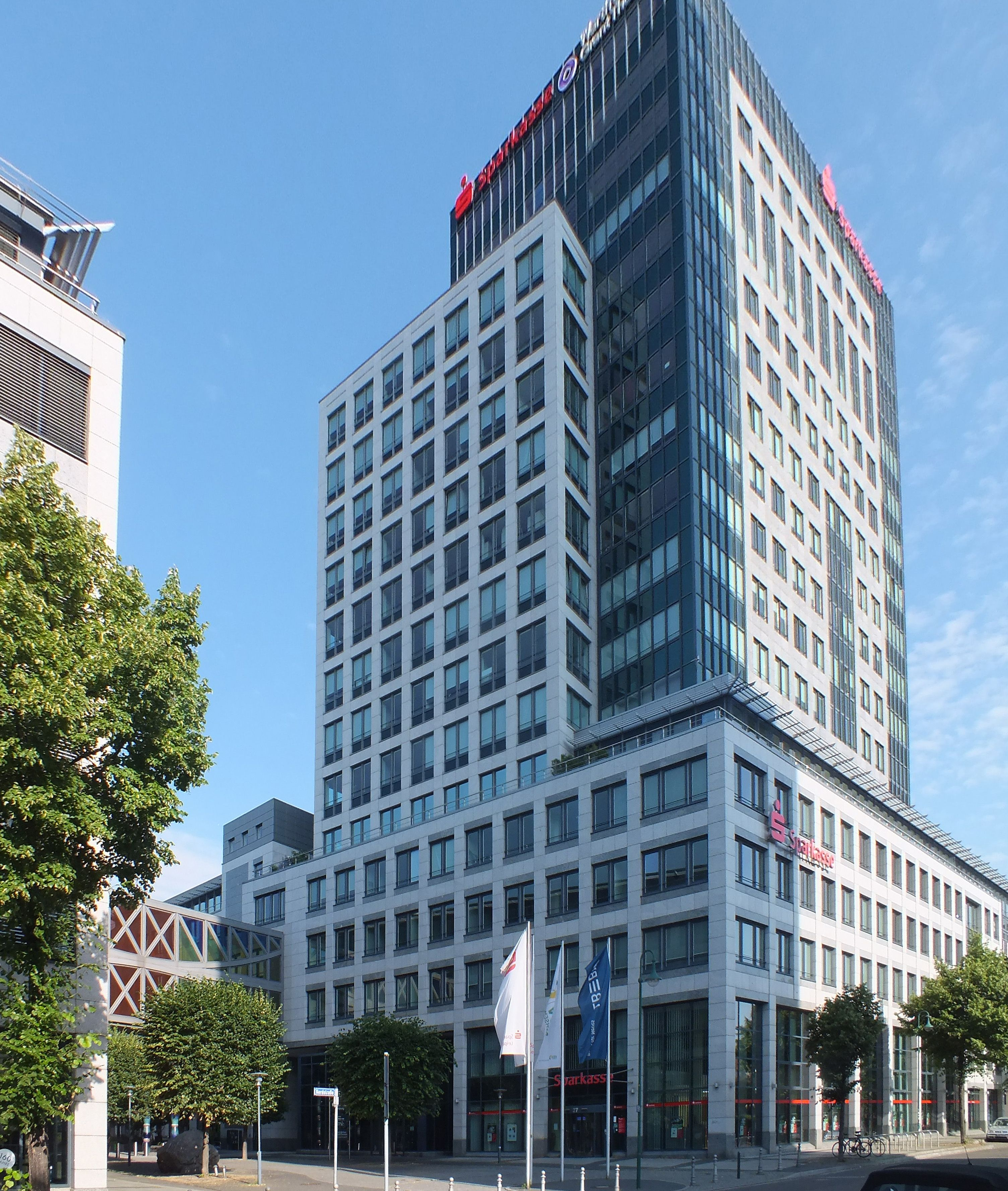
Headquarters of the Sparkasse Leipzig bank

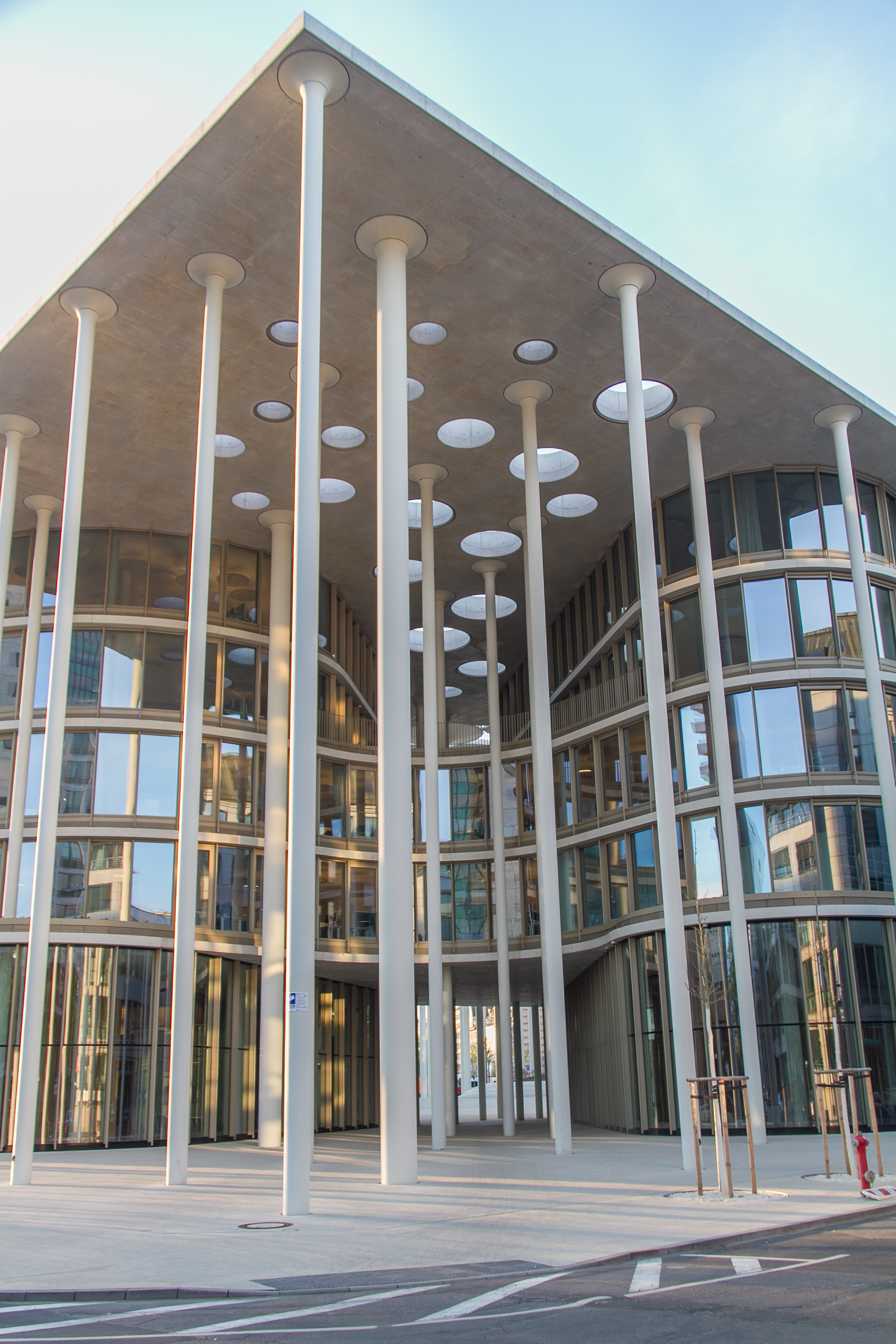
Leipzig is the seat of the Development Bank of Saxony.

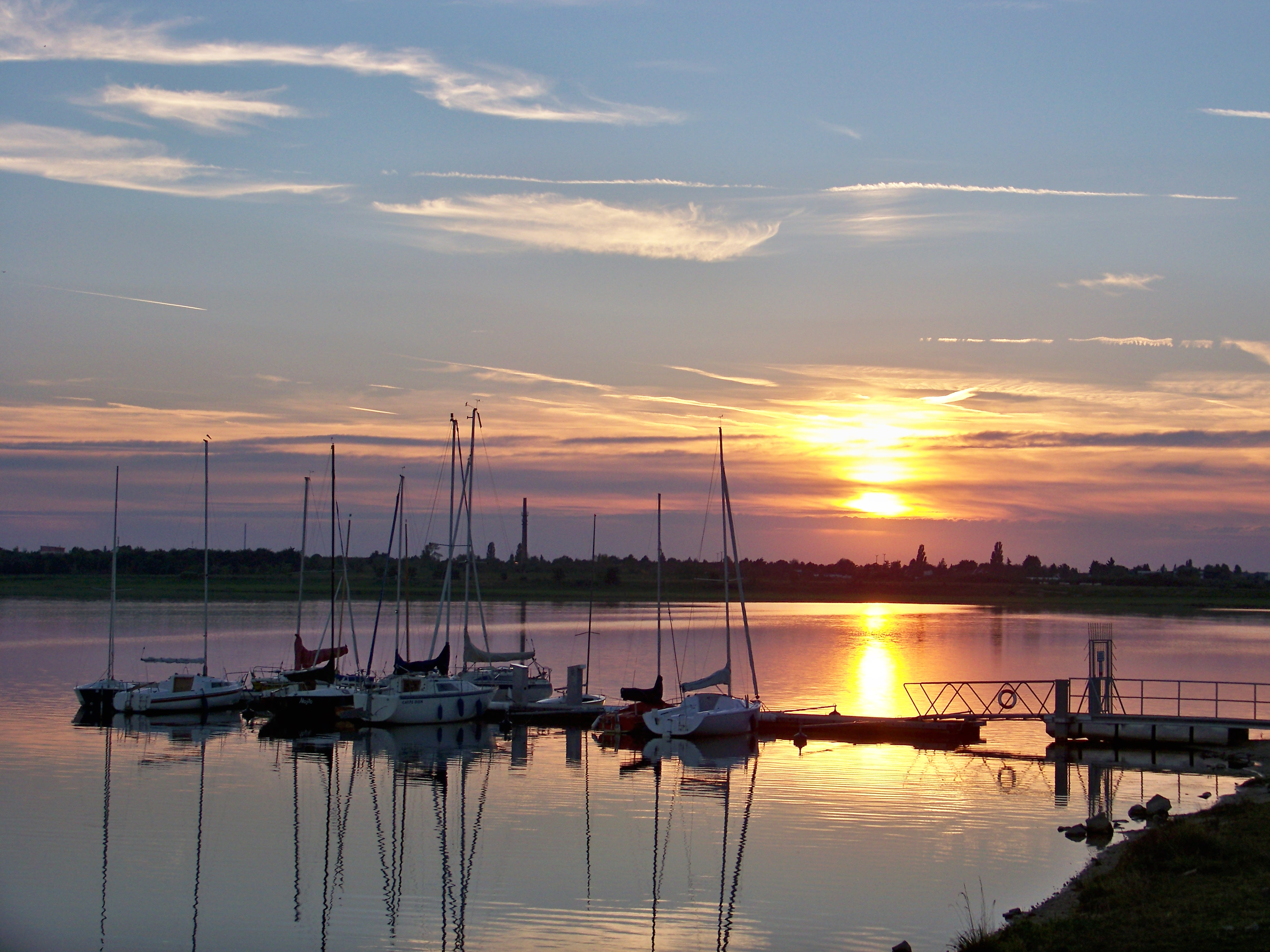
Markkleeberger See

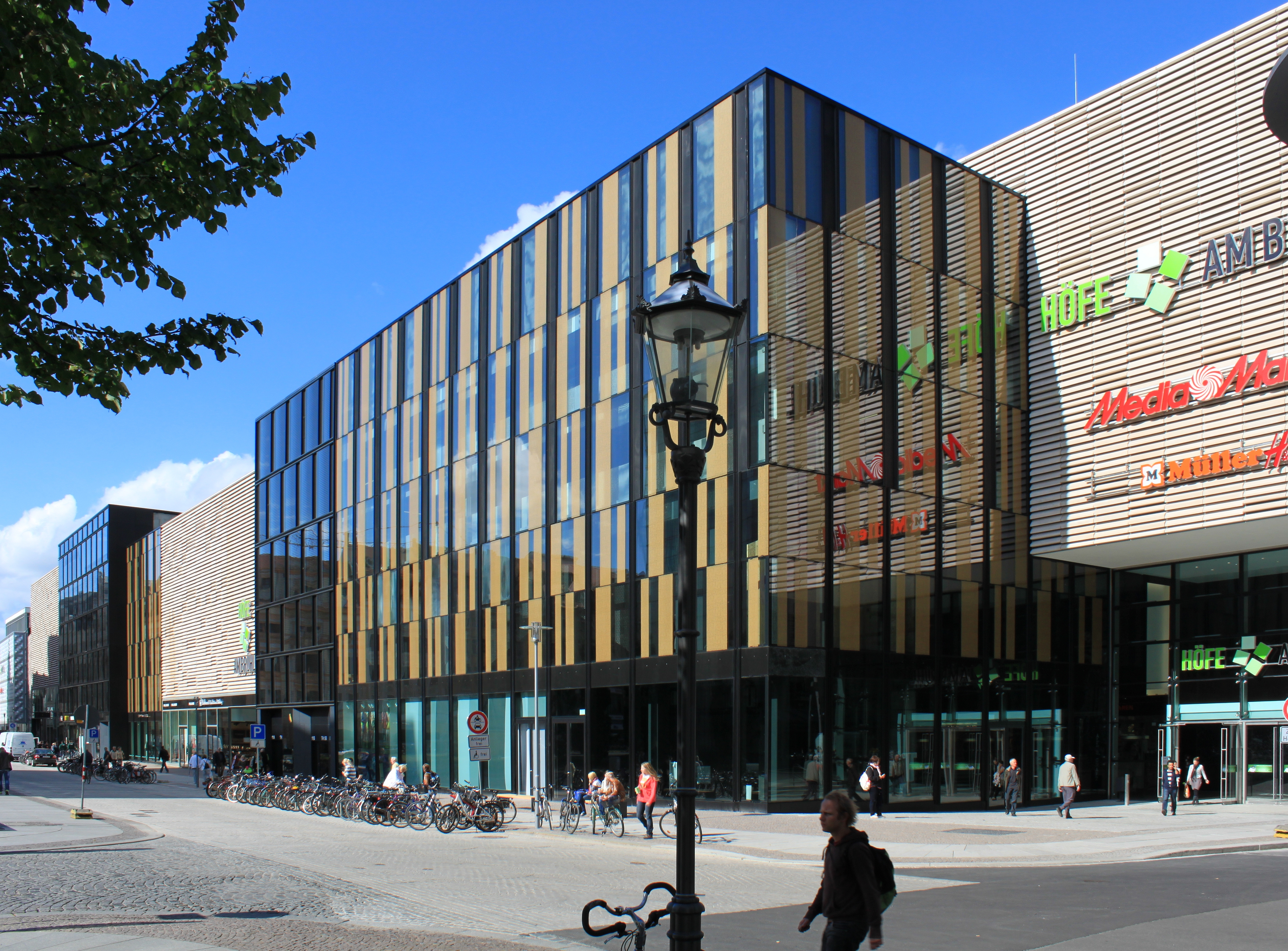
Höfe am Brühl shopping mall, situated on the former route of Via Regia, an ancient trade road

== Socio-ecological infrastructure ==
Leipzig has a dense network of socio-ecological infrastructures. Worth mentioning in the food sector are the Fairteiler of foodsharing and the numerous community-supported agricultures, in the textile sector the Umsonstladen in Plagwitz, in the bicycle self-help workshops the Radsfatz, in the computer sector the Hackerspace Die Dezentrale, and in the repair sector the Café kaputt.

== Media ==
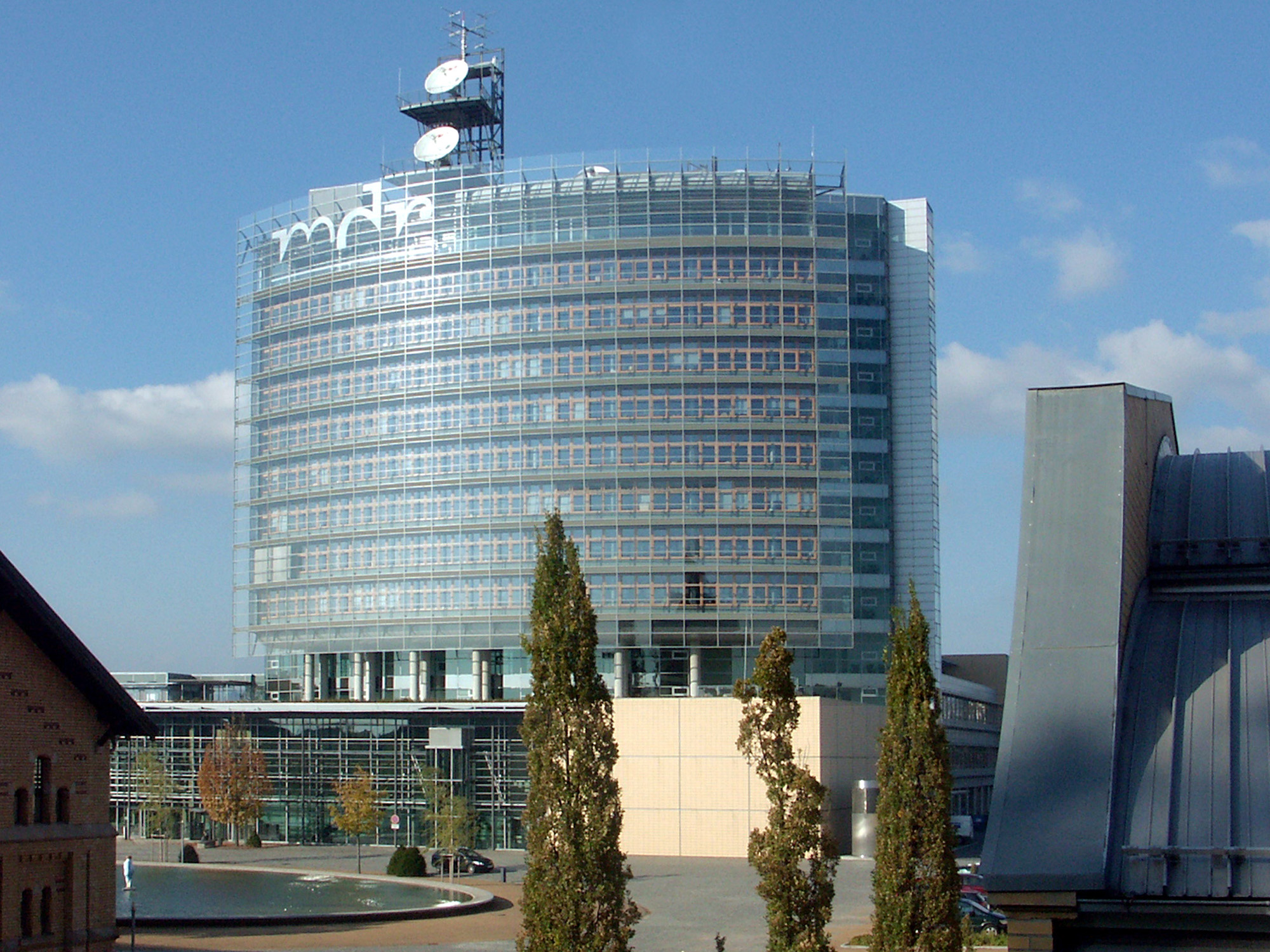
MDR, one of Germany's public broadcasters, has its headquarters in Leipzig.

- MDR, one of Germany's public broadcasters, has its headquarters and main television studios in the city. It provides programmes to various TV and radio networks and has its own symphony orchestra, choir, and ballet.
- Leipziger Volkszeitung (LVZ) is the city's only daily newspaper. Founded in 1894, it has published under several different forms of government. The monthly magazine Kreuzer specializes in culture, festivities, and the arts in Leipzig. Leipzig was also home to the world's first daily newspaper in modern times. The Einkommende Zeitungen were first published in 1650.
- Leipzig has one daily or semi-daily English-language publication, The Leipzig Glocal. It is an online-based magazine and blog that caters to an international as well as local audience. Besides publishing pages on jobs, doctors, and movies available in English and other languages, the site's team of authors writes articles about lifestyle, arts & culture, politics, entertainment, Leipzig events, etc.
- Once known for its large number of publishing houses, Leipzig had been called Buch-Stadt (book city), the most notable of them being branches of Brockhaus and Insel Verlag. Few are left after the years of economic decline during the German Democratic Republic, during which time Frankfurt developed as a much more important publishing centre. Reclam, founded in 1828, was one of the large publishing houses to move away. Leipzig still has a book fair, but Frankfurt's is far bigger.
- The German Library (Deutsche Bücherei) in Leipzig is part of Germany's National Library. Its task is to collect a copy of every book published in German.

== Quality of life ==
In December 2013, according to a study by GfK, Leipzig was ranked as the most livable city in Germany.

In 2015/2016, Leipzig was named by the consumer portal verbraucherzentrale.de as the second-best city for students in Germany (after Munich).

In a 2017 study from the Institut für Handelsforschung Köln, the Leipzig inner city ranked first among all large cities in Germany due to its urban aesthetics, gastronomy, and shopping opportunities.

According to HWWI/Berenberg-Städteranking, since 2018 it also has the second-best future prospects of all cities in Germany, second to Munich in 2018 and Berlin in 2019.

According to a 2017 Global Least & Most Stressful Cities Ranking by Zipjet, a London-based online laundry service, Leipzig was one of the least stressful cities in the World. It was ranked 25th out of 150 cities worldwide and above Dortmund, Cologne, Frankfurt, and Berlin.

Leipzig was named European City of the Year at the 2019 Urbanism Awards.

According to the 2019 study by Forschungsinstitut Prognos, Leipzig is the most dynamic region in Germany. Within 15 years, the city climbed 230 places and occupied in 2019 rank 104 of all 401 German regions.

Leipzig was listed as one of 52 places to go in 2020 by The New York Times and the highest-ranking German destination.

Leipzig Hauptbahnhof has been ranked the best railway station in Germany and the third-best in Europe in a consumer organisation poll, surpassed only by St Pancras railway station and Zürich Hauptbahnhof.

== Transport ==
Founded at the crossing of Via Regia and Via Imperii, Leipzig has been a major interchange of inter-European traffic and commerce since medieval times. After the Reunification of Germany, immense efforts to restore and expand the traffic network have been undertaken and left the city area with an excellent infrastructure.

=== Air ===
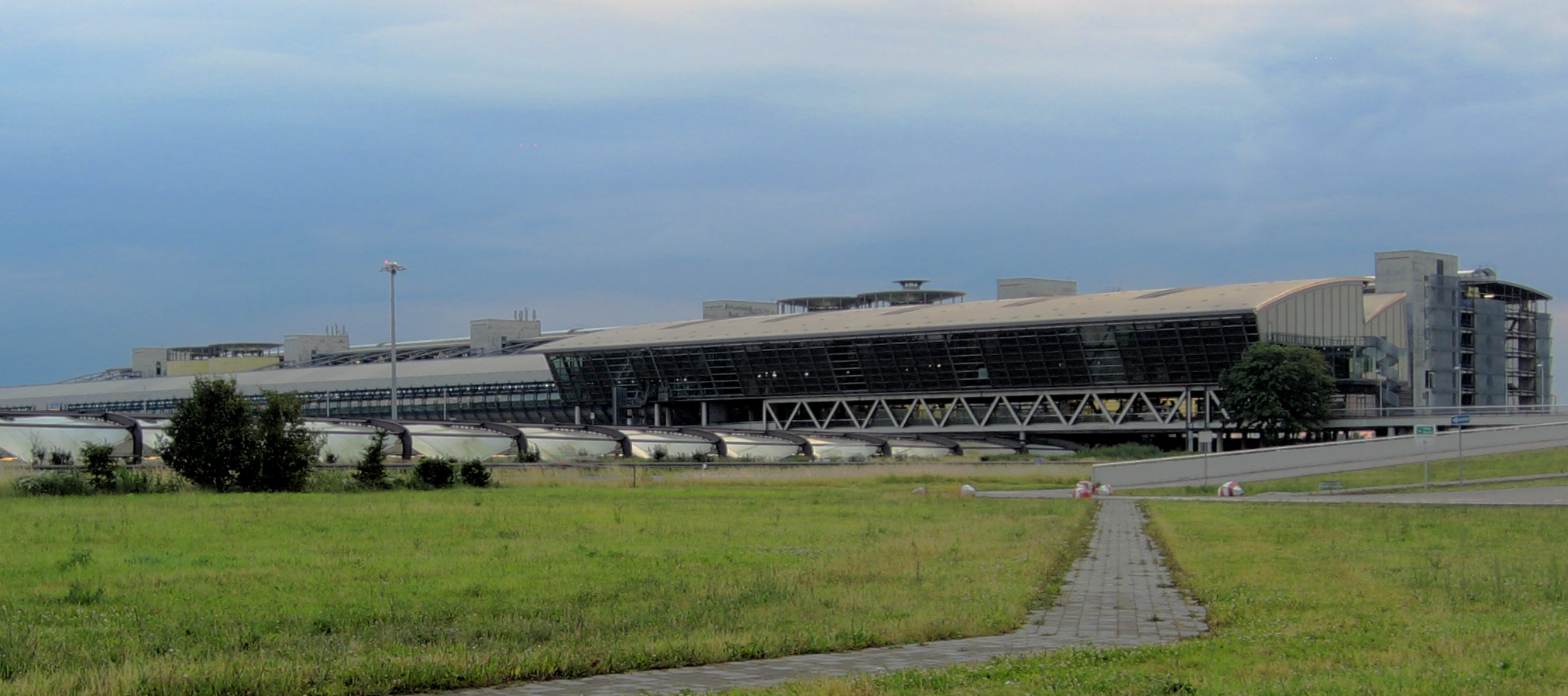
Leipzig/Halle Airport, hub of DHL

Leipzig/Halle Airport is the international commercial airport of the region. It is located at the Schkeuditzer Kreuz junction northwest of Leipzig, halfway between the two major cities. The easternmost section of the new Erfurt-Leipzig/Halle line under construction gave the airport a long-distance railway station, which was also integrated into the ICE network when the railway line was completed in 2015.

Passenger flights are operated to and from the major German hub airports, European metropolises and holiday destinations, especially to the Mediterranean region and North Africa. The airport is of international importance in the cargo sector. In Germany, it ranks second behind Frankfurt am Main, fifth in Europe and 26th worldwide (as of 2011). DHL uses the airport as its central European hub. It is also the home base of the freight airlines Aerologic and European Air Transport Leipzig.

The former military airport near Altenburg, Thuringia, called Leipzig–Altenburg Airport, about a half-hour drive from Leipzig, was served by Ryanair until 2010.

Berlin Brandenburg Airport can be reached from Leipzig in one and a half hours by train since December 2025.

=== Railways ===
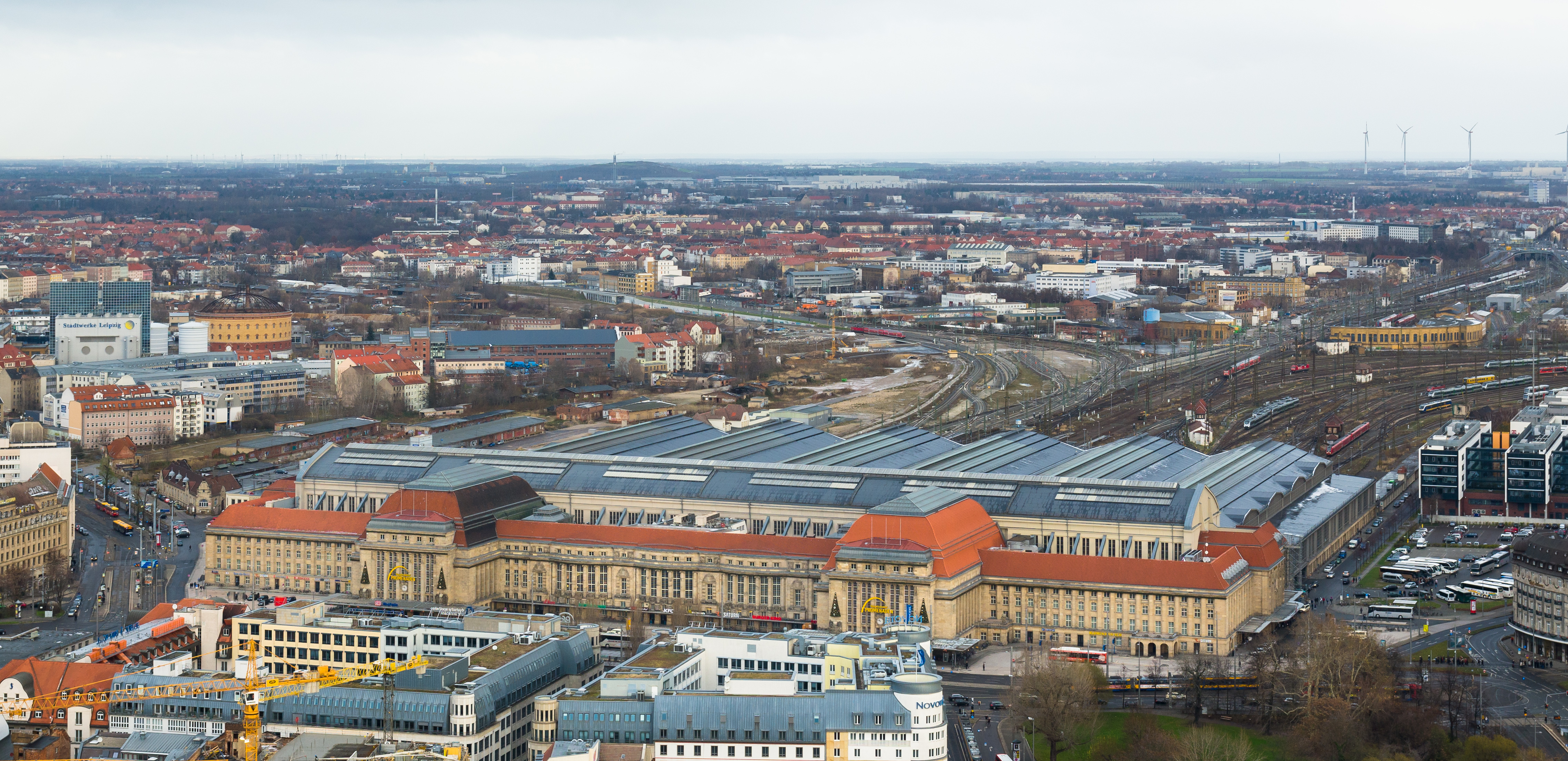
Leipzig Hauptbahnhof is the main hub of the tram and railway network and the world's largest railway station by floor area.

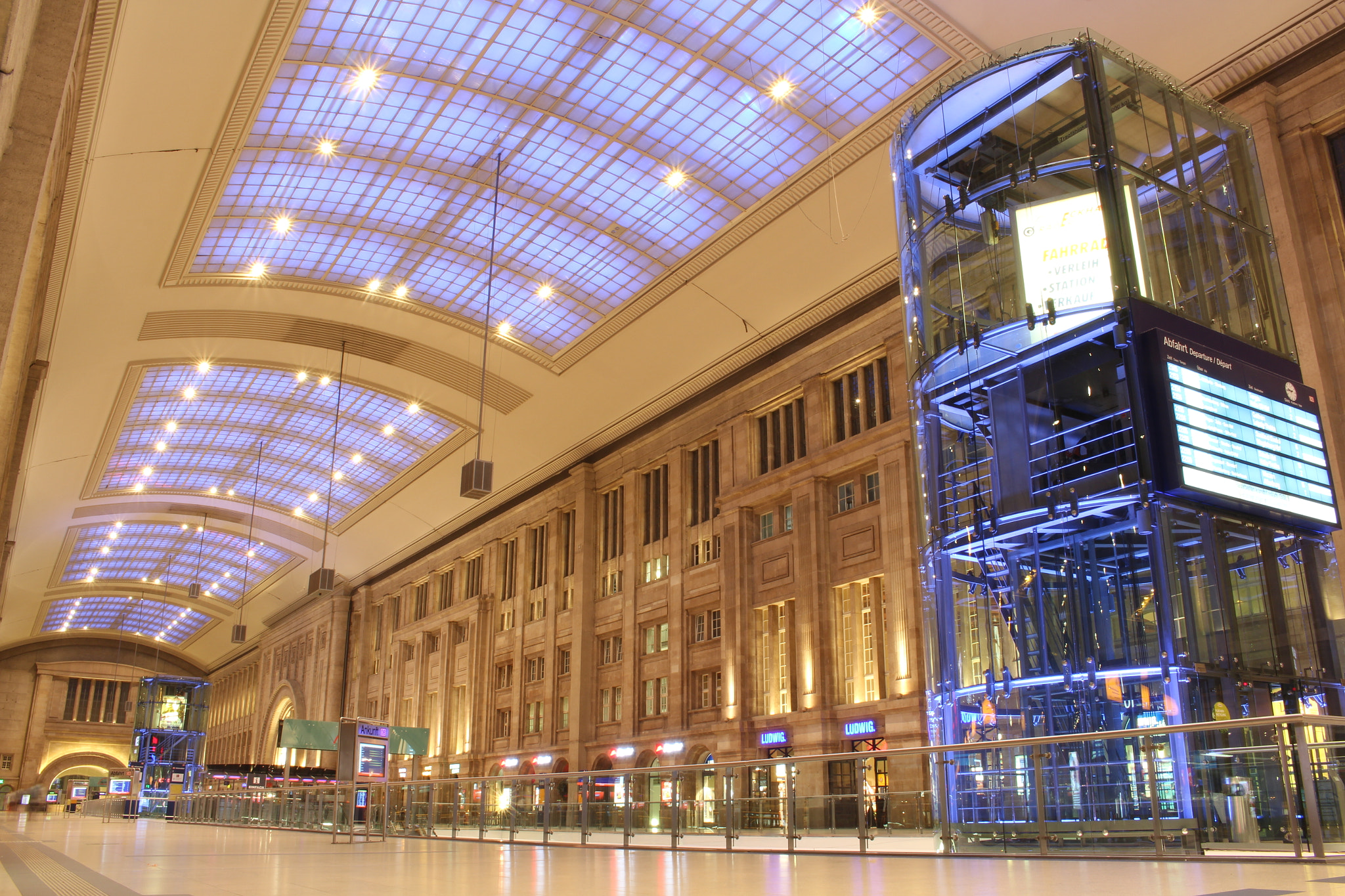
Inside Leipzig Hauptbahnhof

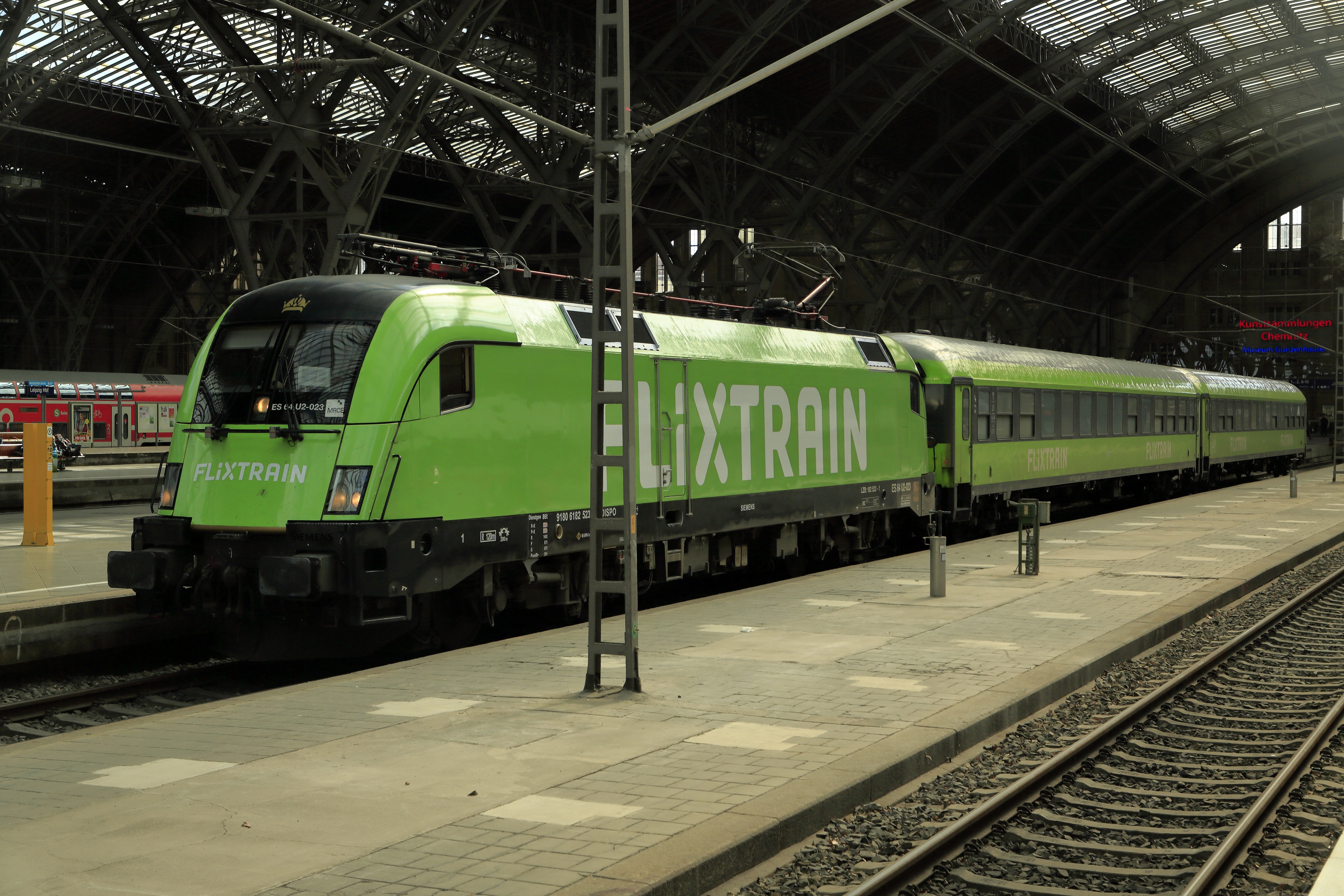
Flixtrain in Leipzig Hbf

Opened in 1915, Leipzig Hauptbahnhof (lit. main station) is the largest overhead railway station in Europe in terms of its built-up area. At the same time, it is an important supra-regional junction in the Intercity-Express (ICE) and Intercity network of the Deutsche Bahn as well as a connection point for S-Bahn and regional traffic in the Halle/Leipzig area.

In Leipzig the Intercity Express routes (Hamburg–)Berlin–Leipzig–Nuremberg–Munich and Dresden–Leipzig–Erfurt–Frankfurt am Main–(Wiesbaden/Saarbrücken) intersect. Leipzig is also the starting point for the intercity lines Leipzig-Halle (Saale)–Magdeburg–Hannover–Dortmund–Köln and –Bremen–Oldenburg(–Norddeich Mole). Both lines complement each other at hourly intervals and also stop at Leipzig/Halle Airport. The only international connection is the daily EuroCity Leipzig-Prague.

Most major and medium-sized towns in Saxony and southern Saxony-Anhalt can be reached without changing trains. There are also direct connections via regional express lines to Falkenberg/Elster-Cottbus, Hoyerswerda, and Dessau-Magdeburg as well as Chemnitz. Neighbouring Halle (Saale) can be reached via three S-Bahn lines, two of which run via Leipzig/Halle Airport. The surrounding area of Leipzig is served by numerous regional and S-Bahn lines.

The city's railway connections are currently being greatly improved by major construction projects, particularly within the framework of the German Unity transport projects. The line to Berlin has been extended and has been passable at 200 km/h (120 mph) since 2006. On 13 December 2015, the high-speed line from Leipzig to Erfurt, designed for 300 km/h (190 mph), was put into operation. Its continuation to Nuremberg followed in December 2017. This integration into the high-speed network considerably reduced the journey times of the ICE from Leipzig to Nuremberg, Munich, and Frankfurt am Main. The Leipzig-Dresden railway line, which was the first German long-distance railway to go into operation in 1839, is also undergoing expansion for 200 km/h. The most important construction project in regional transport was the four-kilometer-long city tunnel, which went into operation in December 2013 as the main line of the S-Bahn Mitteldeutschland.

There are freight stations in the districts of Wahren and Engelsdorf. In addition, a freight traffic centre has been set up near the Schkeuditzer Kreuz junction for goods handling between road and rail, as well as a freight station on the site of the DHL hub at Leipzig/Halle Airport.

=== Suburban trains ===
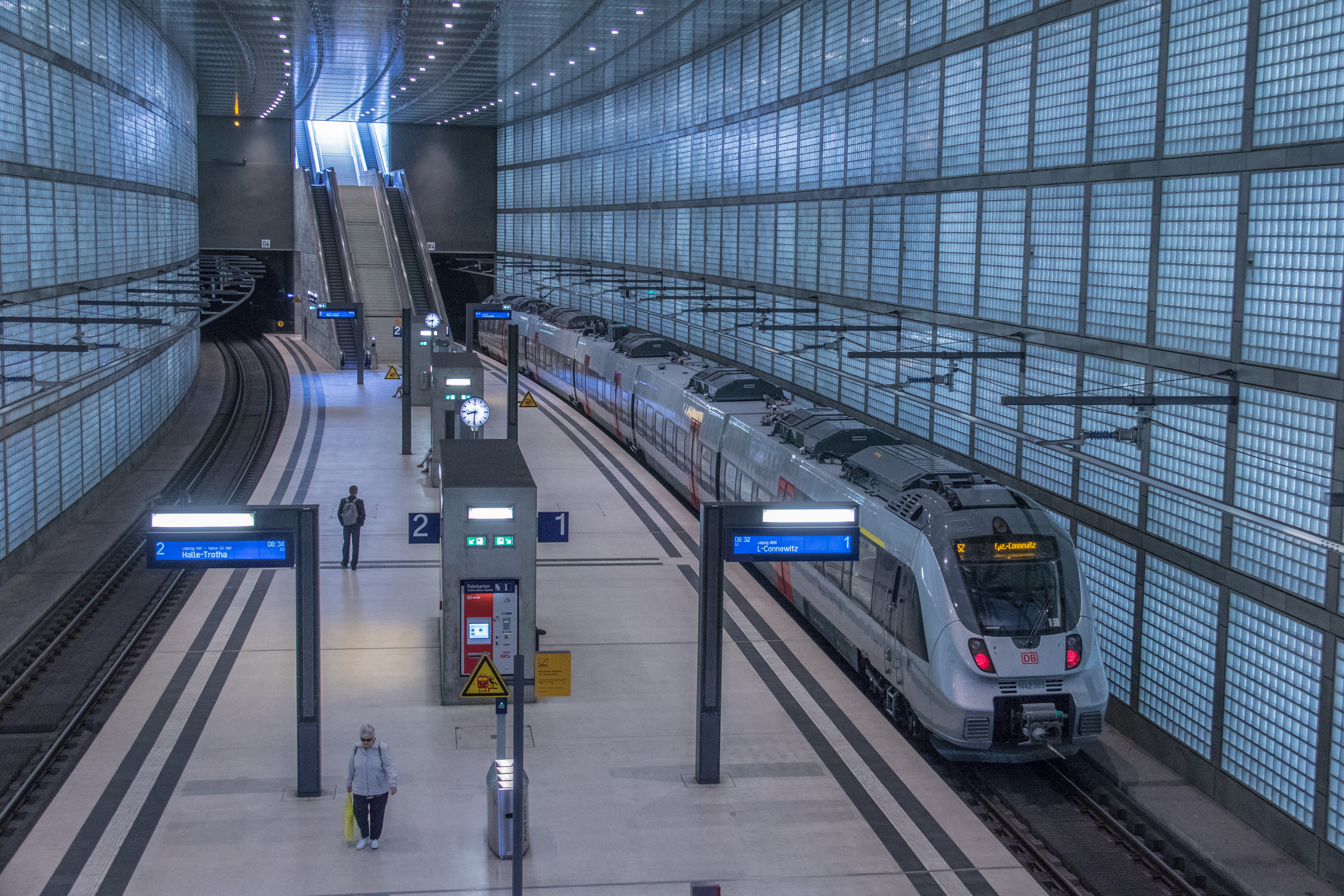
Leipzig Wilhelm-Leuschner-Platz station, August 2016

Leipzig is the core of the S-Bahn Mitteldeutschland line network. Together with the tram, six of the ten lines form the backbone of local public transport and an important link to the region and the neighbouring Halle. The main line of the S-Bahn consists of the underground S-Bahn stations Hauptbahnhof, Markt, Wilhelm-Leuschner-Platz, and Bayerischer Bahnhof leading through the City Tunnel as well as the above-ground station Leipzig MDR. There are a total of 30 S-Bahn stations in the Leipzig city area. Endpoints of the S-Bahn lines include Wurzen, Zwickau, Dessau, and Lutherstadt Wittenberg. Two lines run to Halle, one of them via Leipzig/Halle Airport.

With the timetable change in December 2004, the networks of Leipzig and Halle were combined to form the Leipzig-Halle S-Bahn. However, this network only served as a transitional solution and was replaced by the S-Bahn Mitteldeutschland on 15 December 2013. At the same time, the main line tunnel, marketed as the Leipzig City Tunnel, went into operation. The tunnel, which is almost four kilometres long, crosses the entire city centre from the main railway station to the Bavarian railway station. The S-Bahn stations are up to 22 metres underground. This construction was the first to create a continuous north–south axis, which had not existed until now due to the north-facing terminus station. The connection to the south of the city and the federal state will thus be greatly improved.

=== Tramway and buses ===
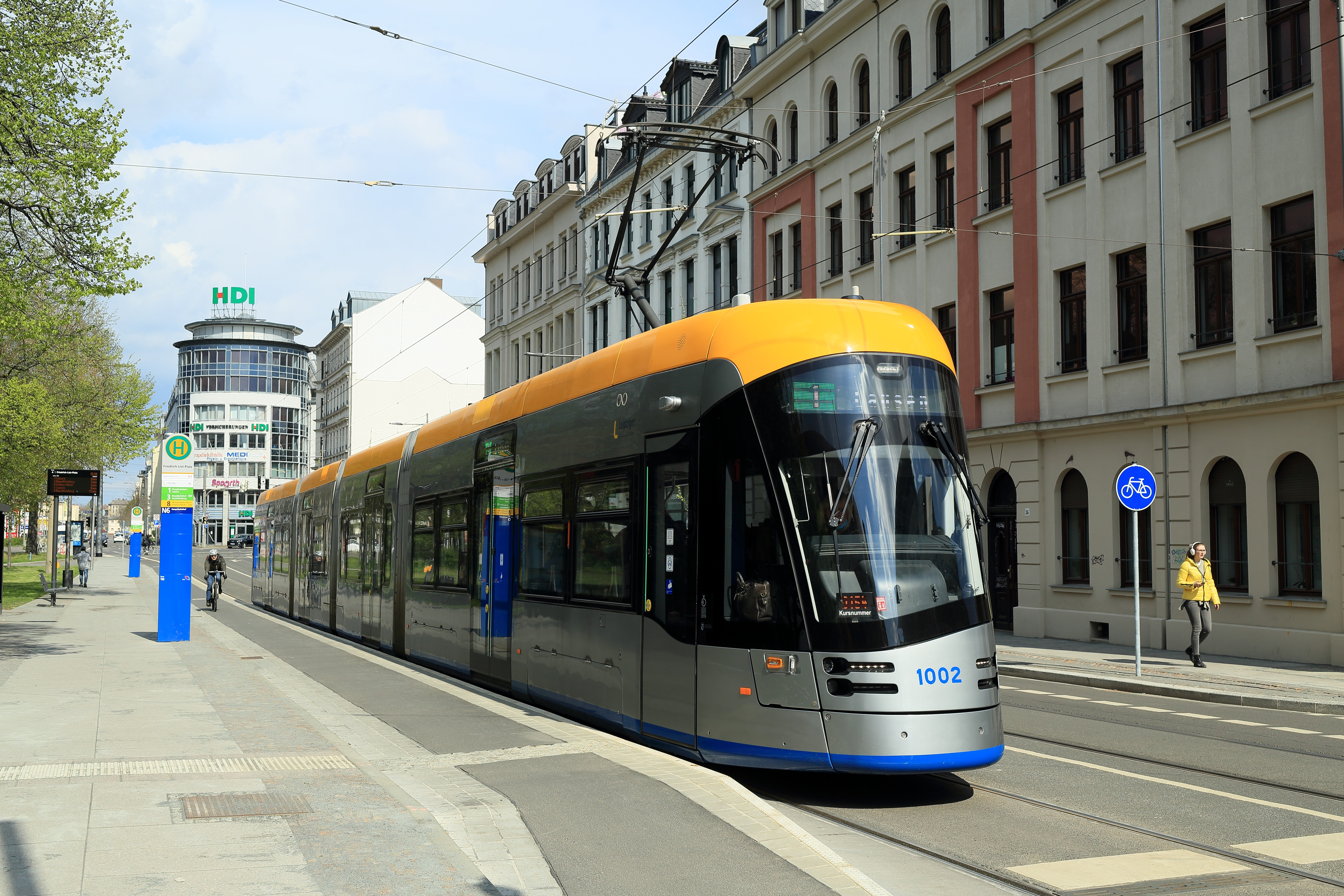
Tram at Friedrich-List-Platz

The Leipziger Verkehrsbetriebe, existing since 1 January 1917, operate a total of 15 tram lines and 47 bus lines in the city.

The total length of the tram network is 146 km (91 mi), making it the largest in Saxony ahead of Dresden (134.4 km (83.5 mi)) and the second largest in Germany after Berlin (196 km (122 mi)).

The longest line in the Leipzig network is line 11, which connects Schkeuditz with Markkleeberg over 22 kilometres and is the only tram line in Leipzig to run in three tariff zones of the Central German Transport Association.

Night bus lines N1 to N9 and the night tram N17 operate in the night traffic. On Saturdays, Sundays, and holidays the tram line N10 and the bus line N60 also operate. The central transfer point between the bus and tram lines as well as to the S-Bahn is Leipzig Central Station.

=== Bicycle ===
Like most German cities, Leipzig has a traffic layout designed to be bicycle-friendly. There is an extensive cycle network. In most of the one-way central streets, cyclists are explicitly allowed to cycle both ways. A few cycle paths have been built or declared since 1990. According to the data from the 2021/22 traffic count, the Saxons' Bridge has the highest traffic occupancy with over 15,000 cyclists per day in cycling in Leipzig.

Since 2004, there is a bicycle-sharing system. Bikes can be borrowed and returned via smartphone app or by telephone. Since 2018, the system has enabled flexible borrowing and returning of bicycles in the inner city; in this zone, bicycles can be handed in and borrowed from almost any street corner. Outside these zones, there are stations where the bikes are waiting. The current locations of the bikes can be seen via the app. There are cooperation offers with the Leipzig public transport companies and car sharing in order to offer as complete a mobility chain as possible.

=== Road ===
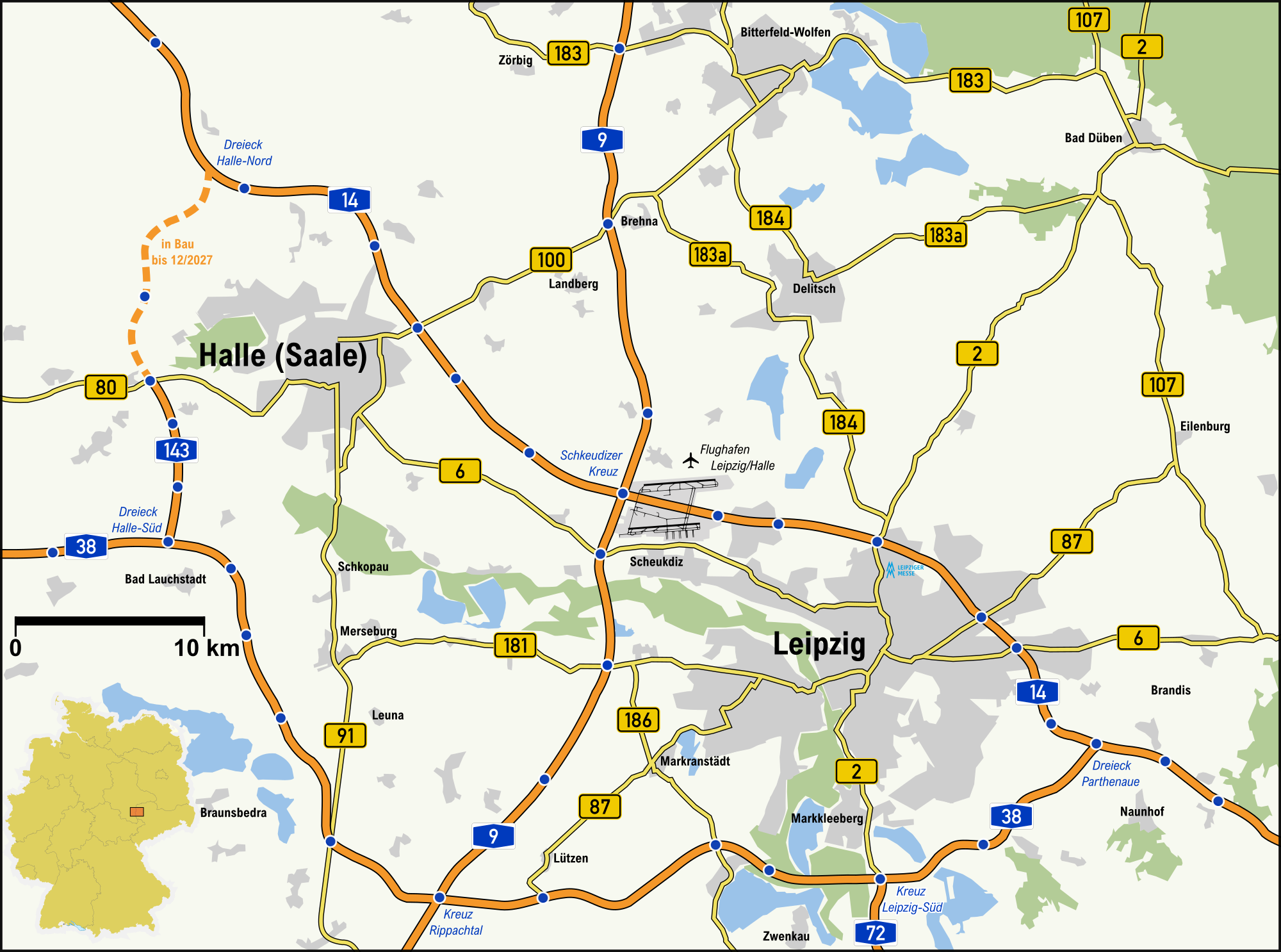
Leipzig's road network

Several federal motorways pass by Leipzig: the A 14 in the north, the A 9 in the west, and the A 38 in the south. The three motorways form a triangular partial ring of the double ring Mitteldeutsche Schleife around Halle and Leipzig. To the south toward Chemnitz, the A 72 is also partly under construction.

The federal roads B 2, B 6, B 87, B 181, and B 184 lead through the city area.

The ring road (Innenstadtring), which corresponds to the course of the old city fortification, surrounds the city centre of Leipzig, which today is largely traffic-calmed.

Leipzig has a dense network of carsharing stations. Additionally, since 2018 there is also a stationless car sharing system in Leipzig. Here the cars can be parked and booked anywhere in the inner city without having to define a specific car or period in advance. Finding and booking is done via a smartphone app.

Leipzig is one of the few cities in Germany with vehicle for hire services that can be booked via a mobile app. In contrast to taxicab services, the start and destination must be defined beforehand and other passengers can be taken along at the same time if they share a route.

=== Long-distance buses ===
In March 2018, the Leipzig Long-Distance Bus Terminal opened a few steps outside of the Hauptbahnhof building on its east side.

In addition to a large number of national lines, several international lines also serve Leipzig. The cities of Bregenz, Budapest, Milan, Prague, Sofia, and Zurich, among others, can be reached without having to change trains. Around 30,000 journeys and 1.5 million passengers a year are expected at the new bus station.

Some lines also use Leipzig/Halle Airport, located at the A 9/A 14 motorway junction, and Leipziger Messe for a stop. Passengers can take the S-Bahn from there to the city centre.

=== Water ===
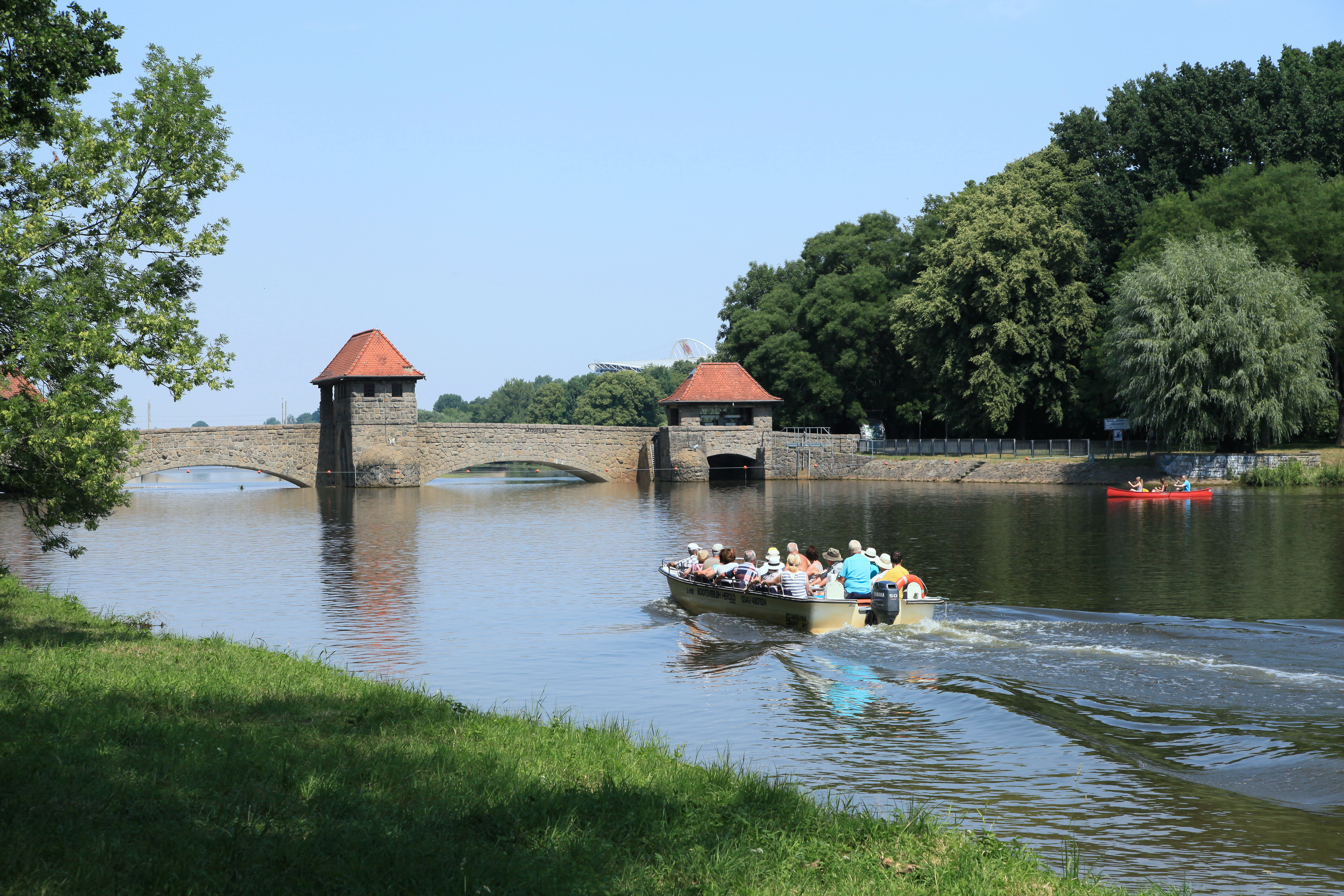
Boats at the Elsterflutbett

In the first half of the 20th century, the construction of the Elster-Saale canal, White Elster, and Saale was started in Leipzig in order to connect to the network of waterways. The outbreak of the Second World War stopped most of the work, though some may have continued through the use of forced labor. The Lindenauer port was almost completed but not yet connected to the Elster-Saale and Karl Heine Canal respectively. The Leipzig rivers (White Elster, New Luppe, Pleiße, and Parthe) in the city have largely artificial river beds and are supplemented by some channels. These waterways are suitable only for small leisure boat traffic.

Through the renovation and reconstruction of existing mill races and watercourses in the south of the city and flooded disused open cast mines, the city's navigable water network is being expanded. A link between Karl Heine Canal and the disused Lindenauer port was opened in 2015. Still more work was scheduled to complete the Elster-Saale canal. Such a move would allow small boats to reach the Elbe from Leipzig. The intended completion date has been postponed because of an unacceptable cost-benefit ratio.

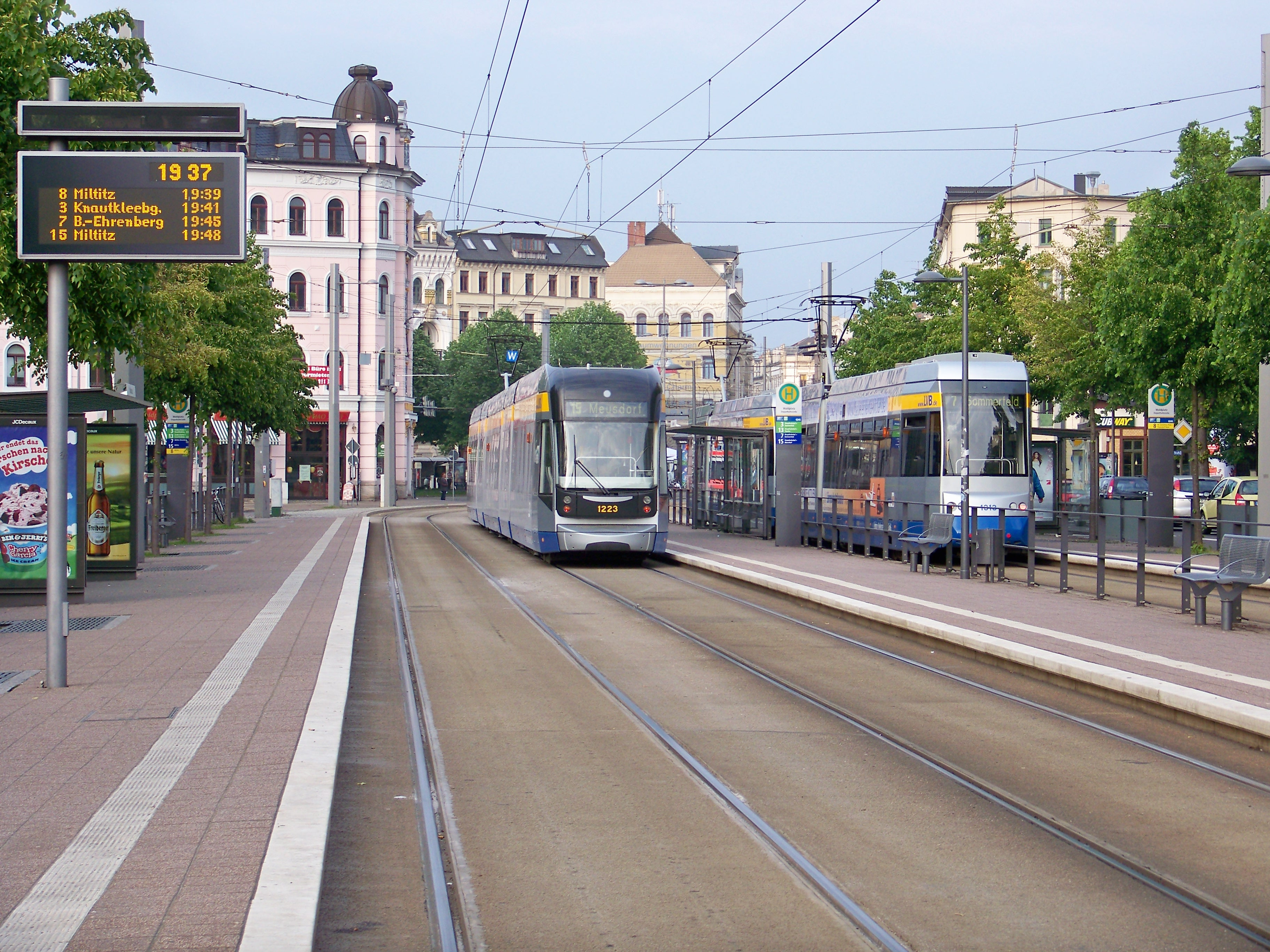
Tram of Leipziger Verkehrsbetriebe

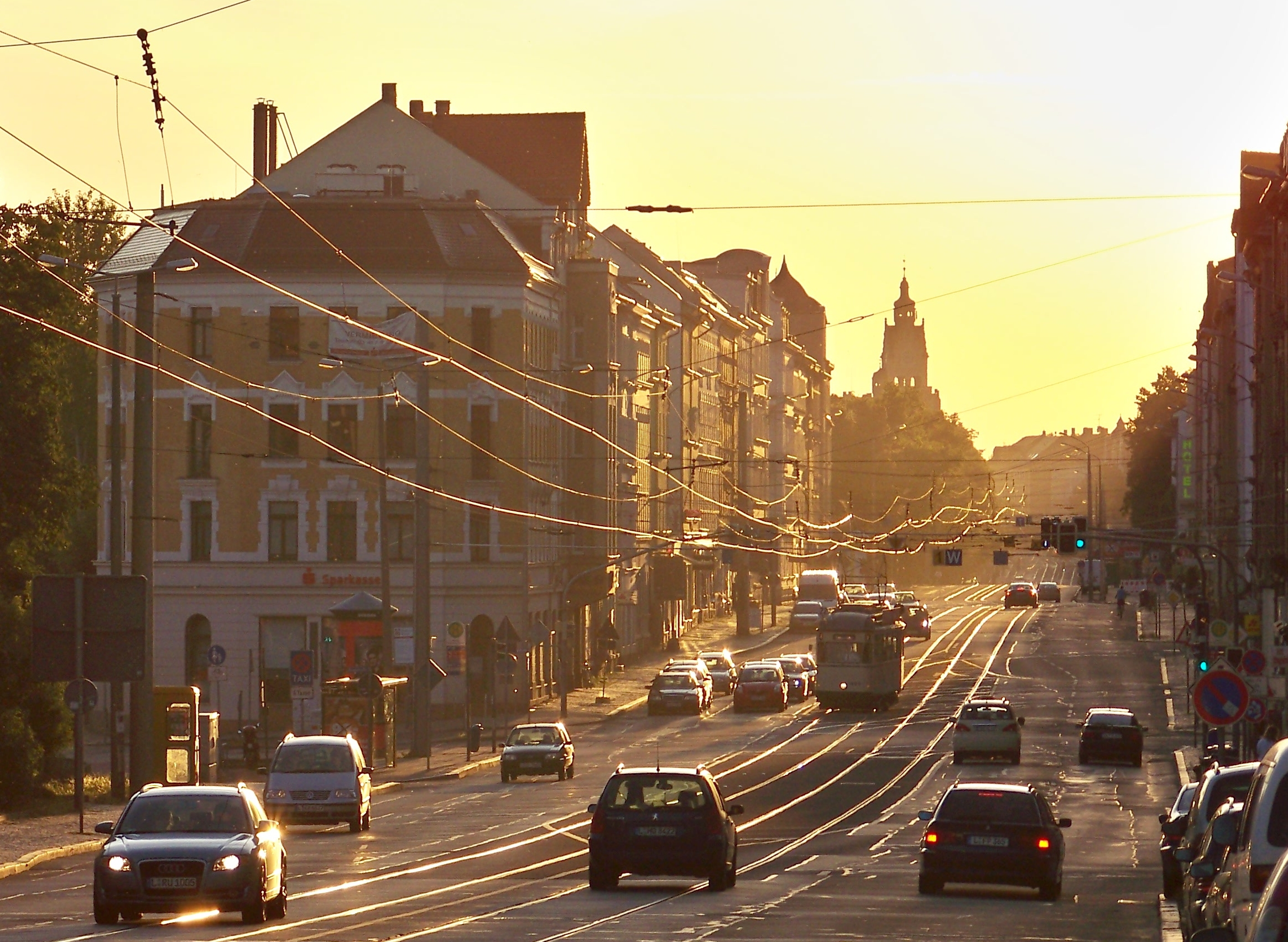
Tramsystem at the Georg-Schumann-Straße

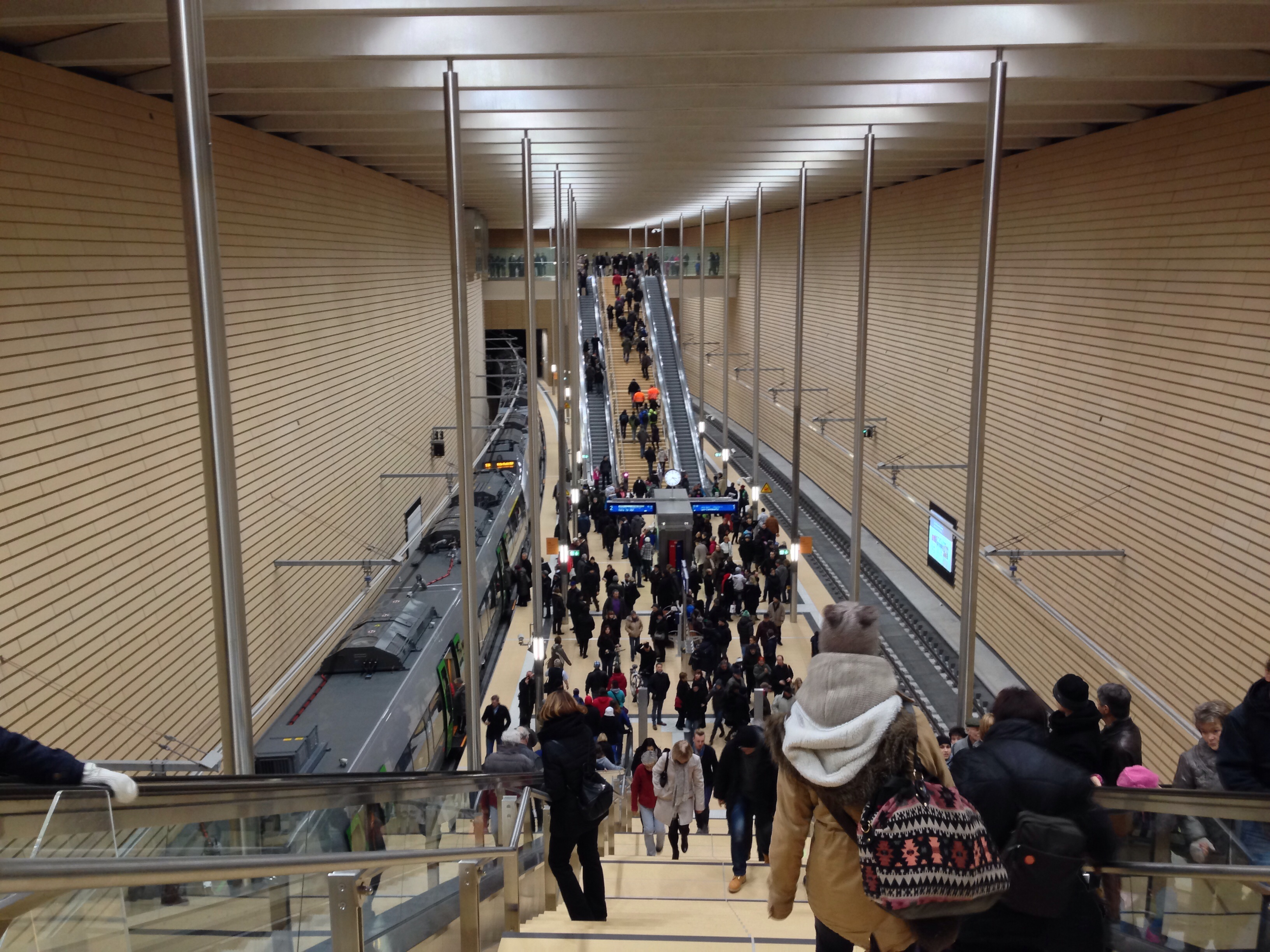
Leipzig City Tunnel, part of Leipzig's new S-Bahn network

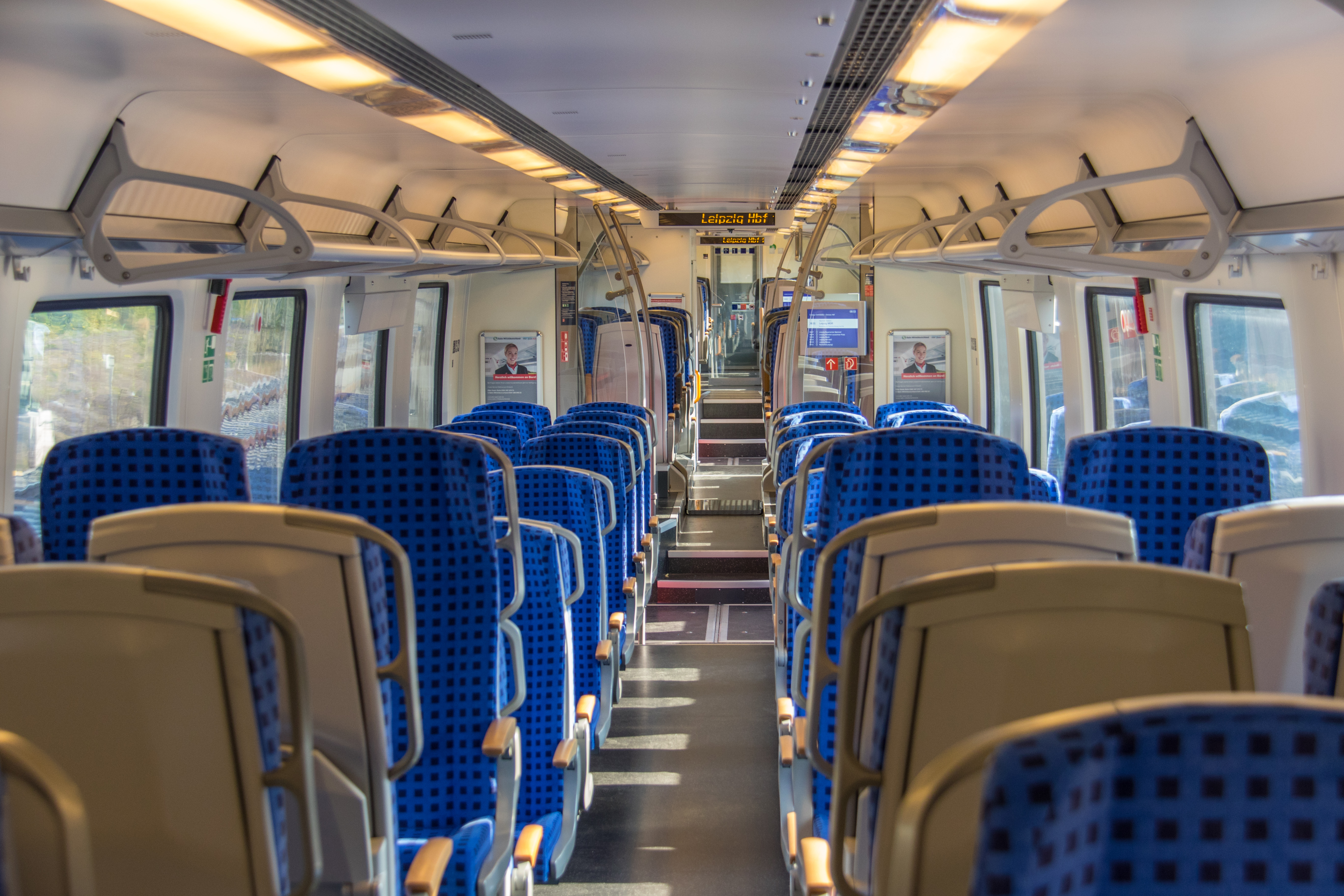
Inside the S-Bahn train

== Quotations ==
Mein Leipzig lob' ich mir! Es ist ein klein Paris und bildet seine Leute. ("I praise my Leipzig! It is a small Paris and educates its people.") – Frosch, a university student in Goethe's Faust, Part One

Ich komme nach Leipzig, an den Ort, wo man die ganze Welt im Kleinen sehen kann. ("I'm coming to Leipzig, to the place where one can see the whole world in miniature.") – Gotthold Ephraim Lessing

Extra Lipsiam vivere est miserrime vivere. ("To live outside Leipzig is to live miserably.") – Benedikt Carpzov the Younger

Das angenehme Pleis-Athen, Behält den Ruhm vor allen, Auch allen zu gefallen, Denn es ist wunderschön. ("The pleasurable Pleiss-Athens, earns its fame above all, appealing to every one, too, for it is mightily beauteous.") – Johann Sigismund Scholze

== Twin towns – sister cities ==
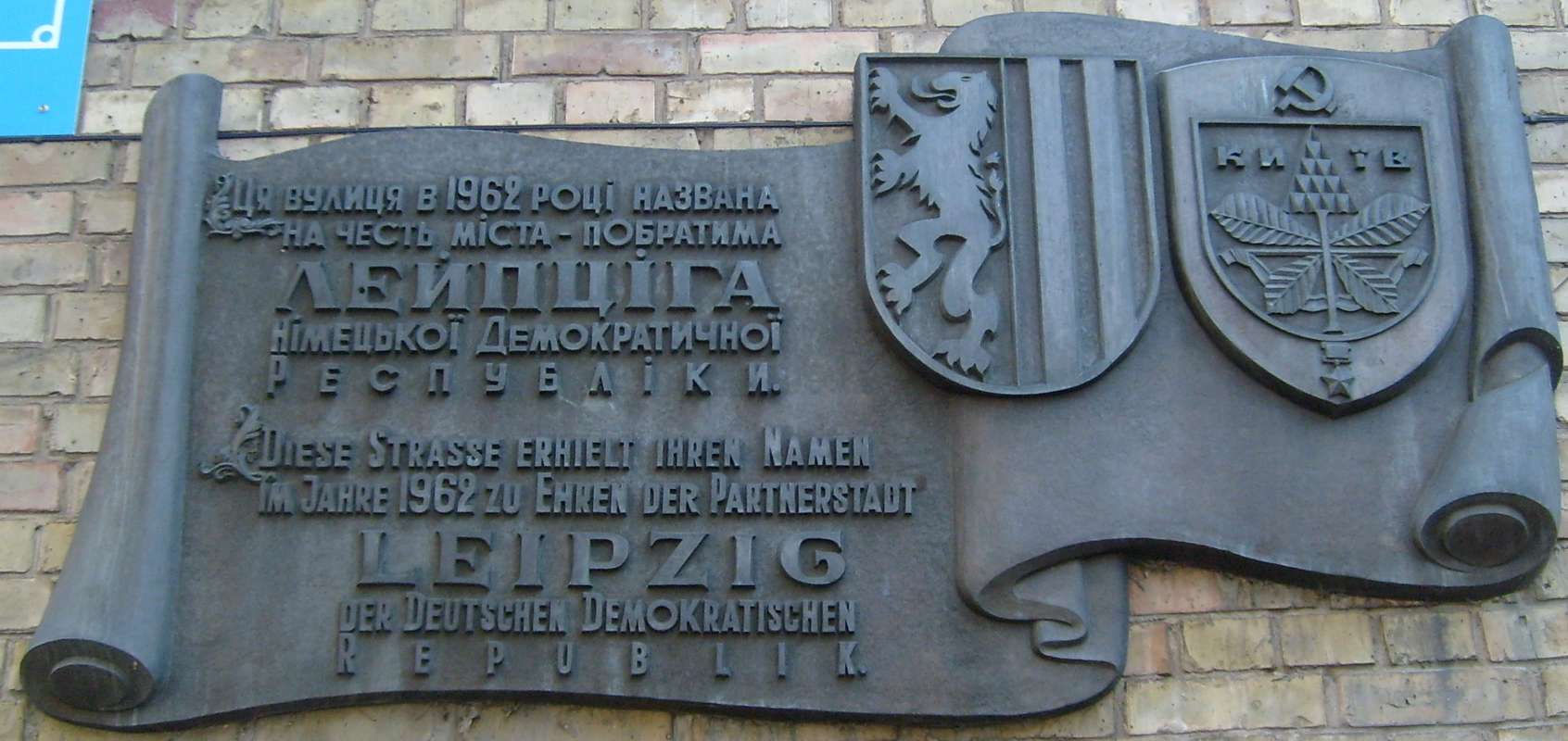
Plaque on Leipzig Street in Kyiv, one of Leipzig's twin towns

Leipzig is twinned with:

- Addis Ababa, Ethiopia (2004)
- Birmingham, United Kingdom (1992)
- Bologna, Italy (1962, renewed in 1997)
- Brno, Czech Republic (1973, renewed in 1999)
- Frankfurt, Germany (1990)
- Hanover, Germany (1987)
- Herzliya, Israel (2010)
- Ho Chi Minh City, Vietnam (2021)
- Houston, United States (1993)
- Kraków, Poland (1973, renewed in 1995)
- Kyiv, Ukraine (1961, renewed in 1992)
- Lyon, France (1981)
- Nanjing, China (1988)
- Thessaloniki, Greece (1984)
- Travnik, Bosnia and Herzegovina (2003)
- Yerevan, Armenia (2026)

== Notable people ==
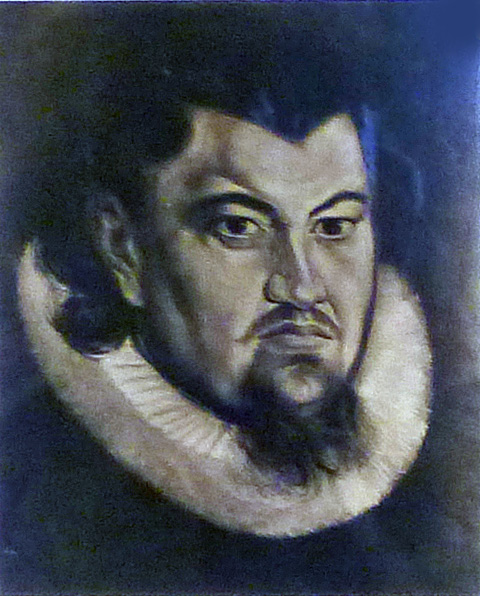
Nikolaus Krell

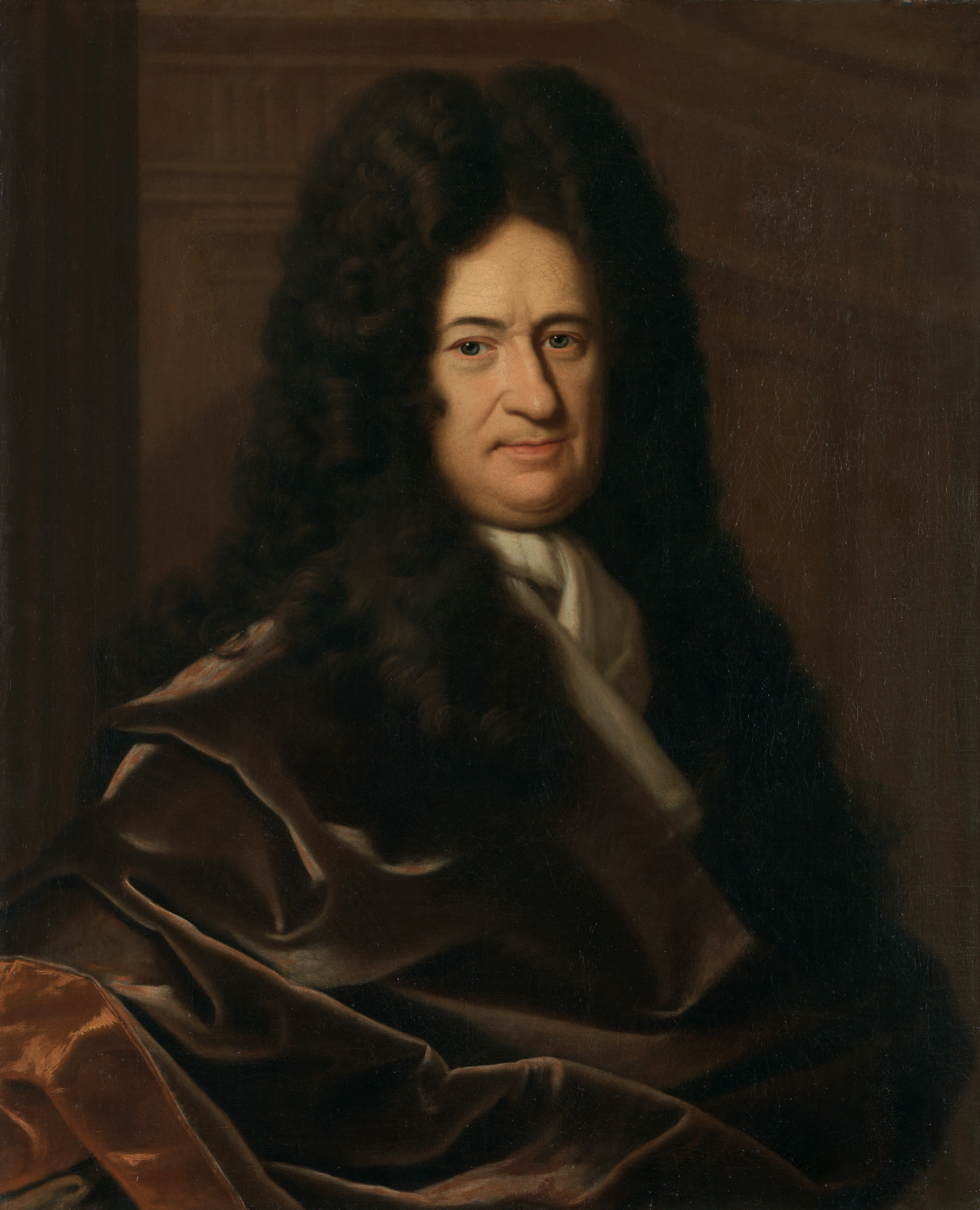
Gottfried Wilhelm Leibniz, 1695

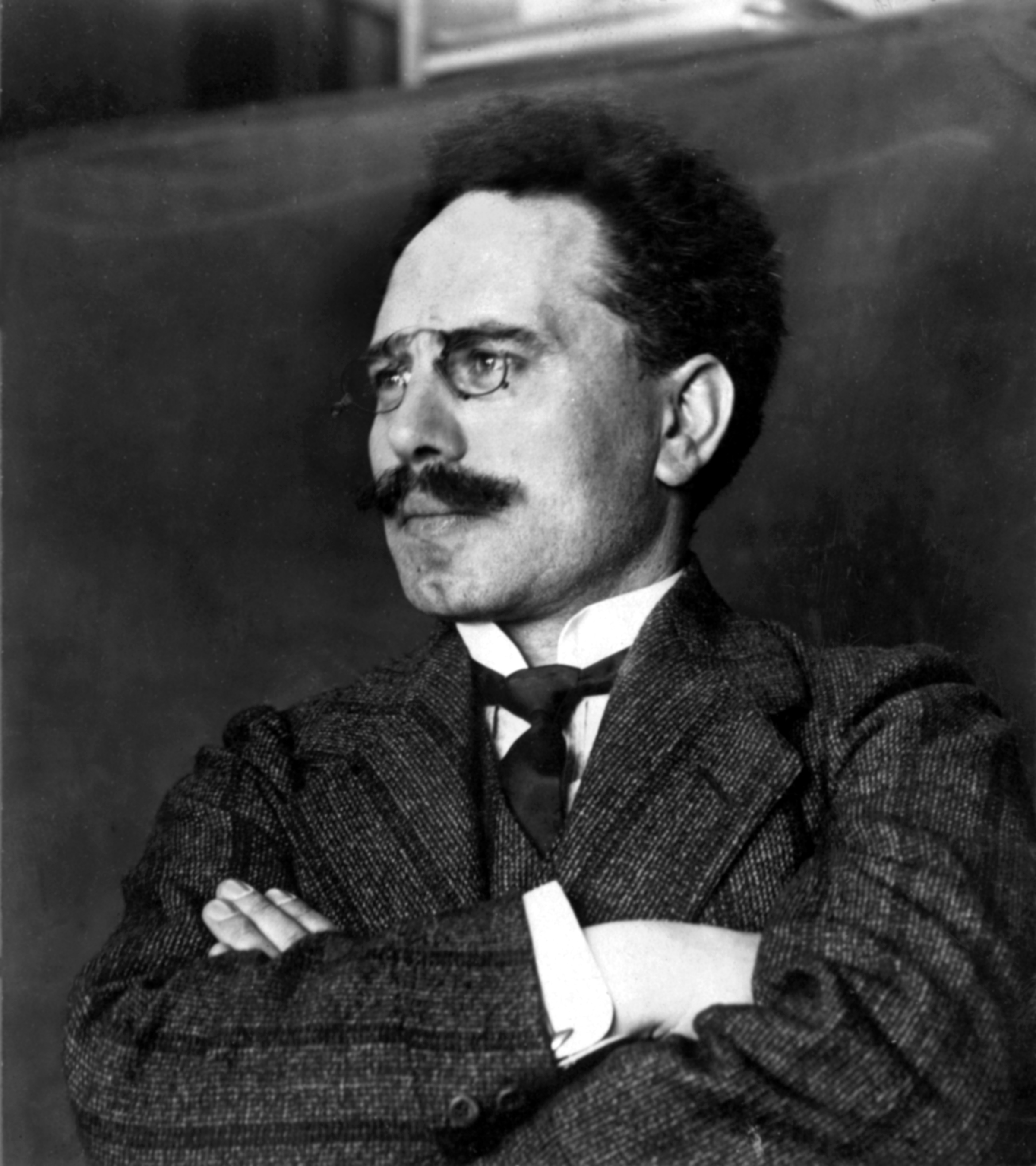
Karl Liebknecht, 1911

=== Politicians ===
- Nikolaus Krell (1551–1601), chancellor of the elector of Saxony
- Friedrich Karl Biedermann (1812–1901), professor, politician, and publisher
- Louise Otto-Peters (1819–1895), suffragette, founded the German Women's Association
- August Bebel (1840–1913), socialist politician, co-founder of Germany's SPD
- Karl Liebknecht (1871–1919), socialist, co-founded the Communist Party of Germany
- Carl Friedrich Goerdeler (1884–1945), mayor, a lead conservative resistance against Hitler
- Paul Frölich (1884–1953), politician, KPD co-founder, biographer of Rosa Luxemburg
- Walter Ulbricht (1893–1973), Communist politician, GDR chairman of the Council of State, 1960–1973
- Ruth Fischer (1895–1961), Communist politician and journalist, co-founder of the CPA
- Annemarie Renger (1919–2008), politician, president of the Bundestag, 1972–1976
- Käte Selbmann (1906–1962), teacher and Communist politician
- Matthias Moosdorf (born 1965), politician and cellist

=== Philosophers and theologians ===
- Gottfried Wilhelm Leibniz (1646–1716), philosopher, scientist, mathematician, and diplomat
- Johann Friedrich Mayer (1650–1712), Lutheran theologian
- Christian Thomasius (1655–1728), jurist and philosopher
- Wilhelm Abraham Teller (1734–1804), Protestant theologian with a rational approach
- Franz Delitzsch (1813–1890), Lutheran theologian and Hebraist
- Christian Daniel Beck (1757–1832), philologist, historian, theologian, and antiquarian
- Georg Benedikt Winer (1789–1858), Protestant theologian, known for linguistic studies of the New Testament
- Christian Hermann Weisse (1801–1866), Protestant theologian and philosopher
- Anton Westermann (1806–1869), German philologist

=== Writing and arts ===
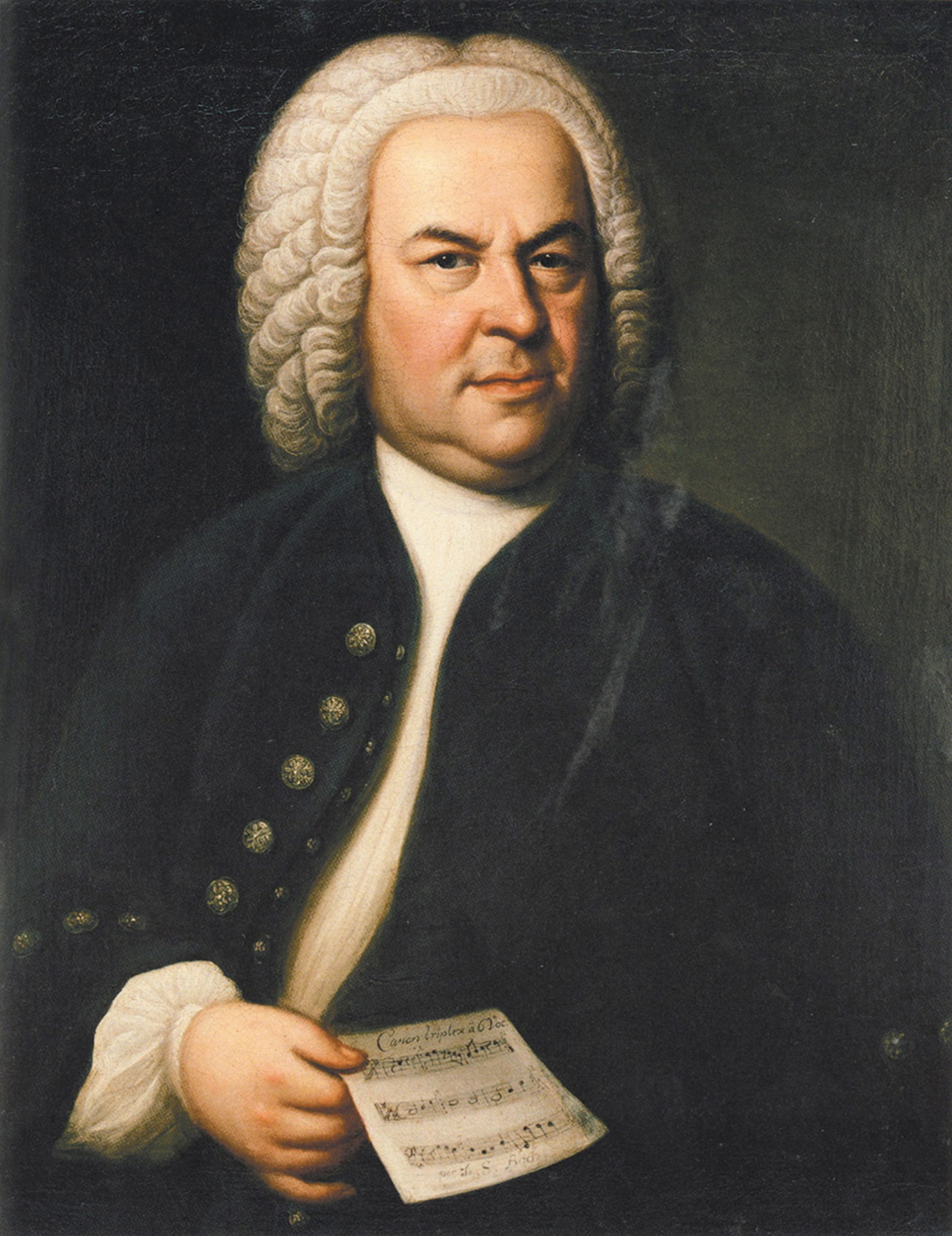
Johann Sebastian Bach

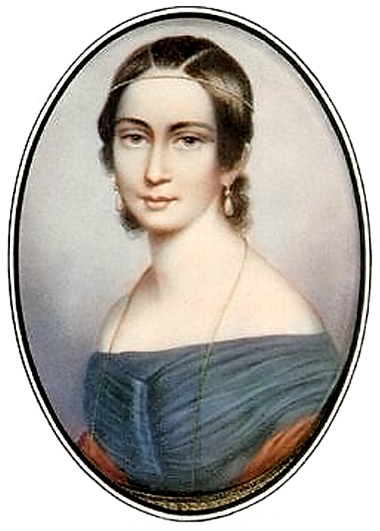
Clara Schumann, 1838

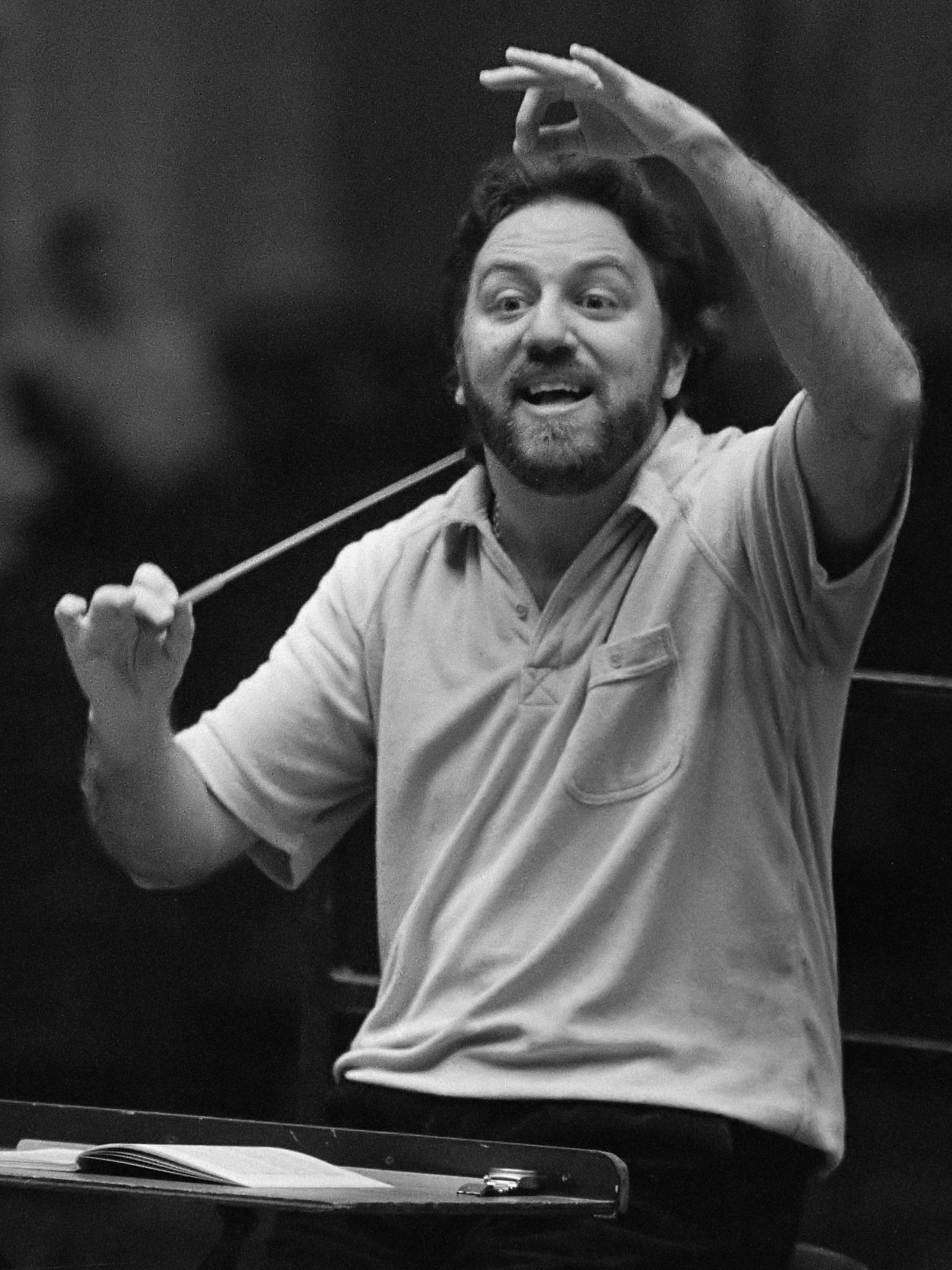
Riccardo Chailly, 1986

- Johann Albert Fabricius (1668–1736), classical scholar and bibliographer
- Johann Sebastian Bach (1685–1750), composer
- Johann Gottfried Donati (1706–1782), composer
- Carl Philipp Emanuel Bach (1714–1788), Classical period musician and composer
- Johann Christian Bach (1735–1782), composer, youngest son of Johann Sebastian Bach
- Christian Gottfried Körner (1756–1831), jurist and writer
- Friedrich Arnold Brockhaus (1772–1823), publisher; originated the Brockhaus encyclopedia
- Johann Gottfried Jakob Hermann (1772–1848), classical scholar and philologist
- Karl Wilhelm Dindorf (1802–1883), classical scholar
- Felix Mendelssohn (1809–1847), composer, pianist, organist, and conductor
- Robert Schumann (1810–1856), composer and music critic
- Roderich Benedix (1811–1873), dramatist and librettist
- Theodor Bergk (1812–1881), philologist, an authority on classical Greek poetry
- Richard Wagner (1813–1883), composer, theatre director, and conductor
- Clara Schumann (1819–1896), pianist and composer
- Carl Johann Lasch (1822–1888), painter
- Carl Reinecke (1824–1910), composer, conductor, and pianist
- Emma Kirchner (1830–1909), early German woman photographer who lived and worked in the Netherlands
- Oskar Lenz (1848–1925), explorer and travel writer
- Thekla Friedländer (born 1849), soprano and social reformer
- Hans Meyer (1858–1929), geographer, Africanist, and mountaineer
- Arthur Prüfer (1860–1944), musicologist
- Josef Liebeskind (1866–1916), composer, editor, translator, and collector
- Max Beckmann (1884–1950), expressionist painter, professor at art academies and schools
- Wilhelm Backhaus (1884–1969), pianist
- Karl Alfred Pabst (1884–1971), painter, graphic artist, and lithographer
- Bruno E. Werner (1896–1964), philologist, writer, and diplomat
- Hanns Eisler (1898–1962), composer of the national anthem of the GDR
- Bruno Apitz (1900–1979), writer
- Wolfgang Weber (1902–1985), photojournalist
- Hans Mayer (1907–2001), literary scholar
- Martin Broszat (1926–1989), historian, head of "Institut für Zeitgeschichte" in Munich
- Kurt Masur (1927–2015), conductor of the Leipzig Gewandhaus Orchestra
- Herbert Blomstedt (born 1927), conductor of the Leipzig Gewandhaus Orchestra
- Ruth Pfau (1929–2017), nun, physician, and writer
- Werner Tübke (1929–2004), painter
- Hans-Joachim Schulze (born 1934), Bach scholar
- Rolf Becker (1935–2025), actor
- Riccardo Chailly (born 1953), conductor of the Leipzig Gewandhaus Orchestra
- Neo Rauch (born 1960), painter
- Till Lindemann (born 1963), vocalist, lead singer of "Rammstein"
- Tobias Künzel (born 1964), singer and musician
- Simone Thomalla (born 1965), actress
- Sebastian Krumbiegel (born 1966), singer and musician
- Matthias Weischer (born 1973), painter
- Bill Kaulitz (born 1989), singer, songwriter, and musician
- Tom Kaulitz (born 1989), guitarist and musician

=== Science and business ===
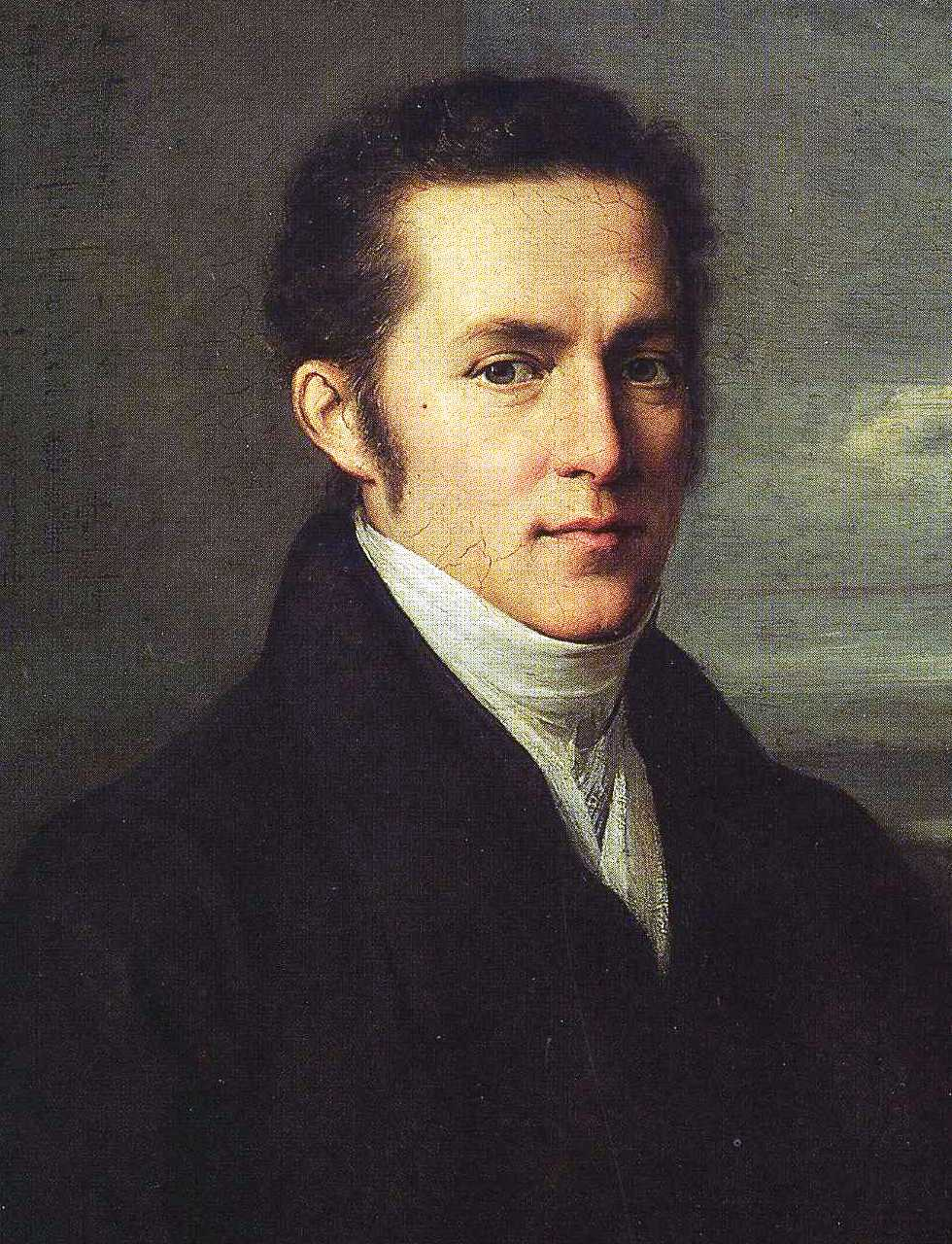
Carl Gustav Carus, 1800

- Michael Ettmüller (1644–1683), physician
- Augustus Quirinus Rivinus (1652–1723), physician and botanist
- Friedrich Boerner (1723–1761), physician
- Carl Gustav Carus (1789–1869), doctor, painter, and natural philosopher
- Wilhelm Hofmeister (1824–1877), biologist and botanist
- Paul Mendelssohn Bartholdy (1841–1880), chemist
- Karl Wittgenstein (1847–1913), entrepreneur
- Kurt Herrmann (1888–1959), architect, publisher, and entrepreneur
- Bernard Katz FRS (1911–2003), Nobel prizewinning physician and biophysicist
- Sibylle Kemmler-Sack (1934–1999), chemist

=== War figures ===
- Elfriede Rinkel (1922–2018), warden of a concentration camp during the Nazi dictatorship
- Karl Eberhard Schöngarth (1903–1946), SS officer and war criminal, executed in Hamelin
- Wilhelm Souchon (1864–1946), admiral in World War I

=== Sport ===
- Karl Rudolf Heydel (1911–1936), racing driver
- Marvin Kirchhöfer (born 1994), racing driver
- René Müller (born 1959), footballer
- Kristin Otto (born 1966), swimmer, six-time Olympic gold medalist, and sports journalist
- Arthur Saxon (born 1871), strongman, circus performer, world's strongest man
- Tony Schmidt (born 1980), racing driver
- Rita Wilden (born 1947), sprinter

== See also ==
- History of the Jews in Leipzig
- List of mayors of Leipzig
