= Hegemann =

Hegemann is a German surname. Notable people with the surname include:

- Clara Hegemann (born 2007), German hammer thrower
- Dietfried Müller-Hegemann (1910–1989), German physician
- Dimitri Hegemann (born 1954), German nightclub owner and activist
- Elizabeth Compton Hegemann (1897–1962), American photographer
- Helene Hegemann (born 1992), German writer, director and actress
- Marta Hegemann (1894–1970), German artist
- Peter Hegemann (born 1954), German biophysicist
- Werner Hegemann (1881–1936, German city planner and architecture critic
