= Lene Voigt =

German writer and poet

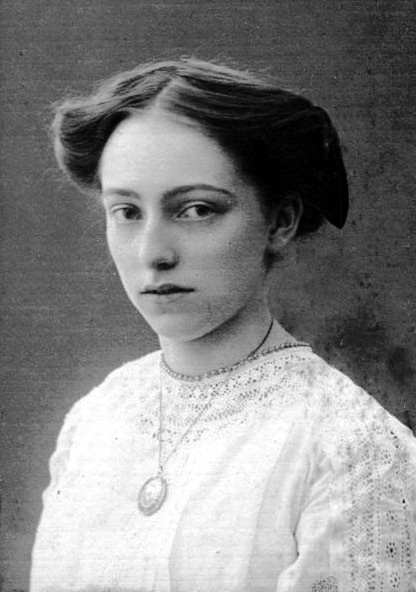
- Lene Voigt ca. 1910
- Born: Helene Alma Wagner; 2 May 1891; Leipzig, Saxony, Germany
- Died: 16 June 1962; Leipzig-Dosen, East Germany
- Occupations: writer German language & Upper Saxon dialect
- Spouse: Friedrich Otto Voigt
- Children: Alfed Voigt (1919-1924)
- Parent(s): Karl Bruno Wagner (1873-1917); Alma Maria Pleißner (1860-1924)

Signature
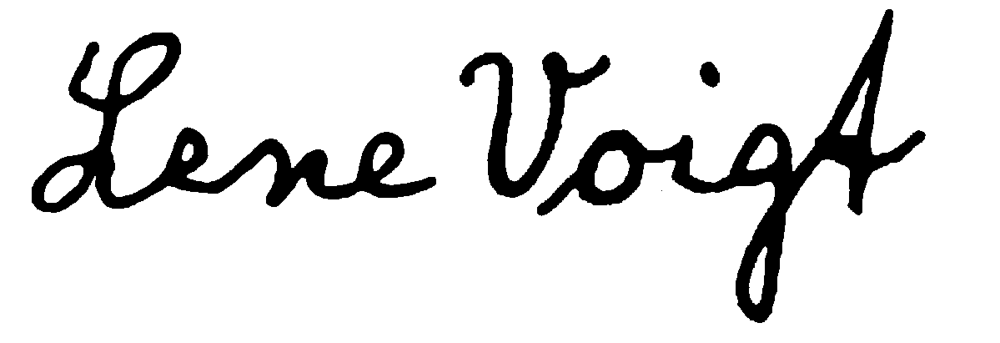

Lene Voigt (born Helene Wagner: 2 May 1891 - 16 June 1962) was a German writer and poet. Although some of her earlier work employed standard "Hochdeutsch" German, she is better remembered today for her poetry and prose texts written in the Upper Saxon dialect.

After 1945 her home city of Leipzig found itself in what became, in 1949, the German Democratic Republic (East Germany). For various reasons Voigt's work disappeared from the shelves during the National Socialist years: her hopes that it would return to the magazines and bookshops after 1945 were dashed. It is widely thought that this was, at least in part, because her Upper Saxon dialect writing was seen in some quarters as disrespectful. Walter Ulbricht, the national leader between 1949 and 1971, also came from Leipzig, which meant that the dialect and accent of Saxony were the dialect and accent of the leader. In West Germany, across the internal border, her work was again published during the 1950s, and after Walter Ulbricht left the stage it also experienced a revival in East Germany, where a particularly effective cheer leader was (and post-reunification remains) the cabaret artiste and impresario Gisela Oechelhaeuser.

== Life ==
=== Provenance ===
Helene "Lene" Alma Wagner was born at her grandmother's home in Leipzig. The circumstances of her birth may have contributed to subsequent confusion as to its precise date. Her mother had already given birth in 1887 and again in 1888, but the first son had been born dead and the second died after three hours. The understandable anxiety accompanying Helene's birth meant that she was subjected to an "emergency baptism" on the day she was born. Her godparents were her mother's sister and grandmother along with a theology student who may also have been a maternal relative. The doctors gave the parents little reason to hope that their baby daughter might survive, but survive she did.

Her parents had married in Leipzig in 1887. Her mother, born Alma Maria Pleißner (1860-1924), came from an academic family. She always spoke standard "Hochdeutsch" German and was uncompromising in her insistence that Lene should do the same. Lene inherited something of her mother's critical approach to life. While her husband was alive Alma Maria Wagner stayed at home and looked after the little family. Later she was employed as a housekeeper. By the time she died she was living in a "poor house" ("Armenstift"). Lene's father, Karl Bruno Wagner (1873-1917), worked as a typesetter. Lene later wrote that he came from a "family of mountain peasants" ("Gebirgsbauerngeschlecht"). From her father Lene inherited a talent for humour. He liked to use the local dialect. Sources indicate that Lene probably also inherited from her father a tendency to suffer with Depression and Psychoses. Karl Wagner drowned in 1917 when he was just 54.

=== Childhood ===
She grew up in Leipzig. The family moved house several times while she was still small. Lene Wagner was a wild child and something of a prankster. For six years she attended school locally: she excelled academically, especially in lessons on Religion. Then, at her mother's wish, between 1905 and 1910 she attended a training establishment for Kindergarten work. Her interests lay in another direction, however. By the time she was 15 she had started to write poetry. In the end she undertook an apprenticeship for work in the book trade. Her childhood seems to have involved the omnipresence of relatives: aunts, in particular, were always in the background. The family was evidently a close-knit one. She loved to read, later naming the Viennese novelist-poet Ludwig Anzengruber as the favourite author of her childhood years. It was presumably from Anzengruber that she learned to identify social and political issues, and how to present them with humour. After she grew up Lene Voigt also recalled a period of her childhood when she was sent away to live with a church minister in a small mining village in the Erzgebirgischer mountain region, near the border with Bohemia and to the south of Leipzig. Precisely when, where and why she was sent to the mountains is unclear, but the arrangement was, in any case, temporary.

=== Employment ===
As was usual in working-class families at the time, Lene's childhood was all too brief. According to several sources she left her parents' home as soon as she could. She was only 12 when she took work as a courier for a dolls' clinic, collecting dolls in need of attention and returning them to their homes following repair. This involved a very small girl walking the streets of Leipzig with an implausibly large basket. She was later able to recall the image and joke about it, but the work itself was perfectly serious. After she had been persuaded by her mother to enroll at an academy for Kindergarten work, between 1903 and approximately 1905 she worked as a nanny for a prosperous family. As part of the work, she used to create puppetry games to keep the children amused. It was the "background humour" incorporated in one of these puppetry games that led to her dismissal.

There followed a succession of jobs in Leipzig. At one stage she took an office job with the Teubner publishing business, and in 1912 she joined the Köhler Book wholesale traders (" Barsortiment Köhler").

=== Family tragedy ===
After at least two "disappointing relationships with men", on 19 or 24 September Helene Wagner married Friedrich Otto Voigt. He was an orchestral musician who played in the Paul Lincke Orchestra, and the marriage took place in the St. Thomas Church. Unfortunately war had broken out at the end of July, and after the marriage ceremony Voigt was almost immediately conscripted into the army. He returned from the war alive but missing an arm, which put an end to his musical career. Between 1917 and the end of February 1919 Lene Voigt was employed as a sales representative by Insel Verlag (publishers): her departure was greatly regretted by Anton Kippenberg, the head of the business. The birth of her son, Alfred on 10 September 1919 provides a clue as to the reason for her resignation from Insel. The marriage ended in divorce in 1920. Nevertheless, Lene remained in touch with Voigt, and later on good terms with his second family, for the rest of her life.

By 1923 Lene Voigt was working for the foreign trade subsidiary of "Barsortiment Köhler", which collapsed in August of that year. This turned out to have been her last experience of full-time employment. She now became a "Geistesarbeiterin" which was a contemporary euphemism for self-employment.

=== Bereavements ===
Living alone and without permanent work, Lene Voigt faced a compounding tragedy on 6 February 1924 when Alfed died from Tubercular Meningitis. He was not quite five. She tried to work through her grief by writing.

Happiness of a kind returned at some point between 1926 1928 when she teamed up with Karl Geil, an unemployed anarchist and opera singer. He described Voigt as the one great love of his life. Geil was married to someone else, but lived apart from his wife. He was a member of a progressive movement known as the "Vagabond Brotherhood" which involved a rather itinerant lifestyle. For a year or so from 1928 the meetings between Geil and Vogt became progressively less frequent, although they maintained an intensely passionate relationship by letter. In January 1929 Voigt's worst fears were confirmed: Karl Geil was more seriously sick than he could admit to himself. He collapsed unexpectedly on a street in Dresden and was taken to hospital where on 19 January 1929 he died as the result of a stroke. It took considerable effort for Voigt to have his ashes returned from Dresden to Leipzig. The deaths within a few years first of her child and then of her lover plunged her into severe depression which would haunt her for the rest of her life.

Friends advised a new start. Later in 1929 Voigt moved to the northern port city of Bremen, an industrial hub with a seething political and cultural energy. She arrived with little more than a typewriter and a small suitcase. The next few years were some of her most productive. Some of her best known books date from this period. She also benefited from frequent visits from Robert Meier, an admirer twelve years her junior who became a lifelong friend. Many of her texts, including some that never found a publisher, have survived only because she sent copies to Meier, and Meier took good care of them.

=== Success followed by dictatorship ===
Until the Hitler government took power Lene Voigt now enjoyed a hitherto unfamiliar level of financial security. The rapid transition to one-party dictatorship during 1933 changed that. Even after 1933 her books failed to follow the official orthodoxies. Her humour was not to the liking of the authorities. She became an object of government suspicion and a target for Gestapo surveillance. She herself became increasingly unsettled, relocating to Lübeck in 1934 and to Flensburg in 1935. For a long time she lived only in rented furnished apartments.

=== "Nicht sächsisch, sondern jiddisch" ===
One respect in which the Hitler government was keen for Germany to catch up with Britain and France involved centralsing state power. Government strategy extended well beyond replacing Germany's former administrative structure. In Saxony Martin Mutschmann, the regional governor ("Gauleiter") established the "Heimatwerk Sachsen – Verein zur Förderung des sächsischen Volkstums e. V." (loosely, "...association for promoting Saxon popular culture and identity") in 1936. The idea was to take control of all regional cultural aspirations and redirect them in support of party goals. The "Heimatwerk Sachsen" existed till 1945, intended to inspire the entire region of Saxony to identify with the National Socialist state. As part of this mission, the "Heimatwerk Sachsen" banned the Upper Saxon dialect. There was no longer any place for "Saxon comedy, joke makers and jewifying literati" , (Note: "Sachsenkomiker, Witzefabrikanten und verjüdelte Literaten") which had simply led to "mutilation of the language in Saxony" ("Verschandelung der sächsischen Sprache"). Lene Voigt was expressly identified as part of the problem. Upper Saxon dialect literature was "unheroic": it was almost all pulped.

The Ministry of Public Enlightenment and Propaganda placed a nationwide ban on further publication of Voigt's books. The security services were only too well aware that she not only wrote texts using Upper Saxon dialect, but that before 1933 she had also worked with politically left-leaning publications and that she had openly asserted her atheism. Voigt did not react robustly to the increasingly threatening situation in which she now found herself. Intensified surveillance, proscription, the publishing ban and the resulting economic hardship led her to a form of psychosis. Between 18 May and 15 June 1936 she was placed in a mental hospital in Schleswig for the treatment of mental instability and hallucinations. When she was released it was "without mental disorder". She herself diagnosed her illness as stemming from delusions of persecution. That may have been necessary to secure her release, but at least one commentator has questioned her use of the word "delusion" in this context.

It is not known why Lene Voigt relocated to Munich in 1937, but her reasons for leaving the city are apparent: the newspaper of the local Nazi paramilitaries (SA) launched a press campaign against her, ostensibly in connection with an Upper Saxon dialect card-game. In or before 1938 she relocated to Hamburg and then to Berlin where she lived till 1940.

In 1934 Lene Voigt had acquired a second home in Leipzig, and she had held on to it during the ensuing six years. In 1940 she was therefore able to return to the city of her birth. War had returned to central Europe at the end of the previous summer, and she was now conscripted for a form of national service obligation ("Dienstverpflichtung"). That involved working for the Giesecke+Devrient specialist printing company which at that time had its main business in Leipzig. Later she was sent to work as an invoicing clerk with Lange & Meuche Verlag, which was part of the Rothbarth publishing conglomerate. She also spent time as an in-patient at Leipzig University Mental Clinic during 1940. More precise details of how, why and when are not available due to the subsequent wartime destruction of her medical records.

=== Soviet occupation zone ===
The U.S. 2nd Infantry Division and U.S. 69th Infantry Division reached Leipzig in April 1945 and completed its capture after "fierce urban action". By this time, however. President Roosevelt, Prime Minister Churchill and Marshal Stalin had already agreed a postwar military settlement for the western two thirds of Germany which would divide the territory into four separate occupation zones. Under the agreement Leipzig was to be administered as part of the Soviet occupation zone. Accordingly, in July 1945 the United States army withdrew from the city and Soviet forces moved in. By this time both the publishing firms who had published Voigt's work before the National Socialists had banned it had moved what remained of their businesses from Leipzig to Munich, which had ended up under American military occupation.

With the twelve year National Socialist period at an end, Lene Voigt might hope for better times ahead, and indeed her texts were included in "Die Rampe", Leipzig's first postwar cabaret show. Sadly, there would be no large-scale return to the popular mainstream, however. She overworked herself, worried about the future, and forgot to eat enough, at one stage weighing just 38.3 kg (84 lb). She was also suffering with climacteric issues. Reports of hallucinations and signs of mental instability led to a diagnosis (subsequently corrected) of "Schizophrenic episodes" and re-admission to the University Mental Clinic on 11 June 1946. She remained there for fourteen days and was probably subjected to the conventional remedies of the time: Electroconvulsive therapy, Barbiturates and physical restraints ("Netzbehandlung"). The University Mental Clinic into which she was admitted in 1946 was not the one in which she had been treated in 1940, however. That had been destroyed by an air attack in 1943: provision had been rehoused. In 1945 there were 200 beds available for psychiatry and neurology treatment which was completely inadequate. In the summer of 1946, when Lene Voigt was admitted, 25 cases were being refused admission every day. Inside the Soviet occupation zone hospitals were experiencing food shortages and shortages of heating fuel that were in many cases measurably worse than during the war years. Many of the doctors, nurses and other specialists still had not returned from the war, while others who were in Leipzig were still unable to work, pending denazification processing. Due to the shortage of capacity at the University Clinic Voigt was transferred, on 26 June 1946, to the Saxony-Altscherbitz District Hospital ("Landesheilanstalt Altscherbitz"): gradually her condition improved and she returned to her writing. She was discharged on 24 February 1947. She was lucky. The Saxony-Altscherbitz District Hospital was a specialist establishment for psychiatric and nervous disorders which even by the standards of the time and place had a terrible record. A later study determined that during 1947 887 patients accommodated in the institution - equivalent to 38% of all patients - died as a result of deficiencies in the care provided ("aufgrund der Mangelversorgung").

One of the poems Voigt wrote shortly before her discharge in February 1947 was entitled "Wir 'armen Irren'" (loosely, "We, 'poor lunatics'"). Coming across this work prompted Dietfried Müller-Hegemann (1910-1989), one of the hospital physicians who had overseen her treatment, to investigate Voigt's case further and to correct the "Schizophrenic episodes" diagnosis which had led to her hospitalisation the previous June. It was now determined that in response to the exceptionally burdensome life events to which she had been subjected, she had become ill with repeating "Reactive Psychosis" (wiederholt "Reaktive Psychose"). In 1966, after he had retired from the hospital (and after Lene Voigt herself had died), Müller-Hegemann published a "Textbook for psychiatry and neurology" in which he wrote up the case in some detail. Although he did not name his patient, he did include sufficient details to identify her beyond all reasonable doubt. As a result, among several generations of students and practitioners of Psychiatric Medicine Lene Voigt became as well known (or better known) as the subject of a celebrated case study as she was as a published author and poet of German-language and Upper Saxon dialect texts.

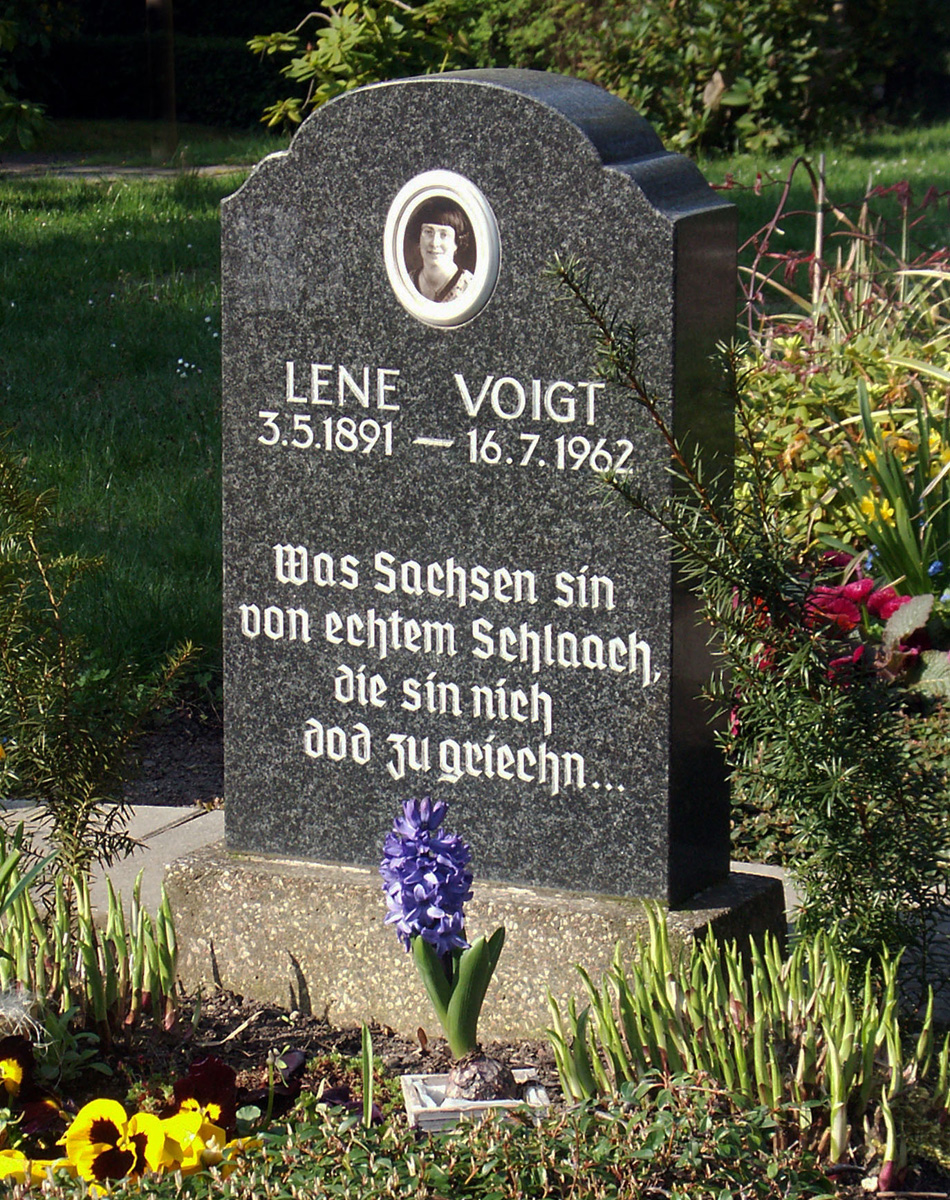
Voigt's gravestone memorial at the Südfriedhof (South Cemetery) in Leipzig states her birth date incorrectly. According to the Lene Voigt Foundation, current knowledge confirms that she was born on 2 May 1891.

Between 1947 and 1949 Lene Voigt worked in the Food Ration Cards department for the Leipzig region. Little is known of her life circumstances during this time.

=== Institutionalised ===
On 6 July 1949 Voigt was admitted into the Leipzig-Dosen District Psychiatric Clinic. Notes made at the time of her admission suggest manic aspects to her behaviour. She "danced waltzes in front of the admitting physician and reportedly hallucinated and gave out paranoid utterances". (Note: " ... tanzte Walzer vor dem aufnehmenden Arzt, soll auch halluziniert und paranoide Ideen geäußert haben ... ") By August 1949 the acute phase of her condition had subsided, but she expressed reluctance to leave the hospital because she thought she might be unable to manage with life's daily demands if she were to go back to living on her own. Instead the hospital administrators employed her as a live-in document courier. The hospital's "pavilion-based" layout ensured a continuing need for documents to be delivered from one building to another. This provided her with the necessary measure of security. She began to make regular visit to the city centre and she also resumed her writing. Hospital administrators from that time would remember her as an exceptionally well read woman with an intense interest in current events and a strong willingness to engage in conversation. She was generous in giving away her own written pieces, which by this time were frequently handwritten.

Lene Voigt lived at the hospital in Leipzig-Dosen for thirteen years. She was regarded as a reliable employee. The only wish she expressed consistently was that she might end her days at the Fritz Austel Retirement Home. The hospital management backed her in this. However, on 16 July 1962 she died in the hospital wing of the District Psychiatric Clinic. Her death was almost entirely overlooked at the time when it happened, apart from a two line announcement in the local newspaper. It was only in 1985 that a gravestone was placed over her grave, and only in 2002 that her remains were disinterred and reburied with other distinguished citizens in the "Artists' Section" ("Künstlerabteilung") of the Leipzig Südfriedhof (South Cemetery).

== Works ==
Lene Wagner was fifteen when, in 1906, her first published contribution, a "gymnastics society humoresque", was published in "Der Leipziger". In 1913 she became a regular contributor to the "Leipziger Hausfrau" newspaper, and in 1914, for the first time, her work was included in a book. The book was an anthology entitled "Dichtung und Prosa von Leipziger Frauen" ("Poetry and Prose by Leipzig Women"). Over the next few years she continued to contribute regularly both to "Der Leipziger" and to "Leipziger Hausfrau": her pieces were generally in the entertainment genre, and often used the Upper Saxon dialect. In 1920 she receives her first mention in the Kürschners Deutscher Literatur-Kalender: her entry in the biennial biographical directory (of German writers) mentions her membership of the ASV (national writers' association) and describes her as an author of sketches, satires and Upper Saxon dialect poetry. What she wrote was not merely entertaining, nor even just satirical-political: Voigt made no secret of her sympathy for the recently formed Communist Party (though there are no indications that she ever became a party member). She contributed pieces to "Die Rote Fahne" ("... Red Flag), the party newspaper. From 1921 she also wrote for "Der Drache" ("... Dragon"), a satirical magazine, and for the "Sächsische Arbeiterzeitung" ("... Workers' Newspaper"). Between 1923 and 1926 she was also writing for the "Proletarische Heimstunden", a short-lived anti-militarist magazine, her work displaying a style of casual inconsequential humorous journalism that rapidly disappeared after 1933 and has never really returned.

More recent studies of Lene Voigt tend to focus only on her better known works: Upper Saxon dialect variants of ballads and other literary classics. These are not simply "translations" into Saxon. The well calibrated humour of the author endows them, frequently, with a less heroic and a more human tone than the German-language original versions.

Lene Voigt's reputation was at its height between the middle 1920s and the early 1930s. She worked for a number of newspapers and magazines in Saxony, but her much work could be read across Germany and indeed in German language newspapers further afield. She felt a particular affinity with the magazine "Der gemütliche Sachse" (in 1929 renamed "Der lustige Sachse") and over time became its principal contributor. A first Phonograph record#78 rpm disc developments appeared featuring Voigt's anecdites, poems, skits and parodies - not all of them just in dialect. It proved successful and lucrative. Books were published, collecting her dialect poems and prose texts together: "Säk'sche Balladen" (1925), "Säk'sche Glassigger" (1925), "Mir Sachen. Lauter gleenes Zeich zum Vortragen" (2 volumes, 1928), *In Sachsen gewachsen" (1932), "Die sächsische Odyssee" (1933) and "Leibzcher Lindenblieten" (1935). Alongside these dialect works, she also published the autobiographical narrative "Mally der Familienschreck (1927)" and a travel novel, "Vom Pleißestrand nach Helgoland" (1934) in German before the publication ban came into effect.

Except at the most acute phases of her illness Lene Voigt never stopped writing, even after 1949 when the Soviet occupation zone was relaunched as the German Democratic Republic (East Germany), and she herself moved into the Psychiatric Clinic where she would spend her final thirteen years. However, during those final years she was no longer paid for any of her writing, because with the country under the direction of the relentlessly unamused (and Saxon) First Secretary Ulbricht, any "Saxon utterance" risked being interpreted by the authorities as a form of mockery. During the Ulbricht years just one Lene Voigt poem - which she had sent to a newspaper as a "reader's letter" - was published. Astonishingly, she was never forgotten by people in Saxony, however.

In West Germany new editions of her compilations "Balladen" and "Glassigger" did appear in the 1950s, but the author received no money, nor even a copy. Worse than that, thanks to the Cold War divisions of the time, and the growing impenetrability of the border between the two Germanys, she was not even aware of these new editions of her work. In East Germany, after Ulbricht died (and so more than ten years after Voigt's own death) her work did reappear in the press during the mid 1970s. Then, in 1982, a Voigt book appeared in her homeland: "Bargarohle, Bärchschaft und sächs'sches Ginsdlrblut" presented a cross-section of her life's work, including magazine contributions, dialect works and satirical pieces. A second volume followed in 1984. As East Germany approached its own time of decisive changes the focus of editors tended increasingly to concentrate on Voigt's more overtly political texts.

In 1978/79 Rowohlt Verlag acquired the publishing rights to "Balladen" and "Glassigger" which have enjoyed unbroken popularity in West Germany, and since 1990 Germany, ever since.

== Revival and the Lene Voigt Society ==
During the 1980s and 1990s, to the extent that she had ever been forgotten, Lene Voigt was rediscovered, especially in the eastern part of Germany. Wolfgang U. Schütte, in particular, undertook and from 1983 published new research work. Further information and insights into Voigt's life became available only after 1990. Since 1990 there has been an emergence of so-called Ostalgie, whereby people express nostaligia for what was good about the German Democratic Republic (1949-1989) without (in most cases) seeking to downplay the political repression and economic failings that led to its collapse. Part of "Ostalgie" has been a booming interest in political cabaret which before totalitarianism was always more celebrated in the central industrial cities such as Berlin and Leipzig than further west. Three stars and scholars from he world of cabaret in Leipzig who have shown particular commitment to reviving the poetry and lyrics written by Lene Voigt are Bernd-Lutz Lange, Tom Pauls and Gisela Oechelhaeuser.

The Lene Voigt Society ("Lene-Voigt-Gesellschaft") was founded in 1995 in Leipzig is a particular focus of commitment to discovering more aboud Lene Voigt's life and work. It has taken responsibility in respect of a number of publications on Voigt including, not leastly, a six volume compilation of her own works. The non-profit organisation has followed in her tracks and, in particular, worked to identify and draw attention to all the many Leipzig apartments and other homes and institutions in which she lived during a somewhat unsettled life. As researches are pursued, it often turns out that earlier details of Voigt's life have been incorrectly recorded, and one of the Lene Voigt Society objectives is to promote the publication of a new biography to build on Wolfgang Schütte's 1983 with all the additional information that has come to light - not leastly through Schütte's own efforts - while eliminating those errors that remain in the public arena.

== Honors ==
On 13 July 2005 a new created park on the refurbished site of the former train station Leipzig Eilenburger Bahnhof was named Lene Voigt Park.

== See also ==
- Saxon Psychiatric Museum
