= Lene Voigt Park =

Park in Leipzig, Germany

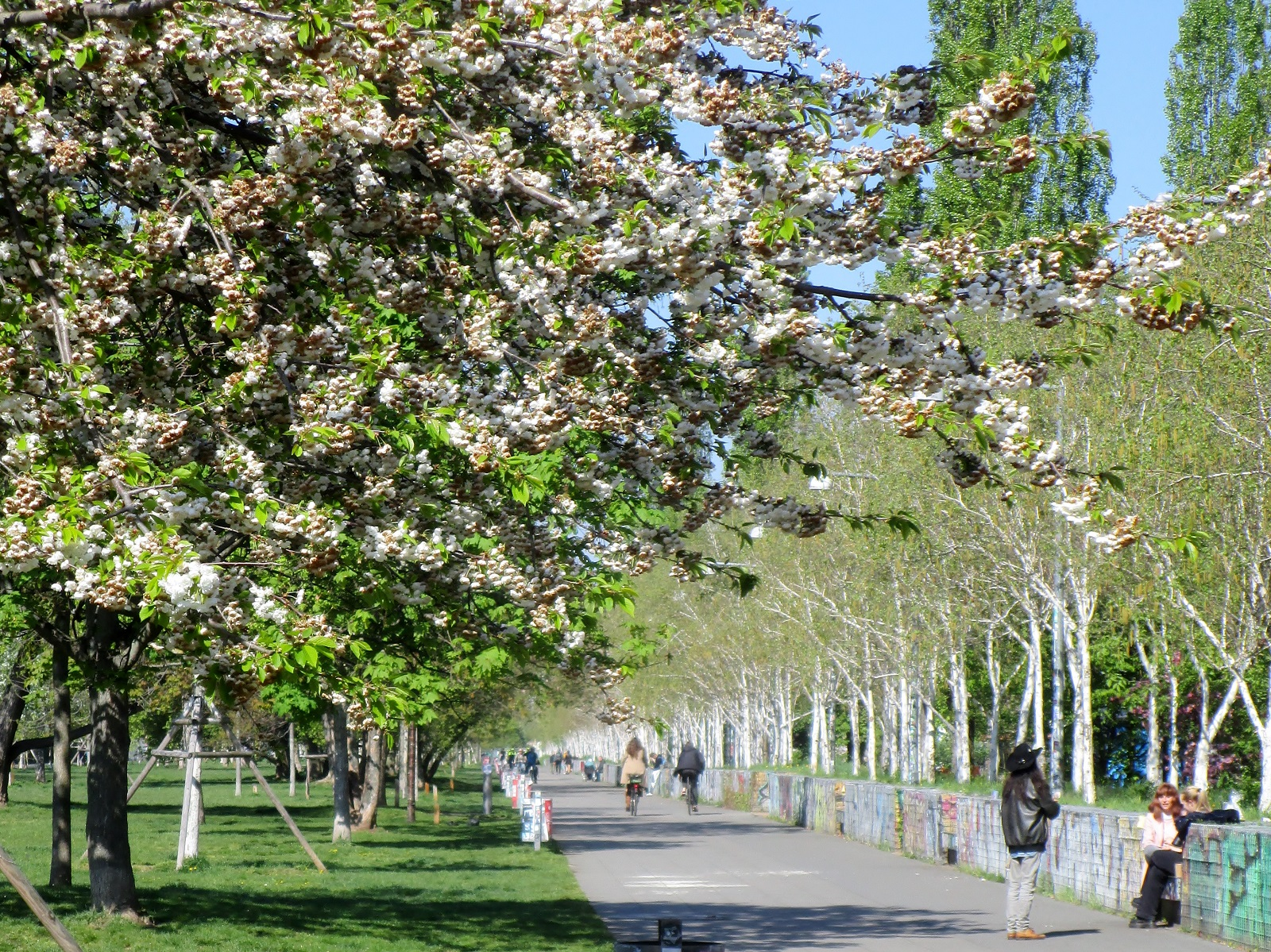
- Main promenade of Lene Voigt Park (2025)
- Interactive map of Lene Voigt Park
- Location: Leipzig, Germany
- Coordinates: 51°20′3.6″N 12°23′55.6″E
- Area: 8.65 hectares (21.4 acres)
- Created: 2004
- Operator: Municipality

The Lene Voigt Park is a park in the locality of Reudnitz in the district south-east of Leipzig, Germany. It was opened in 2004 and named on 13 July 2005 after the Upper Saxon German dialect poet Lene Voigt (1891–1962), who lived in the adjacent Reichpietschstraße (then Nostitzstraße) from 1920 to 1925.

== Description ==
The 800 metres (2,600 ft) long and 80 metres (260 ft) to 130 metres (430 ft) wide park takes its shape from the site of the former train station Leipzig Eilenburger Bahnhof, on which it lies. It is in the form of an elongated rectangle oriented west–east. On three sides, the park is bordered by streets at the same level, whereas the street Riebeckstrasse is higher on the east side. It crosses the former railway line on a bridge, along which the park's main path, also called the main promenade, continues eastwards as a rail trail out of the park.

The 5 metres (16 ft) wide main promenade runs straight and opens up the park along its entire length. On its north side, the main promenade is lined with birch trees and a wall made of wire gabions, into which seating is embedded. On the south side of the main promenade there is a wide strip of lawn with trees, which is open to public use. To the south of this, the park is closed off by a ribbon-like structure in which squares planted with robinia trees, hedge cabinets and a variety of sports and games facilities alternate, such as table tennis tables, playing fields as well as opportunities for boules, inline skating, climbing and much more. Some rotating weathering steel elements are striking.

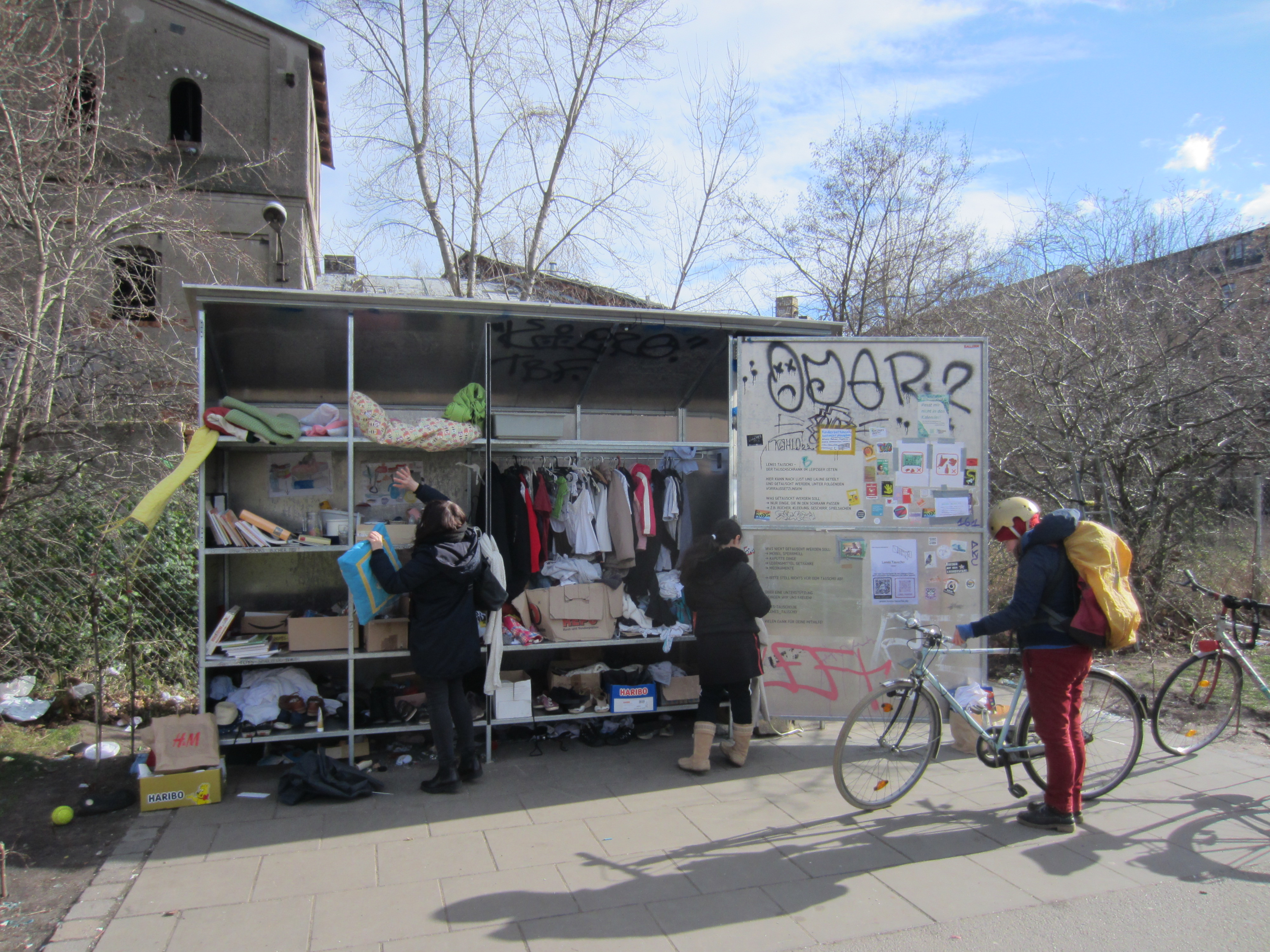
"Lenes Tauscho" - Exchange cabinet at the eastern end of the Lene Voigt Park

Since 2021, the exchange cabinet "Lenes Tauscho" has been located at the eastern end of the park. It fell victim to vandalism in 2023 but was subsequently rebuilt.

== Side effects of high usage pressure ==
In response to an inquiry in 2024, the city acknowledged the negative side effects of the high usage pressure to which the park is exposed, particularly from spring to autumn. These side effects included wear and tear on the lawn, pollution, and noise. As a countermeasure, publicly accessible sanitary facilities (urine-diverting dry toilets) for free were installed in December 2023, which had already been used 15,000 times in just a few months.

== Award ==
The Lene Voigt Park was awarded the European Prize for Urban Public Space in 2002. This was intended to particularly recognize the public participation in the planning process.

== Drinking fountain ==
Since September 2020, a drinking fountain is in operation from spring to autumn on the north side of Reichpietschstrasse.
