= Saxon Psychiatric Museum =

Museum in Leipzig, Germany

- Established: 2000
- Location: Leipzig, Germany
- Coordinates: 51°20′11.7″N 12°21′18.6″E
- Type: Psychiatric museum
- Public transit access: Tram stop Marschnerstraße
- Website: Sächsisches Psychiatriemuseum (only in German)

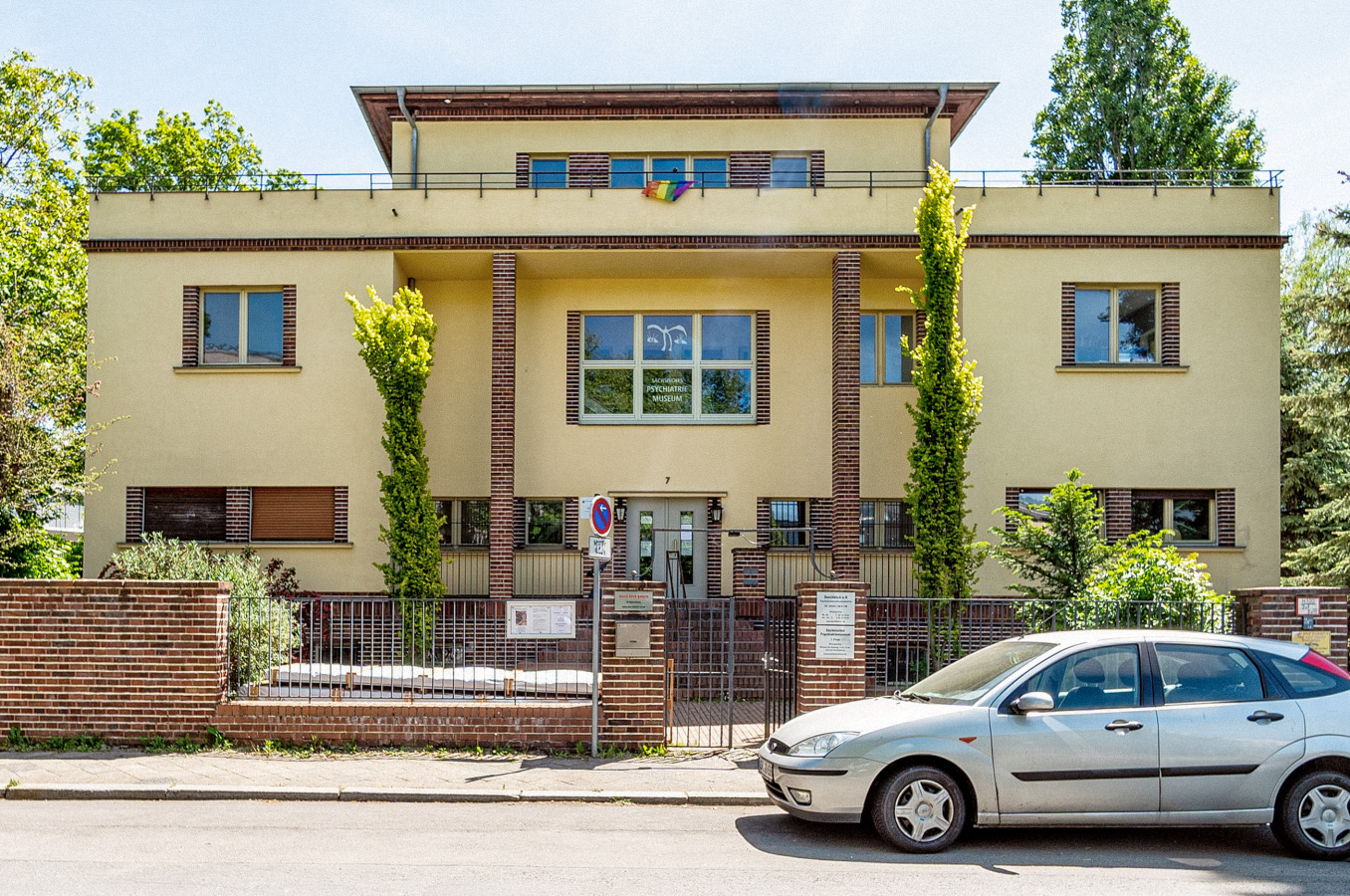
Villa Benkard (seat of the museum)

The Saxon Psychiatric Museum (Sächsisches Psychiatriemuseum) is a small museum in Leipzig and deals with the history of lunatic asylums and psychiatry. It is organized by the Durchblick association, an initiative for people affected by psychiatry in Leipzig. It was founded in 2000. The special exhibitions deal with individual fates, careers and institutions:

- the life stories of the court president Daniel Paul Schreber (1842–1911) and the Saxon dialect poet Lene Voigt (1891–1962)
- the biographies and therapeutic concepts of doctors and psychiatrists such as Christian August Fürchtegott Hayner (1775–1837) and Hermann Paul Nitsche (1876–1948)
- the development of psychiatric institutions in Saxony in the Middle Ages (Hospital St. Georg) up to the sanatorium and nursing homes (Sonnenstein Castle, Thonberg private institution, Dösen sanatorium).

== Literature ==
Hubert Kolling. Review from 21 May 2014 in German language to: Thomas R. Müller: Wahn und Sinn. Patienten, Ärzte, Personal und Institutionen der Psychiatrie in Sachsen vom Mittelalter bis zum Ende des 20. Jahrhunderts. Katalog zur Dauerausstellung des Sächsischen Psychiatriemuseums. (Delusion and sense. Patients, doctors, staff and institutions of psychiatry in Saxony from the Middle Ages to the end of the 20th century. Catalog for the permanent exhibition of the Saxon Psychiatric Museum), Mabuse-Verlag GmbH (Frankfurt am Main) 2014. 2nd, corr. and supplemented edition. ISBN 978-3-86321-146-2. Saxon Psychiatry Museum Leipzig of the people's affected by psychiatry association Durchblick eV In: socialnet reviews, ISSN 2190-9245, Link to the review, date of access 14 May 2023.
