= Leipzig Eilenburger Bahnhof =

Railway station in Leipzig, Germany

Coordinates: 51.3343°N 12.4002°E

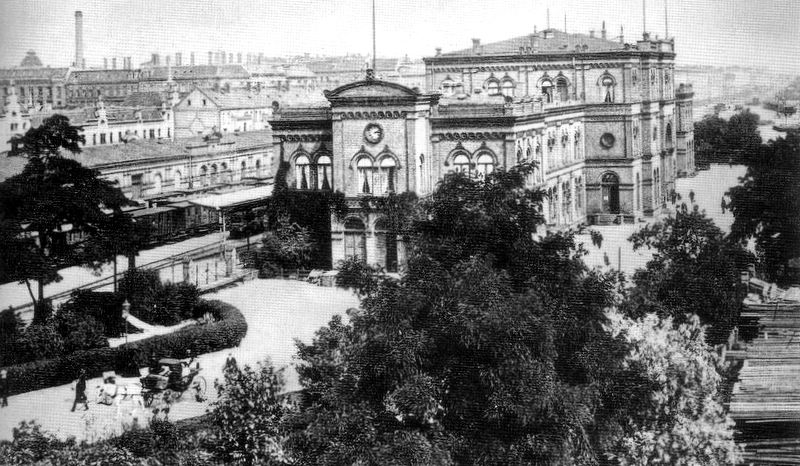
- Leipzig Eilenburger Bahnhof (1905)

General information
- Location: German Empire
- Line: Leipzig–Eilenburg railway

Construction
- Architect: Richard Steche

History
- Opened: 1 November 1874
- Closed: 2 November 1942
Location

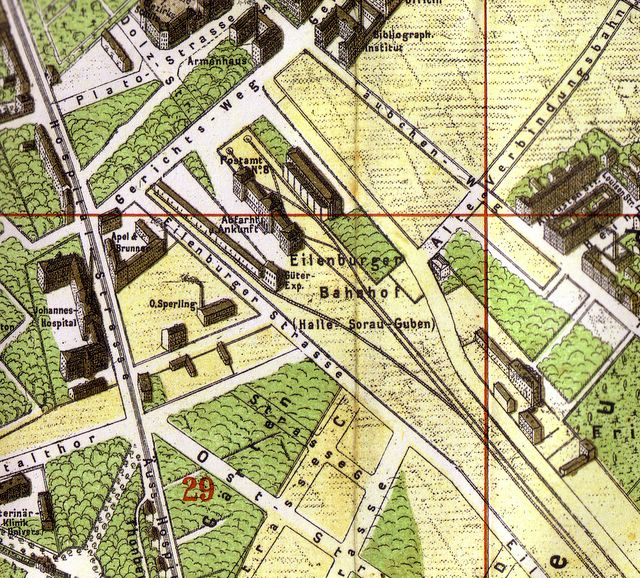
Leipzig Eilenburger Bahnhof on a map from 1884

Leipzig Eilenburger Bahnhof was a railway station in Leipzig that served as a passenger station on the Leipzig–Eilenburg railway line from 1874 to 1942. A large part of the former railway site is now Lene Voigt Park.

== History ==
By the year Leipzig Eilenburger Bahnhof opened, 1874, Leipzig, with its five stations at that time, had become one of the most important railway hubs in the German Empire. To improve its economic efficiency, the Halle-Sorau-Guben Railway Company decided in 1872 to connect Leipzig to its railway network. After lengthy negotiations, the Saxon state government granted the necessary concession on 24 December 1872.

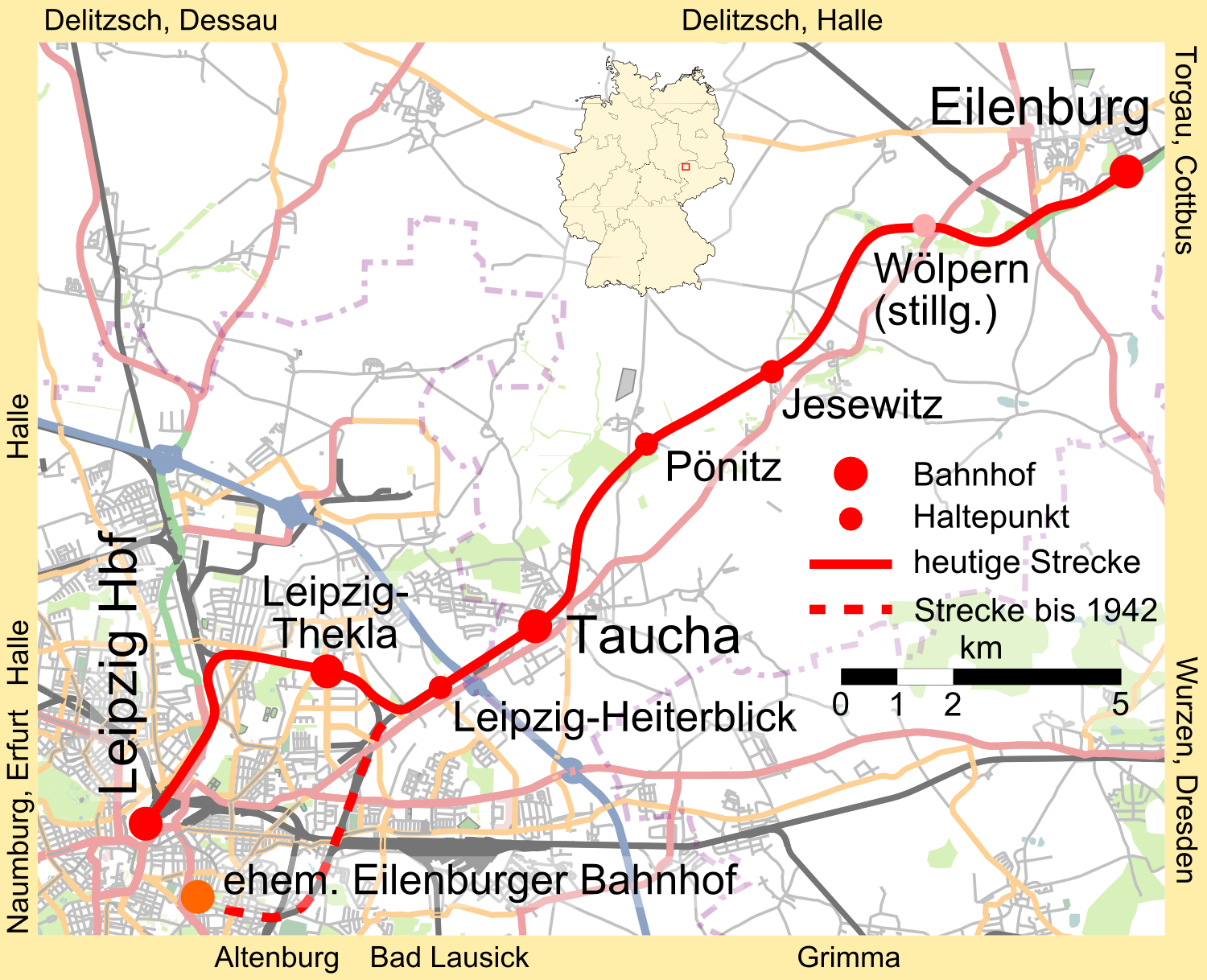
Leipzig–Eilenburg railway line with former route to Eilenburg station

Construction of the line to Taucha and on to Eilenburg then began without hesitation. The railway company acquired a site of approximately 10 ha (24.7 acres), which, compared to the other Leipzig stations, was located far outside the city center in the then-independent municipality of Reudnitz. The station area, approximately 900 m (2,953 ft) long and 150 m (492 ft) wide, was bordered by Eilenburger Strasse, Nostitzstrasse (now Reichpietschstrasse), Riebeckstrasse and Gerichtsweg. Rail service between Leipzig and Eilenburg began on 1 November 1874.

The two-story reception building of Leipzig Eilenburger Bahnhof was built between 1874 and 1876. Designed by Richard Steche, the two-story brick building was 115 m (377 ft) long and 18 m (59 ft) wide and housed several waiting and dining rooms. The total cost was 365,000 marks.

On 1 May 1915, the long-distance traffic that had previously been handled through Leipzig Eilenburger Bahnhof was integrated into the newly built Leipzig Central Station. From then on, Leipzig Eilenburger Bahnhof served only as a departure and arrival station for local trains to and from Eilenburg. Its primary function, however, was freight and express freight handling, as well as railway maintenance. The last passenger train left the station on 2 November 1942, for Taucha.

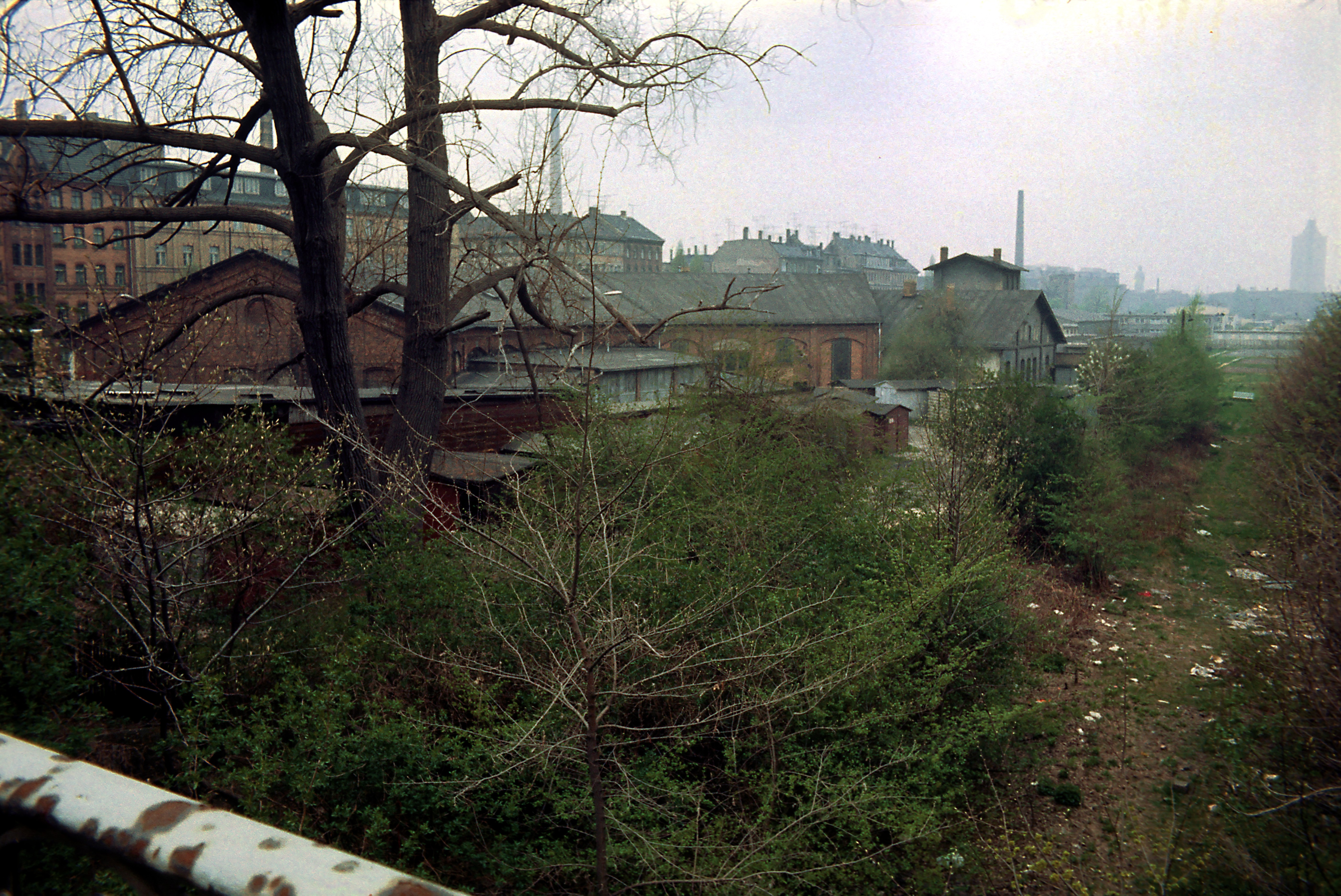
Leipzig Eilenburger Bahnhof from the Riebeckstrasse bridge, on the left the roundhouse, in 1983

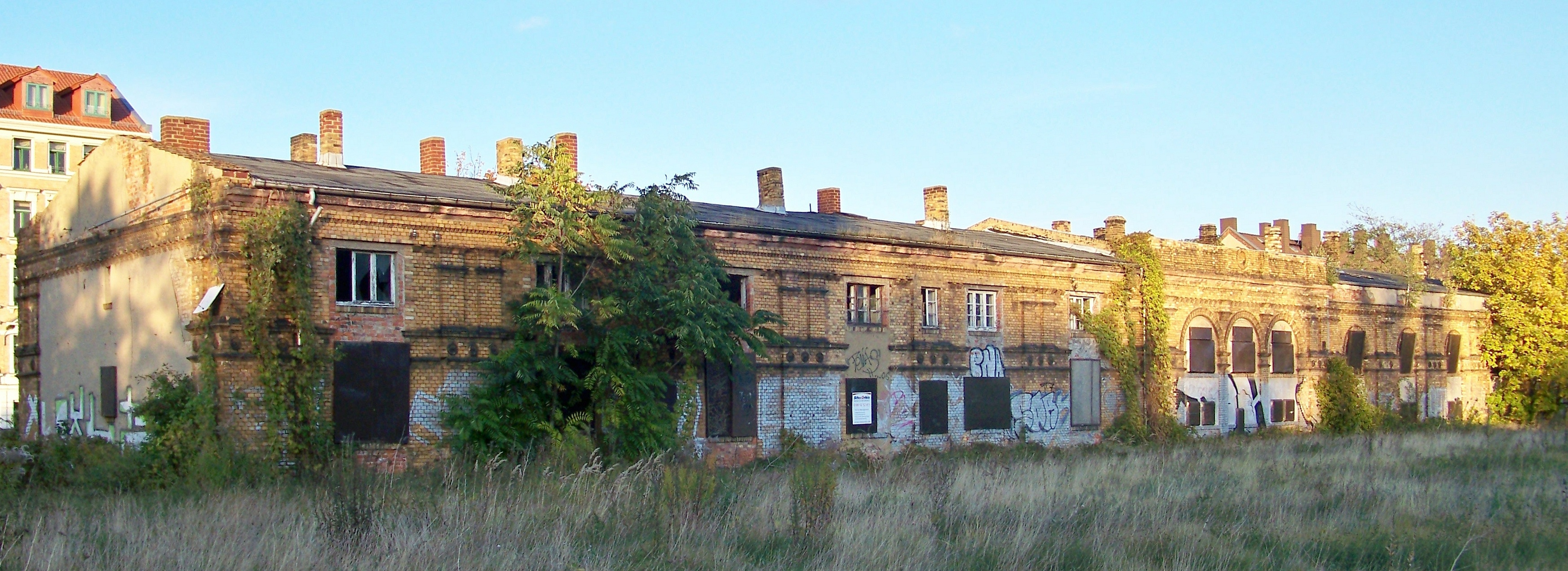
The former freight terminal building in October 2009

In the following years the station area was partially destroyed and the entrance building completely destroyed by the bombing of Leipzig in World War II. For this reason the facility could only be used for freight handling after 1945. From the 1960s onwards the buildings were gradually demolished. Until around 1973 transfer trains with up to 20 wagons per train were carried out to Eilenburg station. Until its closure there was a loading ramp for Culemeyer trailers to supply the surrounding industries. The site was also used as a siding for the construction trains of the Deutsche Reichsbahn and as a storage area for the bridge maintenance department in Halle. The last company connected to the former main line until 1994 was the Buchbindereimaschinenwerke Leipzig (Bookbinding machines works Leipzig) in the Leipzig locality of Anger-Crottendorf. Shortly after the turn of the millennium the last tracks, the switches at the Anger junction and the bridge superstructures over the Zweinaundorfer Strasse were removed.

In January 1997, Leipzig City Council decided to transform the site into a park. Subsequently, a district park was created, later named after Lene Voigt. Footpaths and cycle paths, as well as sports fields and playgrounds, were built. In 2002, Leipzig received the European Prize for Urban Public Space for the Reudnitz district park.

== Future ==
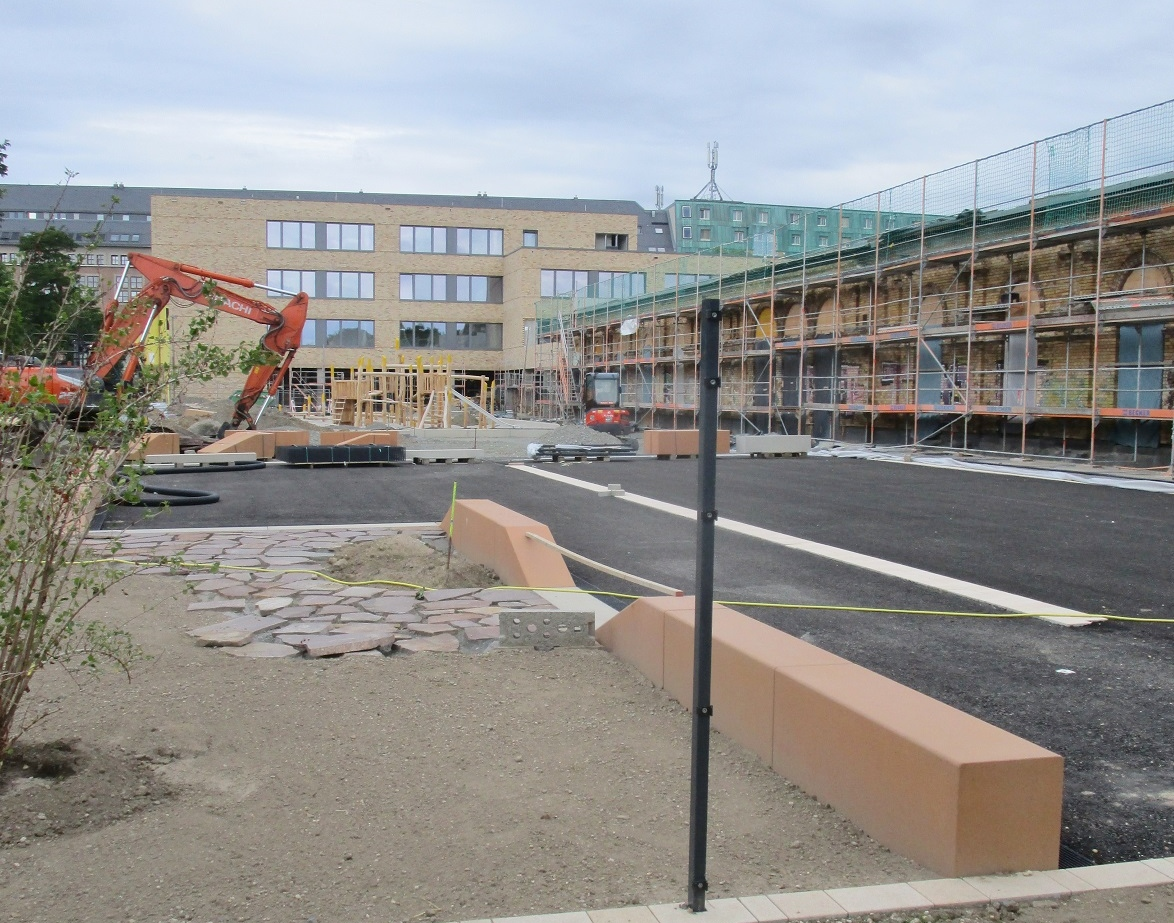
School under construction, on the right the listed building of the former freight terminal will be incorporated (2025)

A five-stream primary school is being built at Gerichtsweg/Reichpietschstrasse. It will be constructed on the previously closed-off site at the corner of Gerichtsweg and Reichpietschstrasse, where the yellow brick buildings of the former Leipzig Eilenburger Bahnhof are located. The listed buildings will be incorporated into the new development. The construction site has been prepared since the end of 2022, and construction work began in summer 2023.

== Bibliography ==
- Sturm, Wolfram (2003). Eisenbahnzentrum Leipzig. Geschichte von den Anfängen bis zur Gegenwart [Leipzig Railway Hub. History from the Beginnings to the Present.] (in German). Leipzig: Pro Leipzig. pp. 26–27. ISBN 3-9807201-9-5.
