= Eilenburg station =

Railway station in Eilenburg, Germany

Eilenburg
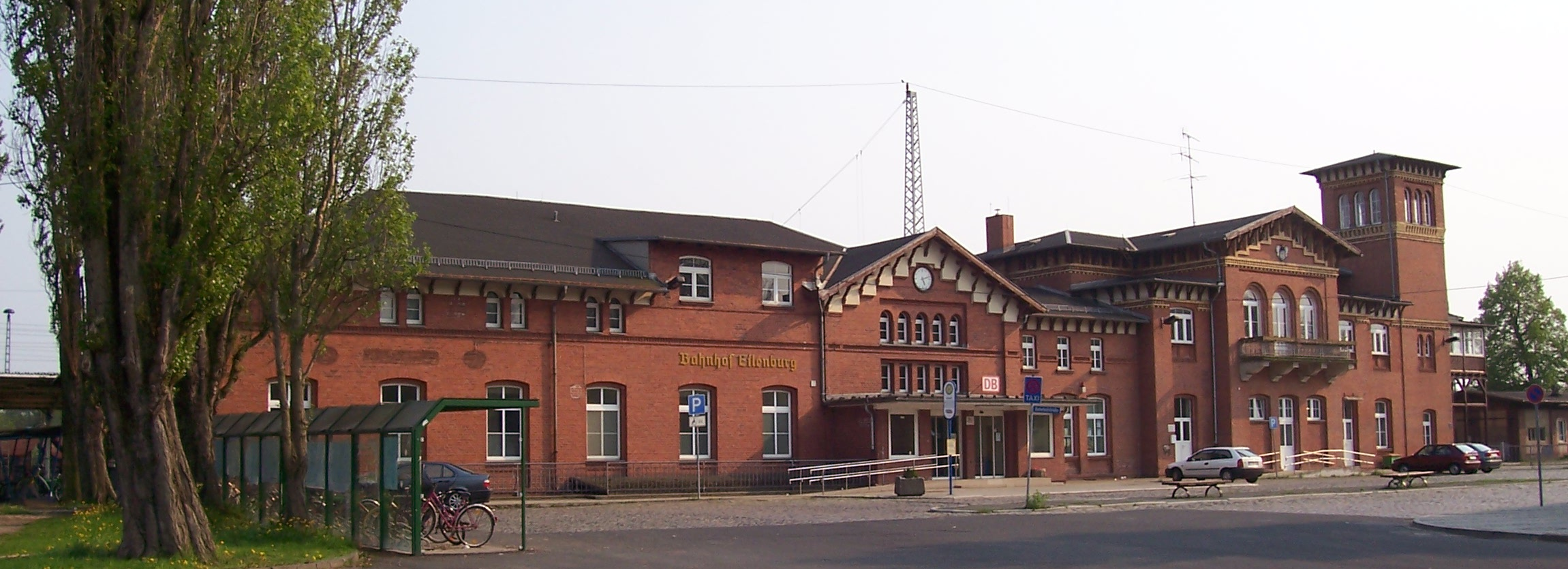
- Station building seen from the bus station

General information
- Location: Bahnhofstr. 21, Eilenburg, Saxony; Germany
- Coordinates: 51°27′06″N 12°38′12″E
- Lines: Leipzig Hbf–Eilenburg (km 23.7); Halle (Saale) Hbf–Guben (km 49.3); Pretzsch–Eilenburg (km 38.5); Wurzen–Eilenburg (km 24.0)
- Platforms: 4

Construction
- Accessible: No
- Architectural style: Historicism

Other information
- Station code: 1512
- DS100 code: LEG
- IBNR: 8010095
- Category: 4
- Fare zone: MDV: 167
- Website: www.bahnhof.de

History
- Opened: 1871

Passengers
- 1340

Services
| Preceding station | DB Regio Nordost | Following station |
|---|---|---|
| Taucha (Leipzig) towards Leipzig Hbf | RE 10 | Eilenburg Ost towards Frankfurt (Oder) |
| Taucha (Leipzig) towards Leipzig Hbf | RE 11 | Eilenburg Ost towards Hoyerswerda |
| Preceding station | Mitteldeutschland S-Bahn | Following station |
| Jesewitz towards Markkleeberg-Gaschwitz | S 4 | Eilenburg Ost towards Falkenberg (Elster) |
| Kämmereiforst towards Halle (Saale) Hbf | S 9 | Terminus |
Location
- Location within Saxony

Eilenburg station is one of two railway stations in the district town of Eilenburg in the German state of Saxony. It is classified by Deutsche Bahn as a category 4 station. The station is located on the southeastern edge of the town.

The station was opened in 1871 and gained importance over time in passenger and freight transport. Many workplaces were associated with it. Today, regional trains run to Leipzig, Halle (Saale), Hoyerswerda and Cottbus. Since the commissioning of the Leipzig City Tunnel, trains of the Mitteldeutschland S-Bahn stop in Eilenburg.

== History ==
The town of Eilenburg was in an area that was peripheral to Prussia, having been ceded to it by the Kingdom of Saxony at the Congress of Vienna. It was not until 1868, when there was already a dense railway network that the Halle-Sorau-Guben Railway Company (German: Halle-Sorau-Gubener Eisenbahn-Gesellschaft) was granted a concession and permit for the construction of a railway to it. The station building was built in 1871, which included service areas, ticket counters, baggage handling, housing for employees and four waiting rooms. The line from Falkenberg (Elster) via Eilenburg to Halle (Saale) was opened a year later, in April 1872. The branch to the Saxon university and trade fair city of Leipzig was opened in November 1874. The end of the line in Leipzig was at the Leipzig Eilenburger Bahnhof (the Eilenburg line station), which it had built as a terminus. The Eilenburg–Lutherstadt-Wittenberg line opened on 20 February 1895. About 1914, the idea had also developed of building a line from Eilenburg to Bitterfeld with its emerging industrial areas. Because of the outbreak of the First World War, this project did not, however, go beyond the planning phase.

The last section of the Eilenburg–Wurzen railway was opened in 1927. Its construction was also almost abandoned due to the First World War.

The station was a major employer from its opening. In 1910, there were a total of 233 employees and in 1933 this had risen to 570. These were distributed as follows: railway workers (250), rail workshop (40), rollingstock maintenance (6), carriage cleaning (4), track maintenance (Bahnmeisterei) together with signal maintenance and artisans (220) and freight and baggage handling and ticketing (50). The station was a powerful force for the economic development of the whole town.

On 29 March 1945, the most serious accident happened in the history of the station. On that day at about 12:45 a freight train loaded with Nebelwerfer mortar projectiles caught fire, as the wood wool that was used to complete the charge had ignited. To minimize the damage from an explosion, the affected wagon was detached and pushed out from the station to the west towards Wedelwitz. At about 13:00 clock, there was an explosion and the shock wave was felt throughout the while town. 40 people were killed when it detonated and the fire-fighting operation is said to have lasted until the following morning.

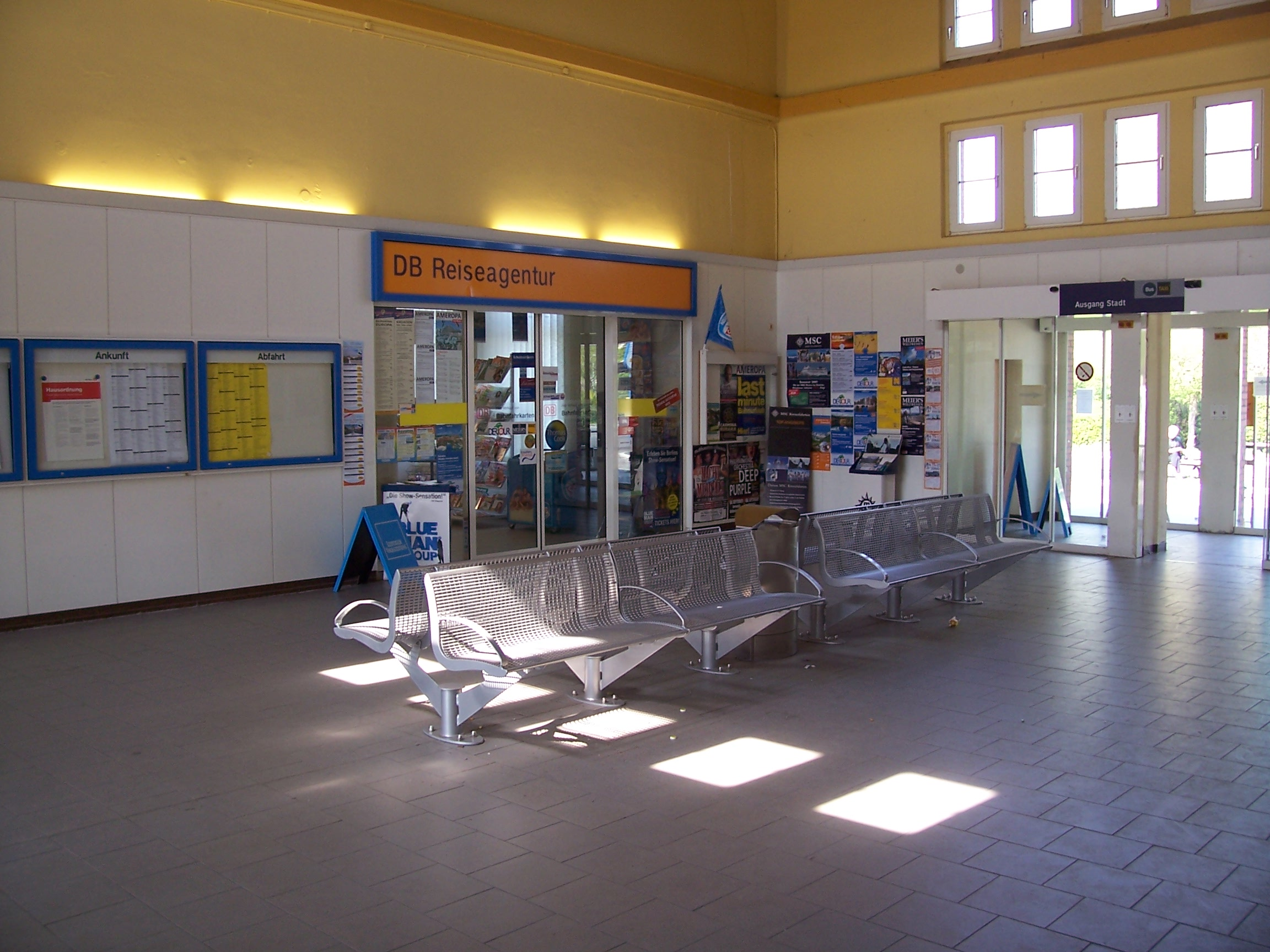
The waiting hall was closed in 2011. With the addition of the S-Bahn service in December 2013, a transport centre ('S-Punkt') has opened in the east wing of the entrance building.

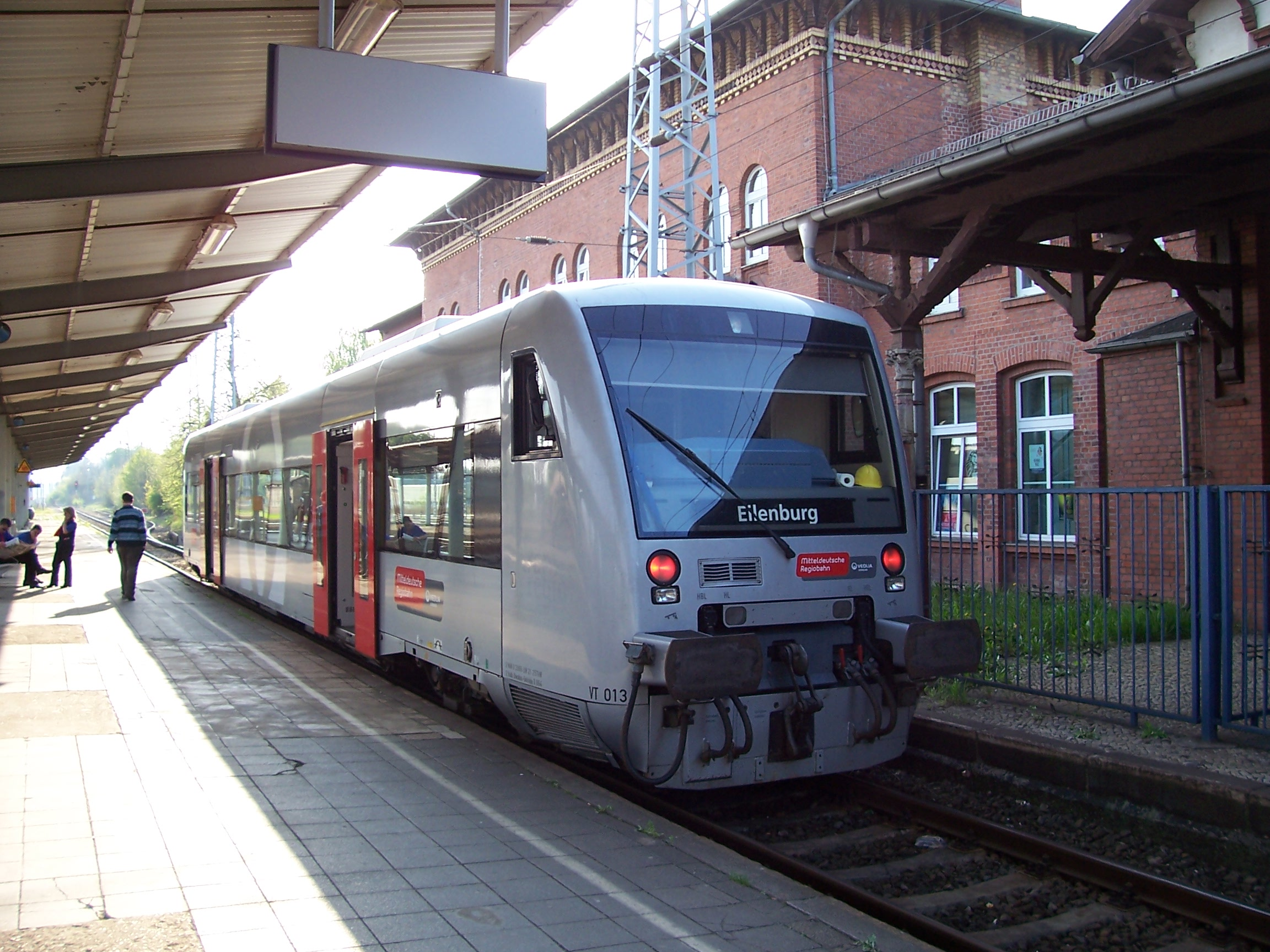
A Mitteldeutsche Regiobahn EMU on platform 1

Eilenburg station was in the territory of the Reichsbahndirektion (railway division) of Halle (Saale), which was dissolved in 1994. In the 1980s, the freight depot had reached its capacity. Approximately 1,000 cars were loaded each month and twice as many were unloaded. 30 freight trains daily were formed or broken up. In passenger services, express trains (Durchgangszug) running on the Kraków–Erfurt, Frankfurt (Oder)–Mönchengladbach and Cottbus–Eisenach routes and semi-fast trains on the Cottbus–Leipzig route stopped in Eilenburg. In 1995, an InterRegio service running from Lübeck via Schwerin, Magdeburg and Leipzig to Cottbus replaced the express trains. The long-distance service had been abandoned by 2000 and replaced by two Regional-Express services.

Passenger services were abandoned from Eilenburg to Wurzen in 1978. 20 years later, the state of Saxony ended scheduled passenger traffic on the route to Wittenberg between Eilenburg station and Bad Düben.

The external appearance of Eilenburg station was improved by the Zweckverband für den Nahverkehrsraum Leipzig (the Leipzig local transport authority) and DB Station&Service in 2010 in preparation for the 1050 anniversary of the town. Vandalism to the station building was removed and platform 1 was rebuilt at a cost of about €200,000. In the western area of the station, catenary, rail tracks and signals have been under reconstruction since June 2011; this will create better conditions for freight train formation and allow for a faster entrance into the station from Leipzig and Halle. The cost will be around €7 million.

== Description ==
=== Passenger station ===
The infrastructure of the passenger station includes the red brick entrance building, which has a tower on its west side. It was built in the 1870s and was extensively renovated in the 1990s. It is now heritage-listed. The Deutsche Bahn-owned restaurants closed a short time after the renovation. Two small retail spaces have also been untenanted recently. The remaining DB travel agency, which included a newsagency, was closed in late 2011. The waiting hall also remains closed. In May 2012, it was announced that the DB had sold the building to an Eilenburg telecommunications company. There are plans to upgrade the building by the autumn of 2012 as the company's headquarters. The tracks are located south of the entrance building and on the other side of them is federal highway 87. The station has two platforms with four edges for transport services: the platform 1 has a length of 470 metres and platform 2 is 325 metres long and is reached by a pedestrian underpass. Both have a platform height of 38 centimetres. On platform 2, there are still a waiting room and the office of the platform supervisor, both of which are now unused. The main platform, as well as a 150-metre-long outside platform, which connects to platform 2 are no longer used for the embarkation and disembarkation of passengers. The station building is accessible by the disabled, but the platforms can only be reached by stairs.

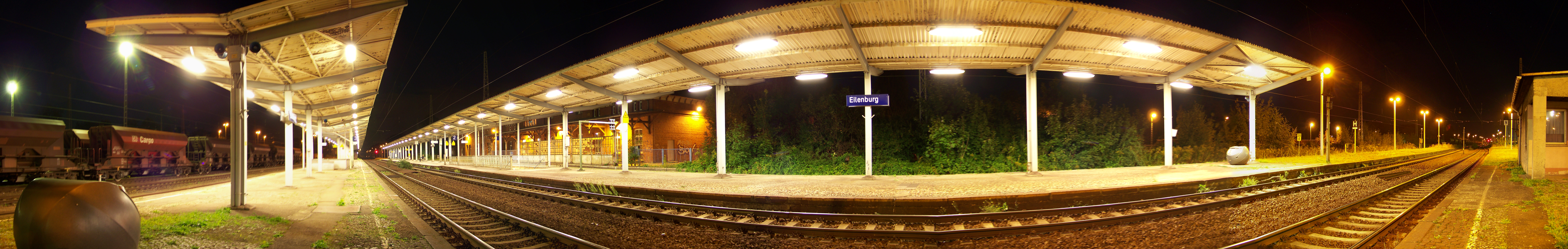
The equipment of the passenger station at night. On the extreme right is the building of the former platform supervisor (Aufsicht P).

=== Freight yard ===
In Eilenburg, close to the south end of the passenger station, there are about ten tracks of a freight yard with a hump. There are also sidings for the use of freight cars and locomotives to the east of the entrance building and the Railion social facility. In this area on track 39, there is still a power supply point and there was formerly a loading dock. Today there is a loading road next to track 34. In addition to the dispatcher signalbox (coded Ew) there is an office of DB Netz. The supervisor of the freight yard is no longer available. A Voith Gravita diesel locomotive (class DB-261) series is used for marshalling. Previously, this task required one to two diesel locomotives of class V 90. A class 232 locomotive is used to haul the connecting freight trains.

=== Locomotive depot ===
A locomotive depot (Bahnbetriebswerk) was established in Eilenburg in 1926. It oversaw the locomotive depots in Torgau and Schildau and, after 1964, also the locomotive depots in Wurzen. It operated 16 to 18 locomotives of classes 38, 52.80, 55.72 and 94 for operations in Eilenburg. There were also six to eight locomotives in Torgau, two in Schildau and three in Wurzen.

The Eilenburg depot, including its three branches, employed a total of about 350 people in management, locomotive despatch, locomotive maintenance, maintenance of technical systems and stationary personnel. The engine crew alone had 90 employees. Marshalling operations included, among other things, the operation of the sidings at Eilenburg Ost station, the Eilenburg chemical plant (Eilenburger Chemiewerk) and the Dermatoid works. The depot included a roundhouse with 12 tracks, of which four were part of the workshop.

In the mid-1960s, the first diesel locomotives of DR classes V 100 and V 60 were put into service. Shortly afterwards, these were followed by three locomotives of DR class V 200. These gradually took over from the steam locomotives. After the electrification of the Halle (Saale)–Eilenburg line in the late 1980s, electric locomotives of classes 211, 242, 243 and 250 were also put into service.

The Eilenburg depot lost its status as an independent agency in 1969. In 1995, the turntable and the slag conveyor were demolished and the two water towers were closed. The social area and the changing rooms were still in use until 1999.

== Transport services ==
=== History ===
From the opening of the station until at least the end of the Second World War, it handled through traffic from Halle to Cottbus, unlike today. To get to Leipzig, it was necessary to change in Eilenburg. This was because Eilenburg and Halle were in Prussia, while Leipzig was in Saxony. In 1944, an express train (Durchgangszug) and a semi-fast train (Eilzug) ran from Halle to Cottbus each day as well as an express train from Leipzig to Cottbus. In addition, five passenger trains ran from Halle to Falkenberg (Elster), some continuing to Cottbus. In addition, seven passenger trains ran from Leipzig to Eilenburg each day. There were four daily services to Lutherstadt Wittenberg and three from Wittenberg each day.

During the existence of East Germany, there were many commuter trains in the morning and in the afternoon. In 1970, through trains mainly ran from Leipzig to Cottbus, so that now travellers to and from Halle had to be change in Eilenburg. Three express and three semi-fast trains ran each day in each direction between Leipzig and Cottbus, which invariably stopped in Eilenburg. Then there were thirteen passenger services to and from Leipzig or over part of the line through Taucha (b Leipzig). On the Halle–Eilenburg line, there were, apart from a pair of express trains each day, only regional services. So there were thirteen passenger trains in each direction. There were seven continuous connections between Eilenburg and Wittenberg in each direction in 1970. On the Eilenburg–Wurzen branch line, on which passenger services ended in 1978, there were four pairs of trains a day in 1970.

=== Passenger services ===
There have been no long-distance services on the lines connecting to Eilenburg since 2000. Eilenburg station, listed in sections 209.43, 218.1, 501.4 and 501.9 of the timetable, is served by the following regional transport services operated by DB Regio:

| Line | Route | Interval | Operator |
|---|---|---|---|
| RE 10 | Leipzig – Eilenburg – Torgau – Falkenberg (Elster) – Doberlug-Kirchhain – Calau – Cottbus | 120 | DB Regio Nordost |
| RE 11 | Leipzig – Eilenburg – Torgau – Falkenberg (Elster) – Elsterwerda-Biehla – Ruhland – Hoyerswerda | 120 | DB Regio Nordost |
| S 4 | Markkleeberg-Gaschwitz – Leipzig Hbf (low) – Eilenburg – Torgau – Falkenberg (Elster) | 30 | DB Regio Südost |
| S 9 | Eilenburg – Delitzsch – Halle | 60 (Mon–Fri); 120 (Sat–Sun) | DB Regio Südost |

The Regional-Express services operate daily at 120-minute intervals. With the addition of a service of the Mitteldeutschland S-Bahn, services on the Eilenburg–Falkenberg (Elster) section run every 60 minutes. From 5:00 (Saturdays from 7:00, Sundays from 9:00) to 21.30, the S-Bahn service to Leipzig runs every 30 minutes.

The new S9 line of the Mitteldeutschland S-Bahn was introduced at the timetable change in December 2017. It replaced the previous regional railway services between Eilenburg and Halle.

=== Regional bus services ===
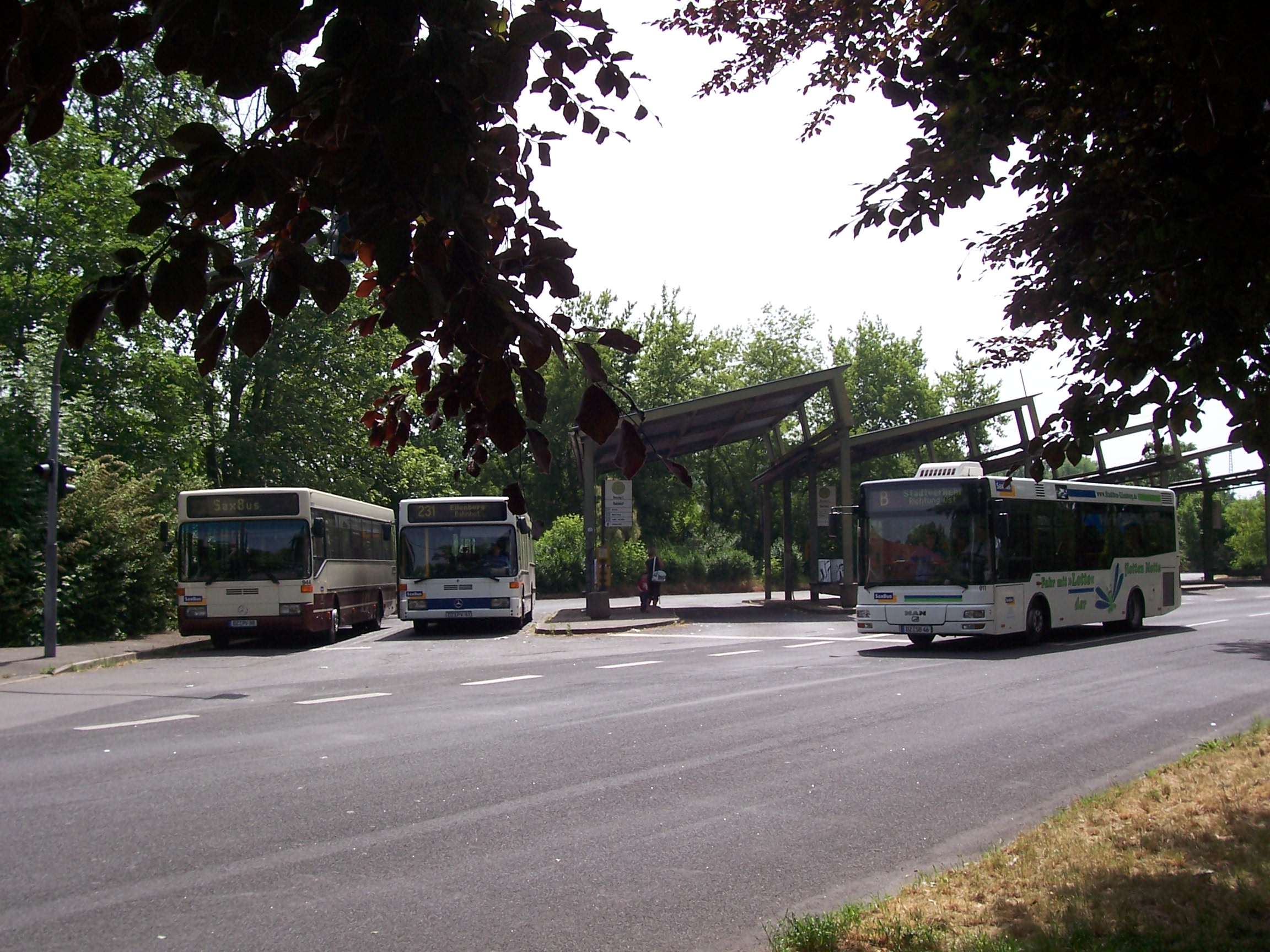
Bus platforms at the station

Eilenburg station is on the southern edge of the town and is connected to the centre by Bahnhofstraße (“station street”). The station is an interchange between the local rail services and urban and regional bus services operated by SaxBus and other companies. The main transfer point of Eilenburger Busverkehr (Eilenburg bus transport) with five bus platforms is at the station. 15 regional bus lines operate from here, some hourly hourly. In addition, the Bahnhof bus station is the meeting point of the two city bus services running every half-hour to Eilenburg-Ost and Eilenburg-Berg. For easy interchange between the two lines, another bus platform was created in front of the station building. As a station mainly used by commuters, 50 car and 80 bike parking spaces have been unstalled at Eilenburg station. There is also a taxi rank In front of the station building.
