= Leipzig–Eilenburg railway =

German railway line

Leipzig Hbf–Eilenburg railway
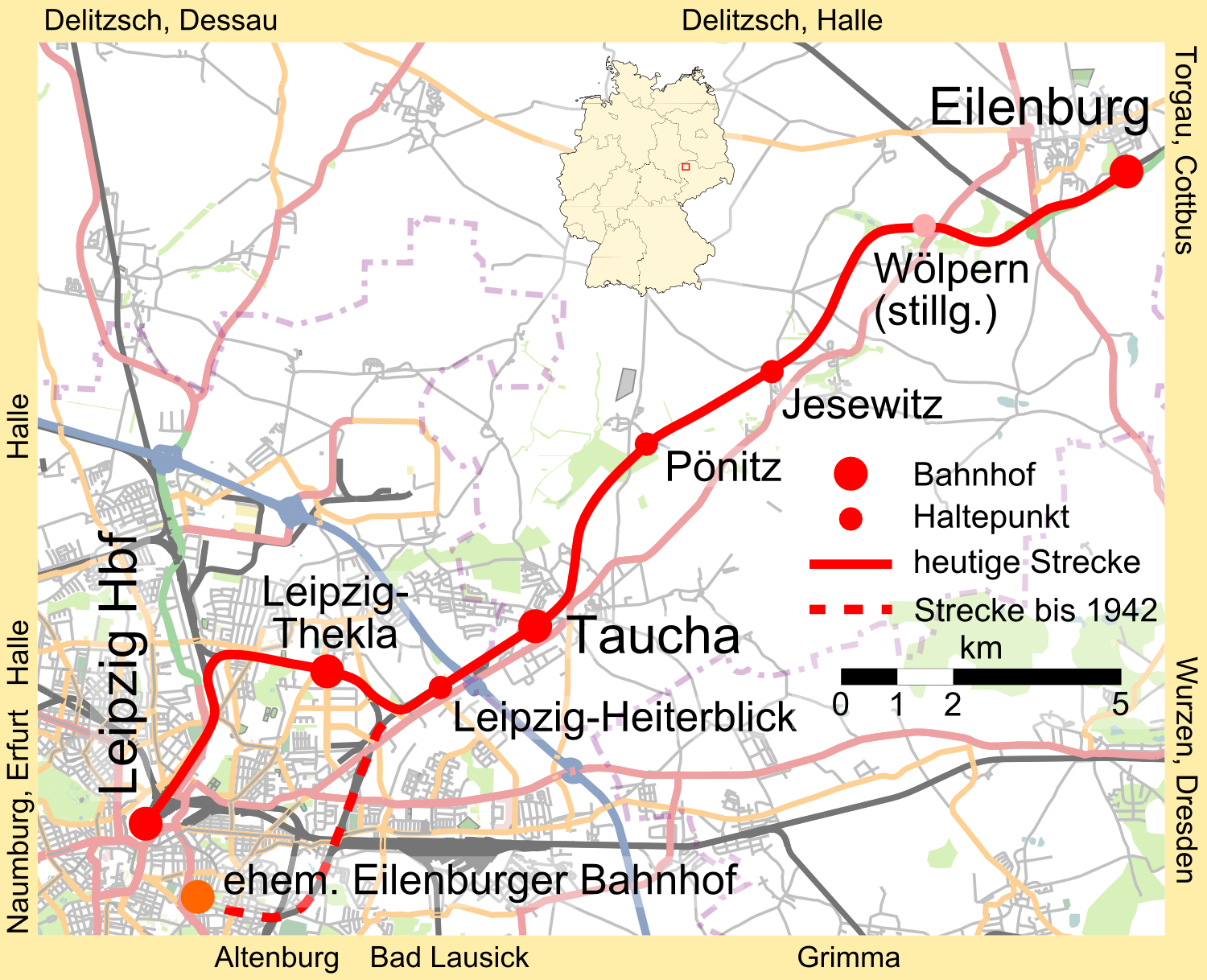

Overview
- Line number: 6360
- Locale: Saxony, Germany

Service
- Route number: 215, 228

Technical
- Line length: 24.66 km (15.32 mi)
- Number of tracks: 2: Leipzig-Heiterblick–Eilenburg
- Track gauge: 1,435 mm (4 ft 8 1/2 in) standard gauge
- Minimum radius: 350 m (1,150 ft)
- Electrification: 15 kV/16.7 Hz AC catenary
- Operating speed: 120 km/h (74.6 mph) (maximum)
- Maximum incline: 1.1%

The Leipzig–Eilenburg railway is a two-track, electrified mainline railway in the German state of Saxony, originally built and operated by the Halle-Sorau-Guben Railway Company (German: Halle-Sorau-Gubener Eisenbahn-Gesellschaft) as the Eilenburg Railway (Eilenburger Eisenbahn). It runs from Leipzig to Eilenburg and is part of the long-distance connection from Leipzig to Cottbus.

== History ==
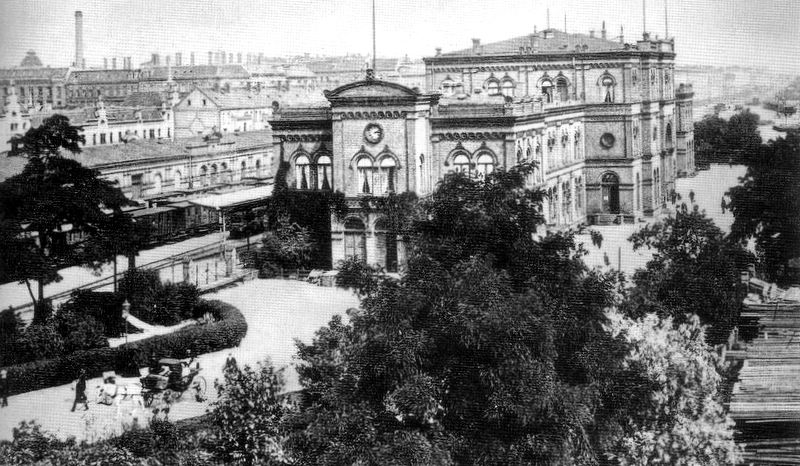
Leipzig Eilenburger Bahnhof (1905)

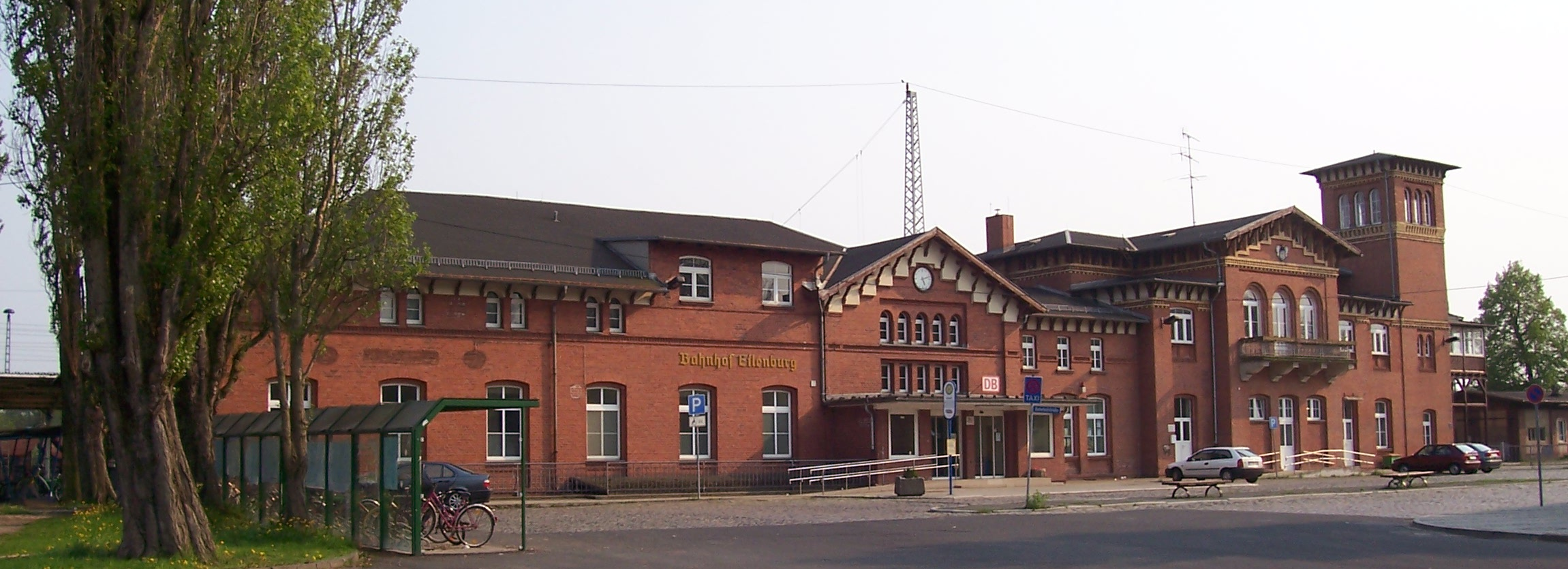
Eilenburg station (2008)

The line branches off in Eilenburg from the Halle–Cottbus railway, which was built in 1872. The line runs via Jesewitz and Taucha to Leipzig and is 23.6 km long. On 1 November 1874, the route was opened as a connection to the Leipzig–Dresden railway. In Leipzig, it terminated at the Eilenburger Bahnhof (Eilenburg station), which at that time was on the eastern outskirts of the city.

In 1884, the line, along with rest of the Hall-Sorau-Guben Railway, was nationalised and became part of the Prussian state railways and on 1 April 1920 it was absorbed into Deutsche Reichsbahn. Beginning in 1942, passenger services to Eilenburger Bahnhof were completely abandoned. All trains now operated to Leipzig Hauptbahnhof.

After the Second World War, the line's second track was dismantled. The second track has been restored on the line between Eilenburg and Jesewitz since 1977. The second track was restored between Heiterblick junction and Taucha (b Leipzig) a year later and the section between Taucha and Jesewitz was rebuilt with two tracks in 1980. Due to insufficient bridge clearances on the Leipzig Hbf–Heiterblick section, it is now operated as a single-track. The line was electrified in 1988.

== Operations ==
Currently the line in served by Regional-Express service RE 10 between Leipzig and Cottbus and the S-Bahn line S4 service of the Mitteldeutschland S-Bahn on the Geithain–Borna–Leipzig–Eilenburg–Torgau–Hoyerswerda route. Between Leipzig Hbf and Leipzig-Thekla, the S4 services operate daily at 30-minute intervals. The RE 10 services, which run every 120 minutes together with the S-Bahn services provide services to Eilenburg at 30-minute intervals each day. The RE 10 services are operated as coupled sets consisting of a four-part and a two-part Bombardier Talent 2 electric railcar. The S4 services are operated with four and three-part Talent 2 sets, both coupled and as single sets. The S4 services replaced the RE 11 and the Regionalbahn RB 115 services.
