= Elizabeth Compton Hegemann =

American photographer (1897–1962)

- Born: Elizabeth Compton; March 20, 1897; Indian Hill, Ohio
- Died: April 8, 1962 (aged 65)
- Other names: Elizabeth Compton Harrison, Elizabeth Compton Rorick
- Occupations: Photographer, store owner, author
- Spouse(s): Michael Harrison (1925–28); Harry Rorick (ca. 1929-1939); Anton Hegemann (ca. 1940-?)

Elizabeth Compton Hegemann (March 20, 1897 – April 8, 1962) was an early 20th-century American photographer, trader, and author best known for her photographs of Southwest Native American peoples taken during the 1920s and 1930s, especially the Navajo.

== Early life and education ==
Elizabeth Compton was born in 1897 in Indian Hill, Ohio, to William Clay Compton and Minnie Gove. She was educated at a college preparatory school in Cincinnati.

== Career ==
Hegemann's interest in Southwest Native Americans developed during her first marriage when she frequently visited Navajo and Hopi reservations within driving distance of the Grand Canyon, where her husband was stationed. She also apprenticed for a time at a local Indian arts and crafts shop. After her marriage broke up in the late 1920s, Hegemann moved to Tuba City on a Navajo Reservation in Coconino County, Arizona. With her second husband, she purchased the Shonto Trading Post, and beginning in the winter of 1929-30, they ran this business for a decade. During this period, she took many photographs of Native Americans, initially with a Kodak camera and later with a Graflex.

At some point before World War II, she sold the trading post to Harry and remarried; the 1940 census lists her as living in San Diego with her third husband, Anton Hegemann. She spent the remainder of her life in southern California and New Mexico as well as Arizona.

In 1963, Hegemann published Navaho Trading Days, a vivid account of her experiences at the Grand Canyon during the early days of its development as a tourist site, and on the reservation during her trading post days. Her text is accompanied by over 300 of her own documentary photographs of Native Americans (Navajo, Hopi, and Havasupai) and their villages, crafts, and ceremonies taken during the interwar years, along with photographs from the Grand Canyon. The book is recognized as an important source of information about life on the reservation during a transitional period.

== Personal life ==
Hegemann married three times, changing her last name each time. In 1925 she married Michael Harrison, who worked for the National Park Service; they separated three years later. In 1929, she married Harry Rorick; this marriage lasted around a decade. Her third husband was Anton Hegemann (b. ca. 1890).

== Death ==
Hegemann published an article on Navajo silver, in 1962. She died that same year.

== Legacy ==
Hegemann's photographs and negatives are held by the following institutions:

- A collection of her negatives and prints is held by the Museum of Northern Arizona.
- A collection of 800 prints is held by the Huntington Library in California.
- A collection of 35-mm copy negatives of prints used in Hegemann's book is held in the Smithsonian Institution's National Anthropological Archives.
- A few of Hegemann's photographs and a manuscript of her book are included in a collection of documents related to her first husband, the Michael and Margaret B. Harrison Western Research Center Collection at the University of California, Davis.
