= Dietfried Müller-Hegemann =

German physician (1910–1989)

Dietfried Müller-Hegemann (5 May 1910 – 28 July 1989) was a German physician specialising in Psychiatry, Psychotherapy, Psychoanalysis and Neurology. Despite having joined the Communist Party in 1930, he was able to pursue his medical studies and career after 1933, becoming a military "staff doctor" when war broke out in 1939. Between 1944 and 1948 he was held as a prisoner of war by the Soviets. After that he was able to resume his medical career in the Soviet occupation zone / German Democratic Republic, achieving eminence both as a senior hospital physician and as a professor with the teaching chair in Psychiatry and Neurology at the prestigious Karl Marx University, Leipzig (as it was known between 1953 and 1991) in Leipzig. Following a falling out with the authorities he relocated to the German Federal Republic (West Germany) in 1971, pursuing his clinical career in Essen, while in the short term retaining an academic strand to his work as a visiting professor at the University of Pennsylvania.

== Life and works ==
=== Provenance and early years ===
Dietfried Müller-Hegemann was born in Laibach (as Ljubljana was known until) 1918), a multi-ethnic provincial capital within the Austro-Hungarian empire, much of which at that time was newly rebuilt following a major earthquake. In 1917, following the death of his father, the rest of the family relocated to Dresden.

In 1927, Müller-Hegeman joined the Young Communists, remaining a member until 1933. In 1930 or 1931, he joined the Communist Party itself. It was also in 1930 that he became a medical student, studying between 1930 and 1935 at the Ludwig-Maximilians-Universität München, the University of Vienna, the University of Königsberg, and the Friedrich Wilhelm University of Berlin. By 1935, Germany had been transformed, over just two years, into a one-party dictatorship. Müller-Hegeman joined the government backed "Nationalsozialistischer Deutscher Studentenbund" (NSDStB / " National Socialist...Students' Union"): he was a member until 1939. The Communist Party had been banned in 1933 and the ban was enthusiastically enforced by the security services. Nevertheless, according to at least one source, at the start of 1933, Müller-Hegeman became the leader of an anti-government resistance group which was "active" within the NSDStB applying "Trojan Horse tactics". As with most "underground" anti-government activity during this period, ninety years later details remain sparse.

Between 1936 and 1943, Müller-Hegeman was enrolled as a "training candidate" ("Ausbildingskandidat") (Note: In the context of training for work as a psychologist, an "Ausbildingskandidat" was subjected to certain specified treatments him- (or, more exceptionally, her)self before being considered qualified to apply them to patients.) at the Berlin-based German Institute for Psychological Research and Psychotherapy, an institution with its main focus on Psychoanalysis, then under the direction of the controversial Harald Schultz-Hencke. His own activities at the institute centred around psychoanalytical psychotherapy for Schizophrenia patients. In 1937, he transferred to Berlin's Charité (university hospital), employed as an assistant physician in the hospital's psychiatric clinic. It was here, still in 1937, that he received his doctorate in medicine in return for a piece of work on "An unusual array of symptoms of a commotion psychosis". (Note: "Ungewöhnliches Symptombild einer Commotionspsychose")

=== War years ===
In 1939, Müller-Hegemann enlisted as a "staff doctor". Between 1940 and 1941 he was posted to what became the Eastern Front, serving as a "military doctor". He subsequently returned to Berlin where he worked in an army hospital. He had retained his connections to the German Institute for Psychological Research and Psychotherapy, where during 1944 he delivered a series of lectures on psychotherapy for Schizophrenia patients. It was also in 1944 that he submitted his habilitation dissertation which under normal circumstances would have resulted in the award of a habilitation degree. However, his work triggered a serious and protracted disagreement with the institute director Harald Schultz-Hencke, who himself published a scholarly paper on the same topic at the same time. It is not clear whether it was the disagreement with Schultz-Hencke or the subsequent incarceration of Müller-Hegemann which meant that he only received his habilitation in 1951.

It is also far from clear how Müller-Hegemann fell into Soviet captivity in 1944. He spent the period between 1944 and 1948 as a Soviet prisoner of war. His captors, if they did not know it already, quickly became aware of his political engagement before 1933 as a member of the Communist Party. According to information which he himself later provided to the university authorities at Leipzig University, while in captivity he became the leader of an "antifascist committee" among his fellow detainees. One source refers to his having "gone through political training during his exile in Soviet Russia".

=== Soviet occupation zone (1945-1949) ===
In April 1946 a contentious political merger took place in the part of Germany that had been administered, since May 1945, as the Soviet occupation zone. Those who pushed the merger through may have intended that it should subsequently extend across all four of the military occupation zones into which the western two thirds of Germany had been divided, but that never happened. The most immediate effect of the merger was that the Communist Party and the Social Democratic Party came together to form the Socialist Unity Party (Sozialistische Einheitspartei Deutschlands / SED). Following the "unification congress", thousands of Communist Party members (along with many Social Democrats) - primarily those who had ended up in the Soviet zone - hastened to sign their party membership across to the new party. Despite his being detained in the Soviet Union while all this was going on, Dietfried Müller-Hegemann was one of those who became a member of the SED during 1946. In what later became a country marked by an exceptionally politicised health system, Müller-Hegemann would be a conspicuously loyal party member for many of the next 25 years. It was only in 1948 that he was released by the Soviets, however, and was able to return to Berlin. Here he obtained official recognition as a Persecutee of the Nazi Régime ("Verfolgter des Naziregimes" / VdN), a badge of honour that would confer increasing kudos after the relaunch of the Soviet occupation zone in October 1949 as the Soviet sponsored German Democratic Republic ("East Germany").

=== German Democratic Republic (1949-1990) ===
Back in Berlin, Müller-Hegemann discovered that he was a Pavolovian physiologist, and in December 1950 he became senior doctor (head of department) at the Psychiatric Clinic in Leipzig. By this point he had already been co-opted as a member of the "National Pavlov Commission". The next year he finally received his habilitation degree from the Charité (university hospital). The dissertation still concerned psychotherapy for Schizophrenia patients. (Note: "Die Psychotherapie bei schizophrenen Prozessen, Erfahrungen und Probleme") It is not known whether the contents had been changed in response to the disagreements triggered when the work had been first submitted back in 1944. At Leipzig University, he was appointed to a position as Privatdozent at the university medical faculty, which he then held between 1951 and 1955 (when he received his professorship). Between 1951 and 1953 he held, in addition a post as chief doctor at the "Landesanstalt Leipzig/Dösen", as the "Park Clinic" was known at that time. It was here that in 1953 he established Leipzig's first Psychotherapy institution. Alongside his other appointments, between 1952 and 1957 he served as "kommissarischer Leiter" (head) of the Leipzig Psychiatric Clinic.

In 1954, Dietfried Müller-Hegemann was awarded the Patriotic Order of Merit in bronze. Some felt that the East German honours system became devalued by overuse, but Patriotic Orders of Merit were introduced only in 1954, so at this stage Müller-Hegemann's award was still a rare honour. In 1955 he was appointed to a professorship at Leipzig University with a teaching contract. In 1957, a professorial teaching chair in Psychiatry at the university medical faculty was added, together with directorship (headship) of the Leipzig Psychiatric Clinic. He retained the university posts and directorship until 1964.

It is apparent, at least for those making use of the access to records provided by the subsequent passing of half a century, that as early as 1960 Müller-Hegemann's high-flying medical-academic career at Leipzig was becoming less secure than professional comrades might have supposed. Security Service files that survive in the Stasi archives show that for several years there had been reports circulating within the agency that Müller-Hegemann might be regarded as "politically unreliable", a much used standard phrase in Stasi reports, and one open to a wide range of interpretations. It is not obvious whether these carefully filed reports were based on criticism passed on by professional rivals following disputes over Psychiatric theory and practice, or whether more politically influential sources were involved. It does appear that throughout the 1960s, within the Security Services, adverse reports of Müller-Hegemann's alleged "political unreliability" were not pursued with any great sense of urgency. Nevertheless, on 31 August 1964 Müller-Hegemann abruptly resigned from all his university and related posts "following an event with fatal consequences". It turns out that the ostensible trigger for Müller-Hegemann's sudden fall from favour was the deaths of two patients, respectively in 1960 and 1962. The deaths had been caused, it was alleged, by the administration of "obsolete psychotropic drugs" and application of Ivan Pavlov's (by this time officially discredited) views on hypnotherapy. Archival research subsequently undertaken indicates that the real problem was concerns on the part of certain elements lower down in the party hierarchy who felt that the Leipzig head of department was becoming "ideologically suspect". The Karl Marx University, Leipzig was a prestigious institution where the nation's elite students obtained their degrees. Security service officers and informers were particularly numerous and active in the region. He was cleared following an investigation by the state prosecutor, but his accusers had won their battle: there would be no return for Dietfried Müller-Hegemann to the stellar career he had been enjoying in Leipzig.

He surfaced the next year in Berlin, where between 1965 and 1971 he headed up the Wilhelm Griesinger Psychiatric Hospital ("Psychiatrische Fachkrankenhaus "Wilhelm Griesinger") in Berlin-Wuhlgarten, as medical director. One source describes the Griesinger as "East Berlin's largest psychiatric institution". In reality the new appointment nevertheless fell a long way short of rehabilitation, and Müller-Hegemann's criticism of the way government policy impacted people's psychological well-being was becoming ever less "coded", even if the full extent of his fall from grace only became apparent after his resignation. A special SED ideology conference was held in February 1971 at which the party ratcheted up its determination to bring East German psychiatric profession into line with the party's ideas (no doubt closely reflecting the ideas of the Soviet Communist Party) on Psychology. The reaction of East Germany's elite psychology establishment, whose presence at the conference had been mandated, fell short of uncritical endorsement. Three months later Müller-Hegemann was a delegate at a medical conference in Munich (in West Germany). He never returned to East Germany. In a letter dated 10 May 1971 and addressed to his former deputy at the Wilhelm Griesinger Psychiatric Hospital he wrote that he had decided to stay behind in the west only with a heavy heart. He explained that the authorities had blocked the publication of two books he had written in the last few years, and that his specialist research work had also been effectively blocked in other ways. The East German government reacted to the "defection" by revoking his official status as a VdN (victim of Nazi persecution).

=== Western man ===
For approximately a year during 1972/73 Müller-Hegemann was a visiting professor at the University of Pennsylvania in Philadelphia. Although well known to psychology professionals in East Germany and, to a lesser extent, in other German-speaking countries, there were good career-related reasons for raising his professional profile more widely. In 1973 Dietfried published a short book entitled "Die Berliner Mauerkrankheit. Zur Soziogenese psychischer Störungen" ("The Berlin Wall illness: societal origins of a psychic disorder") in which he put forward the thesis that a certain combination of psychological symptoms correlated with how close they lived to the Berlin Wall, the sudden erection of which in 1961 had been a particularly acute source of stress-shock for its nearer neighbours on the "eastern" side. The book only ran to slightly more than 100 pages, and was more concerned with diagnosis than with proposals for treatment or a cure. There were nevertheless indications that one start towards healing for those affected might be to find a way to escape from the east to the west. It was indeed a path along which Müller-Hegemann himself had already taken the most important step, and one that had since been followed by several more formerly senior members of the East German psychology establishment whose positions gave them access to the exceptional travel privileges needed for a trouble free crossing. Since the wall came down in 1989/90 the proliferation of new politically generated mega-walls round the planet has stimulated enduring interest in Müller-Hegemann's work on "Wall Sickness". 1973 was not actually the first time that Müller-Hegemann had labelled as a new psychiatric condition a selection of symptoms which a later generation might have been inclined to see as manifestations of some more generalised condition such as Posttraumatic stress disorder or Survivor guilt. Back in 1964 he had generated headlines in the west by identifying the then little considered mental illness which he called "KZ-Syndrom" ("Concentration Camp syndrome").

Early in 1973 Müller-Hegemann took charge of the Psychotherapy department at the Knappschafts-Krankenhaus (hospital) in Essen-Steel, in the Ruhr region of West Germany. In 1975 he reached retirement age for the hospital position: he continued to live in Essen, working as a self-employed Psychologist until 1988. It was still in Essen, in 1989, that Dietfried Müller-Hegemann, a couple of months ahead of what would have been his eightieth birthday.

== Output (selection) ==
- Ungewöhnliches Symptombild einer Commotionspsychose. Dissertation. Humboldt-Universität zu Berlin, 1937.
- Die Psychotherapie bei schizophrenen Prozessen, Erfahrungen und Probleme. Habilitationsschrift. Humboldt-Universität zu Berlin, 1951.
- Zur Psychologie des deutschen Faschisten. Greifenverlag, Rudolstadt 1955.
- Psychotherapie. Ein Leitfaden für Ärzte und Studierende Verlag Volk und Gesundheit, Berlin 1957.
- Neurologie und Psychiatrie. Lehrbuch für Studierende und Ärzte. Verlag Volk und Gesundheit, Berlin 1966.
- Die Berliner Mauer-Krankheit. Nicolai Verlag, Herford 1973.
- Grundzüge der Psychotherapie. Gustav Fischer Verlag, Stuttgart 1973, ISBN 3-437-00136-1.
- Medizinische Psychotherapie. Gustav Fischer Verlag, Stuttgart 1976.
- Autogene Psychotherapie. Rowohlt Verlag, Reinbek bei Hamburg 1981.
