= Leipzig-Engelsdorf–Leipzig-Connewitz railway =

Railway line in Germany

Overview
- Line number: 6375
- Locale: Saxony, Germany

Service
- Route number: 501.1, 501.3

Technical
- Line length: 7.299 km (4.535 mi)
- Number of tracks: 2: Engelsdorf–Leipzig-Connewitz
- Track gauge: 1,435 mm (4 ft 8 1/2 in) standard gauge
- Minimum radius: 350 m (1,150 ft)
- Electrification: 15 kV/16.7 Hz AC catenary
- Operating speed: 80 km/h (49.7 mph) (maximum)
- Maximum incline: 1.0%

The Leipzig-Engelsdorf–Leipzig-Connewitz railway is a double-track, electrified main line in the Leipzig area in the German state of Saxony. It was originally built as part of the Leipzig Freight Ring (Leipziger Güterring), but since December 2013 it has also been mainly used for the operations of the S-Bahn Mitteldeutschland. At the former Tabakmühle junction the line now transitions into the Tabakmühle junction–Leipzig Bayer Bf railway and the approximately 800 m-long section from Tabakmühle junction to the beginning of Leipzig-Connewitz station is closed.

== History ==
During the reconstruction of the Leipzig railway node after the turn of the twentieth century, including, among other things, the construction of the central Leipzig passenger station and the creation of a Freight Ring, the Royal Saxon State Railways built the Engelsdorf–Leipzig Stötteritz link. The line was intended to connect the former Stötteritz halt, which developed into an important suburban passenger station and freight yard, the Saxon marshalling yard in Engelsdorf and the Prussian transfer station at Leipzig-Schönefeld. With the construction of six bridges and the expansion of the Stotteritz halt, this link was the most elaborate project built by the Royal Saxon State Railways at that time.

Together with further sections in the surrounds of the Engelsdorf marshalling yard, the 4.78 km-long Engelsdorf–Leipzig-Stötteritz railway was opened on 1 May 1906. The line had two tracks from the beginning. A double-track extension of the line to Leipzig-Connewitz station was opened on 1 October 1912—although at the time the 3.87 km-long section was formally considered to be the third and fourth track of the (parallel) Leipzig Hbf–Leipzig-Connewitz railway. The planned reconstruction of the Stötteritz station was implemented up to 1914.

As part of a larger electrification project in the Leipzig–Böhlen area at the beginning of the 1960s, Deutsche Reichsbahn electrified the Engelsdorf–Leipzig-Connewitz line at 15 kV AC and electrical operations were inaugurated on 2 October 1961.

As part of the provision of additional network enhancements for the Leipzig City Tunnel project, numerous individual measures were implemented in 2012/2013 around the Leipzig-Engelsdorf–Tabakmühle junction section to modernise the infrastructure and to improve passenger comfort. These included among other things:

- increasing the speed of the line from 60 km/h to 80 km/h (south of Leipzig-Stötteritz)
- construction of a new Leipzig-Anger-Crottendorf halt (Haltepunkt) in the area of Zweinaundorfer Straße (replacing an abandoned halt on the Leipzig Hbf–Leipzig-Connewitz line)
- construction of a new Leipzig Völkerschlachtdenkmal halt with an island platform and entrance stairs to the southern footpath of Prager Straße and lift to the northern footpath of Prager Straße (replacing an abandoned halt on the Leipzig Hbf–Leipzig-Connewitz line with only one platform edge and without direct access to Prager Straße)
- conversion and modernisation of the railway tracks in Leipzig-Stötteritz station, including a lift and stairs from Papiermühlstraße as well as changes to the tracks to allow the termination, reversal and starting of S-Bahn trains
- decommissioning of both tracks of line 6375 between Tabakmühle junction and Leipzig-Connewitz (the parallel running tracks of line 6361 between Leipzig Hbf and Leipzig-Connewitz were retained in this section).

The reconstruction and modernisation works were carried out during a closure of the line for about a year from 24 November 2012. The refurbished and modernised facilities were built together with the Leipzig City Tunnel, which was opened on 15 December 2013. The Leipzig-Engelsdorf–Leipzig-Stötteritz section has been used since then for mixed traffic, but the section south of Leipzig-Stötteritz station has been used only for passenger traffic.

== Outlook ==
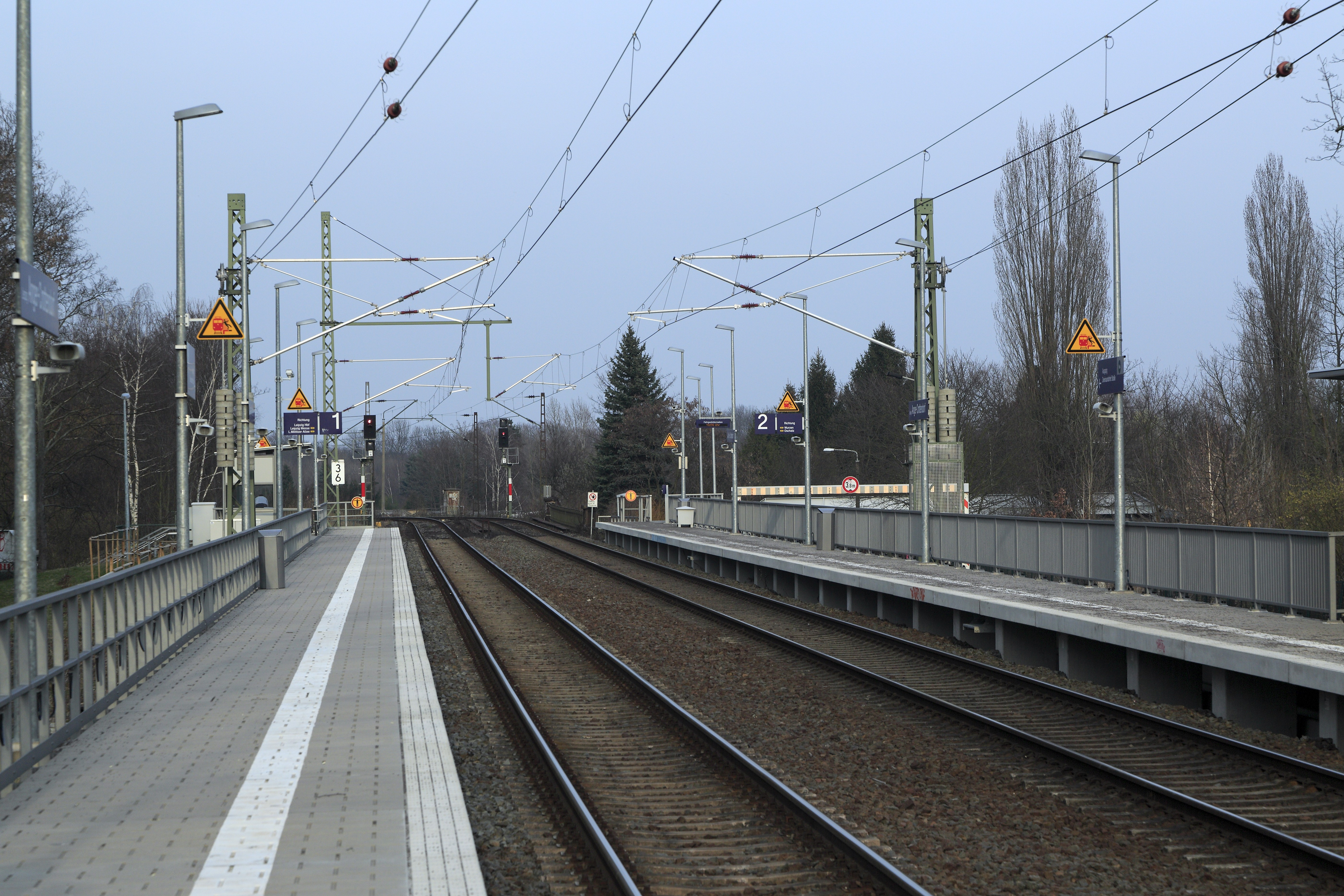
Leipzig-Anger-Crottendorf halt opened in 2013. This is served by the S-Bahn Mitteldeutschland and during the upgrading of the line in 2018–2021 it will be rebuilt as a barrier-free halt with a central platform (March 2015)

DB Netz AG intends to implement a number of measures from April 2018 to February 2021 as part of a complex project for the comprehensive modernisation of the line between the stations of Leipzig-Engelsdorf and Leipzig-Stötteritz. These include, among other things:

- the reconstruction of Leipzig-Anger-Crottendorf halt; the latter will receive a new 140 metre-long central platform, which will replace the two current outer platforms, as well as a lift for barrier-free access to the platform and a tactile guidance system
- the reconstruction of seven railway bridges, which are over 100 years old, over streets, including:
  - Cunnersdorfer Straße
  - Zweenfurther Straße
  - Rietzschkebach
  - Zweinaundorfer Straße
  - Oststraße
- the construction of new supporting walls
- the straightening of the track on the Oststraße overbridge, partly using the route of the now partly abandoned Leipzig Hbf–Leipzig-Connewitz railway
- the construction of about 2300 metres of noise barriers.

During the approximately three-year period of construction, only one-track operation will be possible and a blockade is foreseen for a period of about four weeks in the spring of 2020. An operating speed on the section of 80 km/h (formerly 60 km/h) will be possible after the completion of the project.

== Route ==
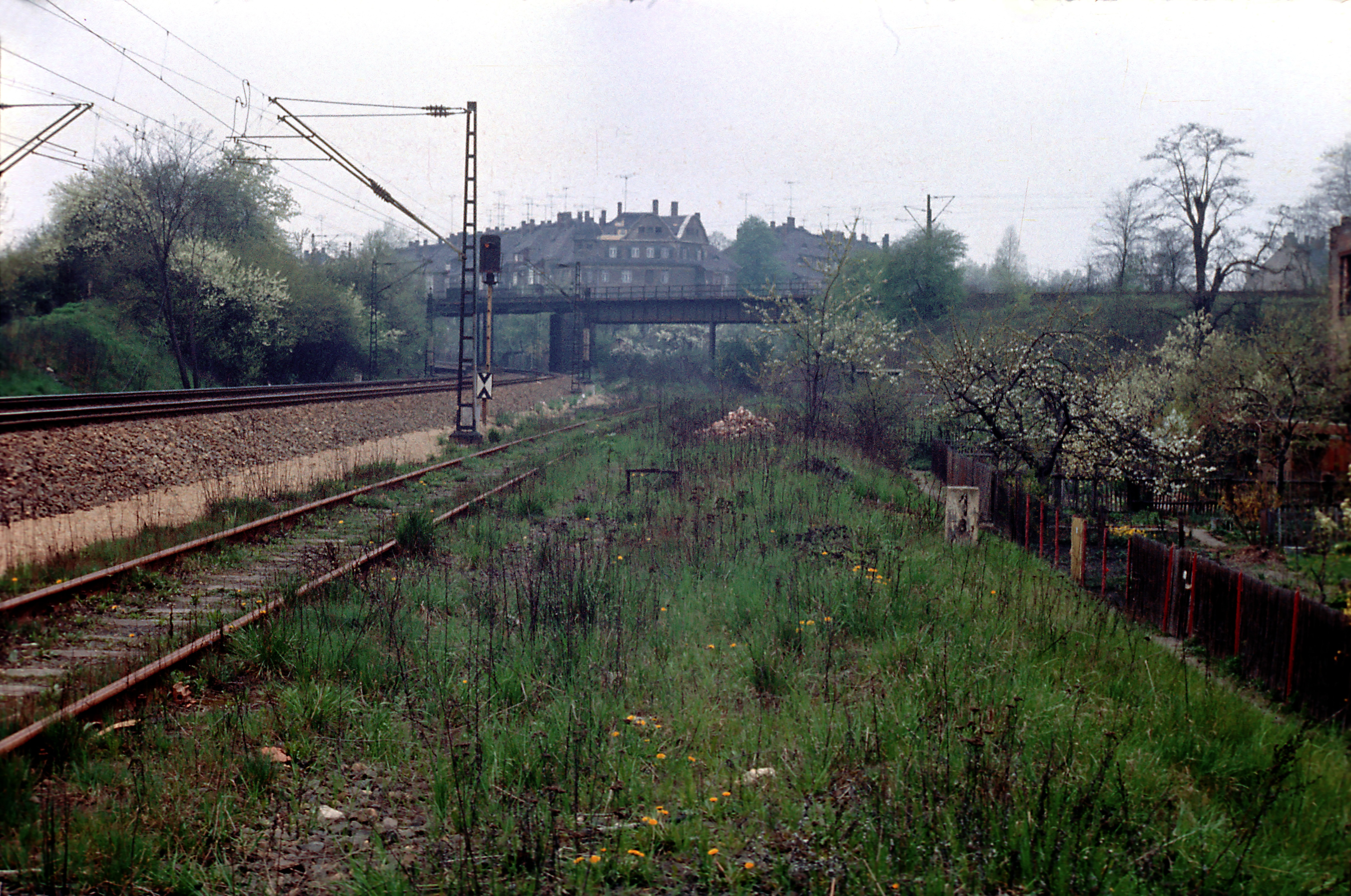
On the left are the tracks of the Engelsdorf–Leipzig-Stötteritz line at Anger junction, which has been electrified since 1961, ahead is Stötteritz; to the right in the middle of the picture is the track to the Eilenburger Bahnhof (Eilenburg station), which still existed at the time. The Leipzig Hbf–Leipzig-Connewitz railway ran over the bridge, which has been dismantled in the meantime. (May 1983)

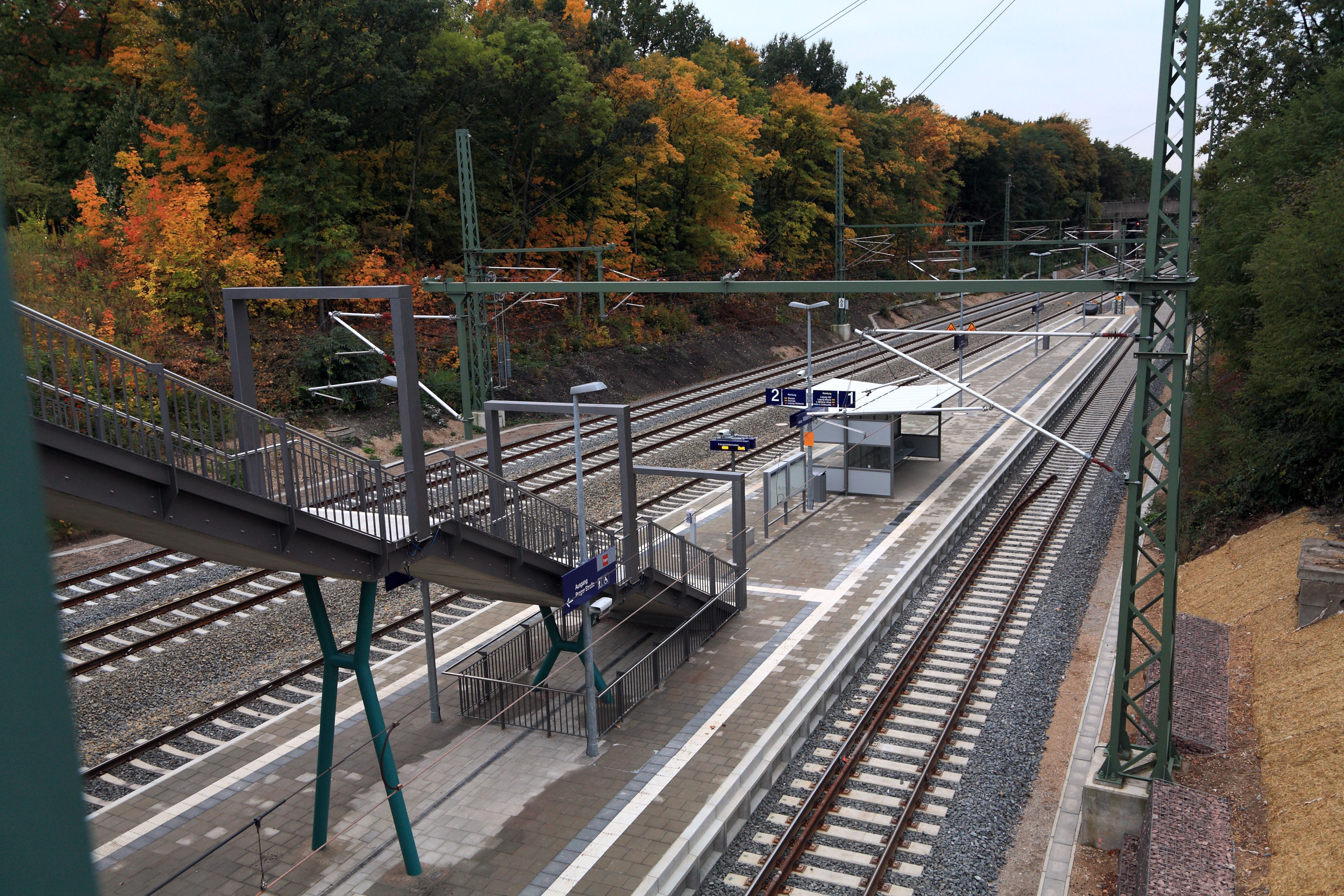
The Engelsdorf–Leipzig-Connewitz line at the Völkerschlachtdenkmal halt, opened in 2013, in the cutting between the Monument to the Battle of the Nations (Völkerschlachtdenkmal) and the old Trade Fair grounds (Alte Messe), seen from the Prager Straße bridge, looking towards Connewitz; to the left are the tracks now exclusively used by freight traffic of the Leipzig Hbf–Leipzig-Connewitz railway (October 2013)

The Engelsdorf–Leipzig-Connewitz railway and the line to the former Prussian transfer station at Leipzig-Schönefeld both leave the Engelsdorf marshalling yard and run to the west in parallel. While the latter line curves to the north towards the line from the former Eilenburger Bahnhof, the Stötteritz line runs in a southwestern curve also towards the Eilenburg line (in the other direction), and continues to run parallel with it, crosses three streets and after about 1.8 km joins the Eilenburg line at Anger junction. The lines were, and still are, linked to each other, although the line no longer continues to the Eilenburger Bahnhof (the station at the end of the line from Eilenburg).

Approximately 300 m further on, just after crossing Zweinaundorfer Straße, is the new Leipzig-Anger-Crottendorf halt, which was moved from the Leipzig Hbf–Leipzig-Connewitz railway and opened in December 2013. The line now crosses the closed and, in this section, dismantled Leipzig Hbf–Leipzig-Connewitz railway, crosses the Oststraße and reaches Leipzig-Stötteritz station immediately after crossing Papiermühlstraße.

It now runs parallel to the still operating section of the former Leipzig–Hof connecting line, eventually crosses Prager Straße and continues down the slope. Here it passes through Leipzig-Völkerschlachtdenkmal halt, which was also moved in 2013 and gives access to both the Monument to the Battle of the Nations and the old Trade Fair ground (Alte Messe). After crossing more streets, the Engelsdorf–Leipzig-Connewitz railway now runs on to the Tabakmühle junction–Leipzig Bayer Bf railway at the former Tabakmühle junction near the underpass under Zwickauer Strasse without crossing any sets of points. The original continuation of the line to Leipzig-Connewitz station was dismantled during the so-called additional network enhancements for the Leipzig City Tunnel project and the Tabakmühle junction no longer exists.

== Operations ==
=== Until the reconstruction in 2012/2013 ===
According to the original concept as part of the Leipzig Freight Ring, the line was used mainly for rail freight. Besides its main purpose, carrying rail freight between Leipzig-Engelsdorf station and the southerly course of the Leipzig–Hof railway, it also carried local and transferred freight to the Bayerischen Bahnhof (Bavarian station).

Of 23 freight trains, which were marshalled in the early 1930s on weekdays at the Bavarian station, and 25 freight trains, which were disbanded there, the following operations among others ran over the Engelsdorf–Tabakmühle junction section:

- 3 trains to and 4 trains from Leipzig-Wahren (including 3 circuits to and from Engelsdorf)
- 3 trains to and 6 trains from Leipzig-Schönefeld
- 4 trains to and 2 trains from Engelsdorf
- 2 trains to and 1 train from Leipzig Hauptbahnhof
- 1 train to and 1 train from the Leipzig-Dresden freight yard

Scheduled passenger services never ran over the line until 2013, but from the outset the line was prepared to handle for passenger services. They were used especially for trains between the Trade Fair and the Bavarian station. During the division of Germany, a daily pair of transit trains (Transitzug) between Munich and West Berlin ran between Connewitz and Anger junction. The train pair carried the train numbers of 308 and 309 from 1972 until the end of the transit train services with the reunification of Germany.

=== Since December 2013 ===
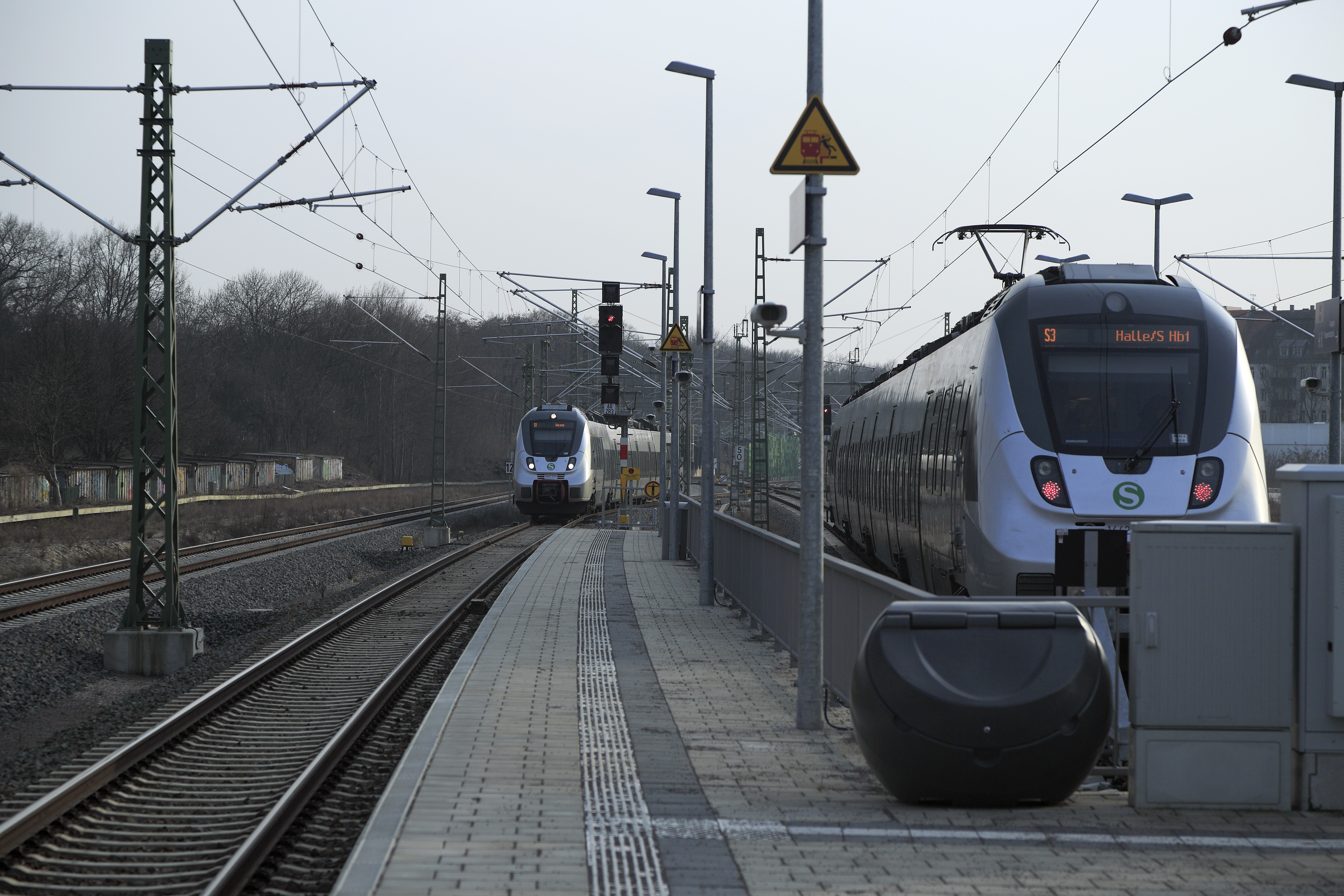
Electric multiple unit of the S-Bahn Mitteldeutschland at the rebuilt Leipzig-Stötteritz station. On the left edge of the picture is the remaining part of the Leipzig Hbf–Leipzig-Connewitz railway, which is used exclusively for freight traffic. (March 2015)

In the 2015 timetable, local rail passenger services on the line are operated as lines S1 and S3 of the S-Bahn Mitteldeutschland. The northern section between Engelsdorf and Leipzig-Stötteritz station is served by line S1 at 30-minute intervals, while the southern section from Stötteritz station over the former Tabakmühle junction towards Leipzig City Tunnel is served by an overlay of lines S1 and S3, providing services every 10 minutes. Bombardier Talent 2 electric multiple units are used.

The section between Engelsdorf, Anger junction and Leipzig-Stötteritz station is also used by freight traffic. South of Leipzig-Stötteritz station, the freight trains use the remaining, parallel tracks of the Leipzig Hbf–Leipzig-Connewitz railway around Leipzig-Connewitz and on to the Leipzig–Hof railway
