= Leipzig Anger-Crottendorf station =

Railway station in Leipzig, Germany

Leipzig Anger-Crottendorf
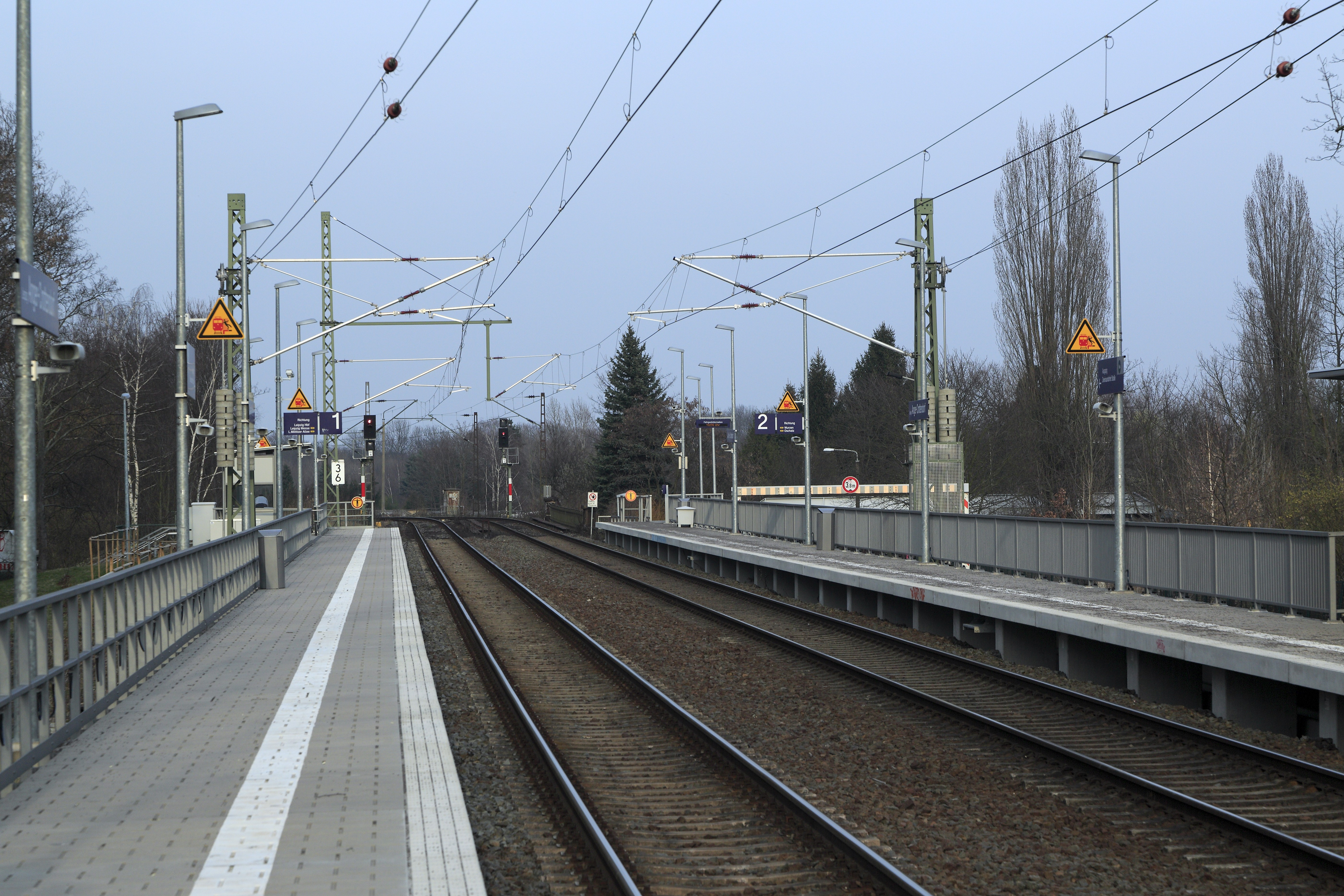
- The new stop along Leipzig-Engelsdorf–Leipzig-Connewitz railway, which was opened on the 15th of December 2013

General information
- Location: Güterring 2, Leipzig, Saxony; Germany
- Coordinates: 51.3326°N 12.4204°E
- Lines: Hauptbahnhof–Connewitz (until 24 Nov 2012); Engelsdorf–Connewitz (since 15 Dec 2013)
- Platforms: 1
- Tracks: 1

Other information
- Station code: 146
- DS100 code: LACF
- IBNR: 8010008
- Category: 6
- Fare zone: MDV: 110
- Website: www.bahnhof.de

Services
Preceding station	Mitteldeutschland S-Bahn	Following station
Leipzig-Stötteritz towards Halle-Nietleben	S 3	Leipzig-Engelsdorf towards Wurzen or Oschatz
Location
- Location within Saxony Location within Germany Location within Europe

Leipzig Anger-Crottendorf is a railway station in the city of Leipzig, Germany. The station was located on the Leipzig Hbf–Leipzig-Connewitz railway until its closure in November 2012. As part of City Tunnel network enhancements it was rebuilt thereafter a few meters east at the Leipzig-Engelsdorf–Leipzig-Stötteritz section of the Leipzig Freight Ring and reopened along with Leipzig City Tunnel on 15 December 2013. The station is served by the S-Bahn Mitteldeutschland since then, train services are operated by Deutsche Bahn.

== Reconstruction since 2019 ==
Since 2019 the station has been under reconstruction. Both platforms have been deconstructed and will be replaced by a new central platform. The bridges crossing Zweinaundorfer Straße are being rebuilt in shifted positions and the tracks will get a slightly different layout, in order to increase the speed limit from 60 to 80 km/h. During 2021 only one platform and one track is being operated. The project is planned to be completed in 2024.

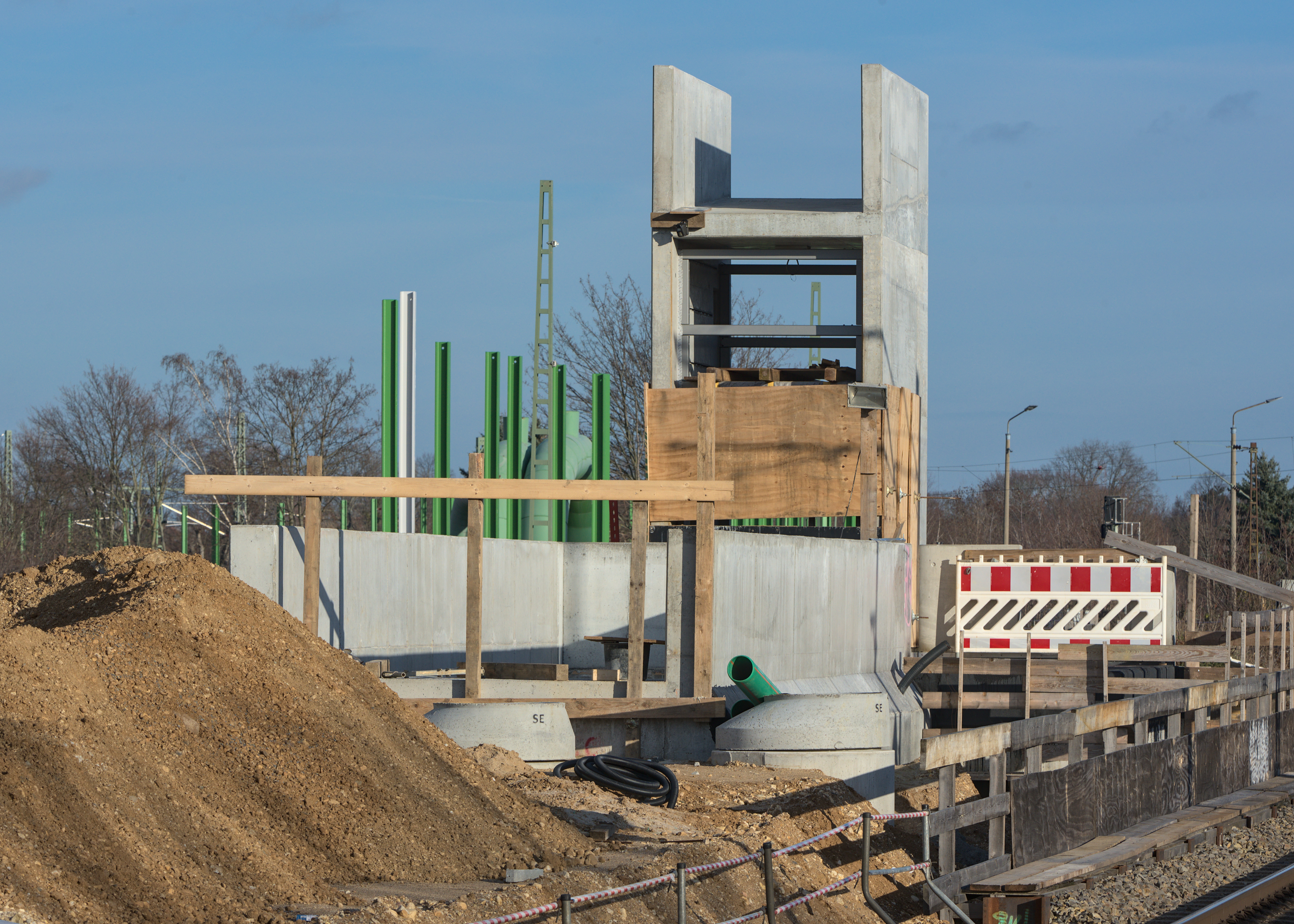
Carcass of a passenger lift

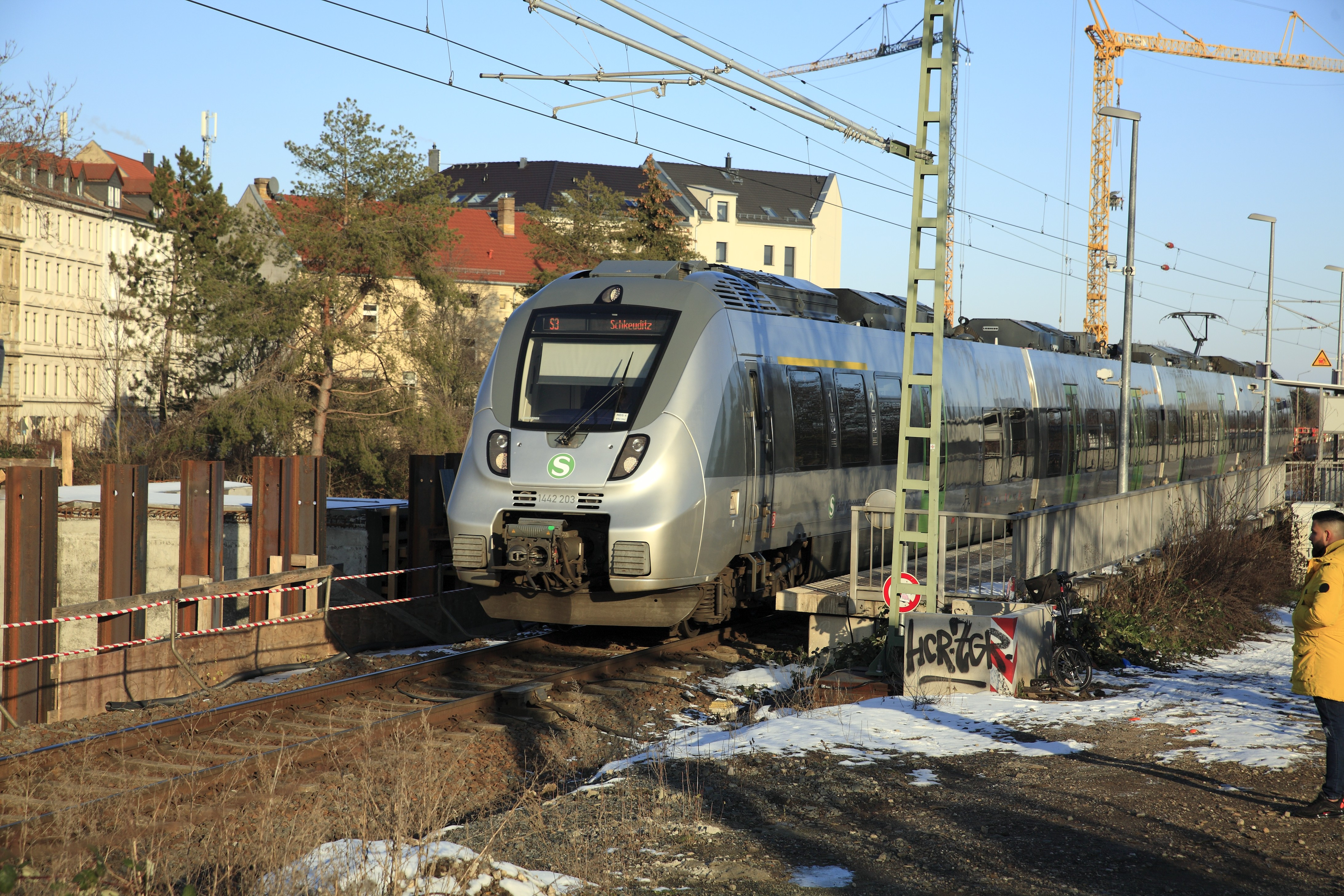
Train departing southbound

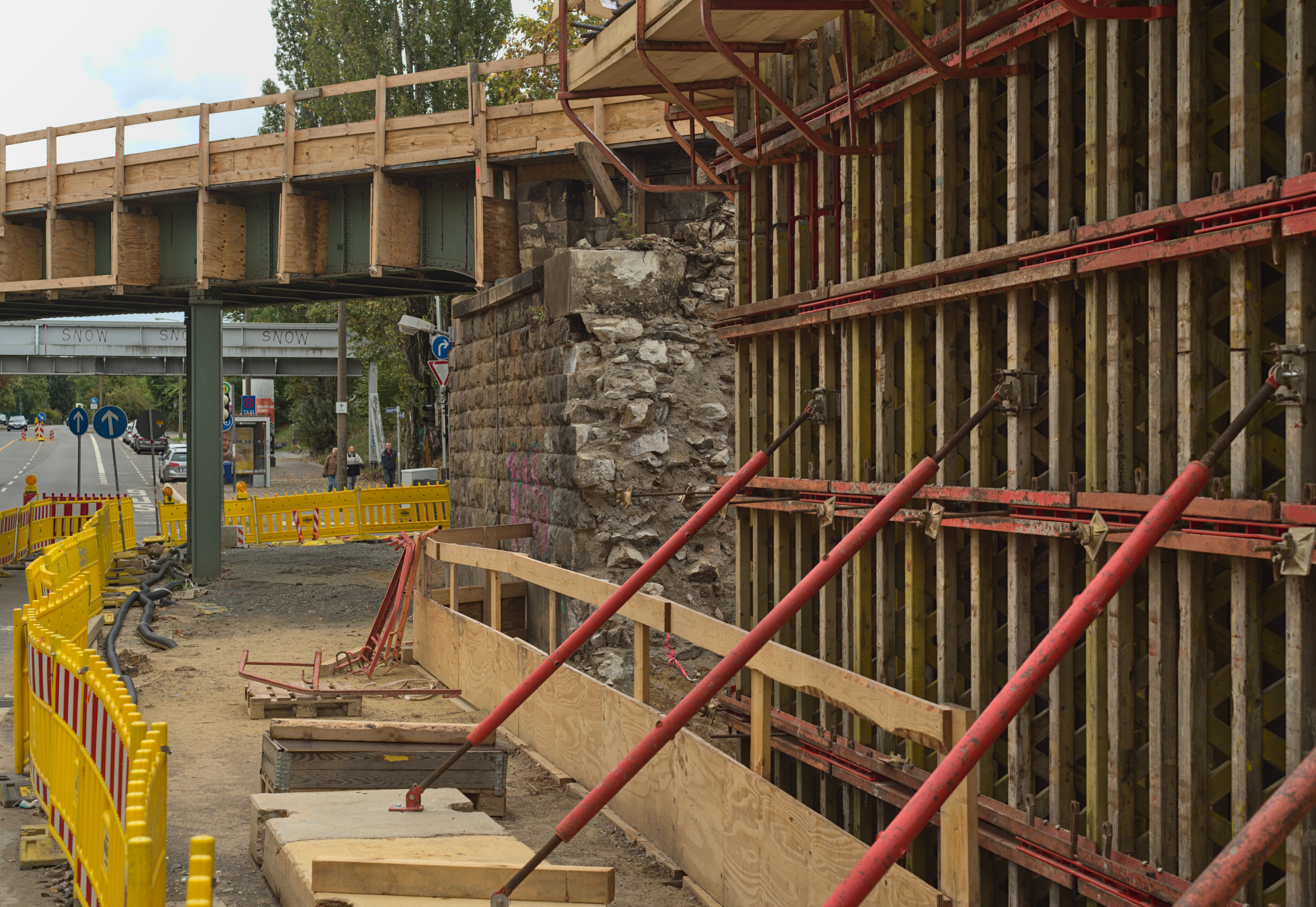
new railway embankment

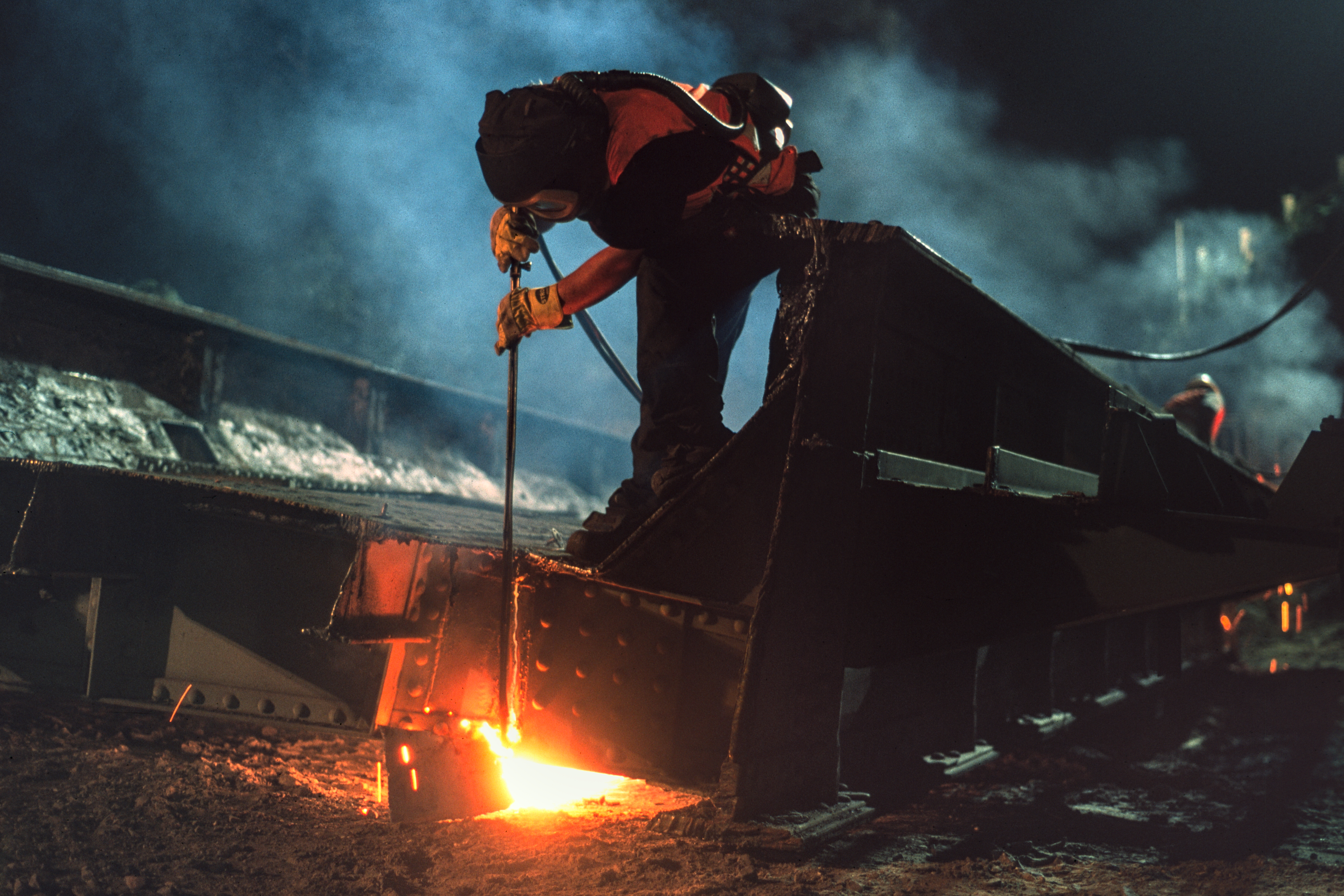
Oxyacetylene cutting to scrap one of the old railway bridges

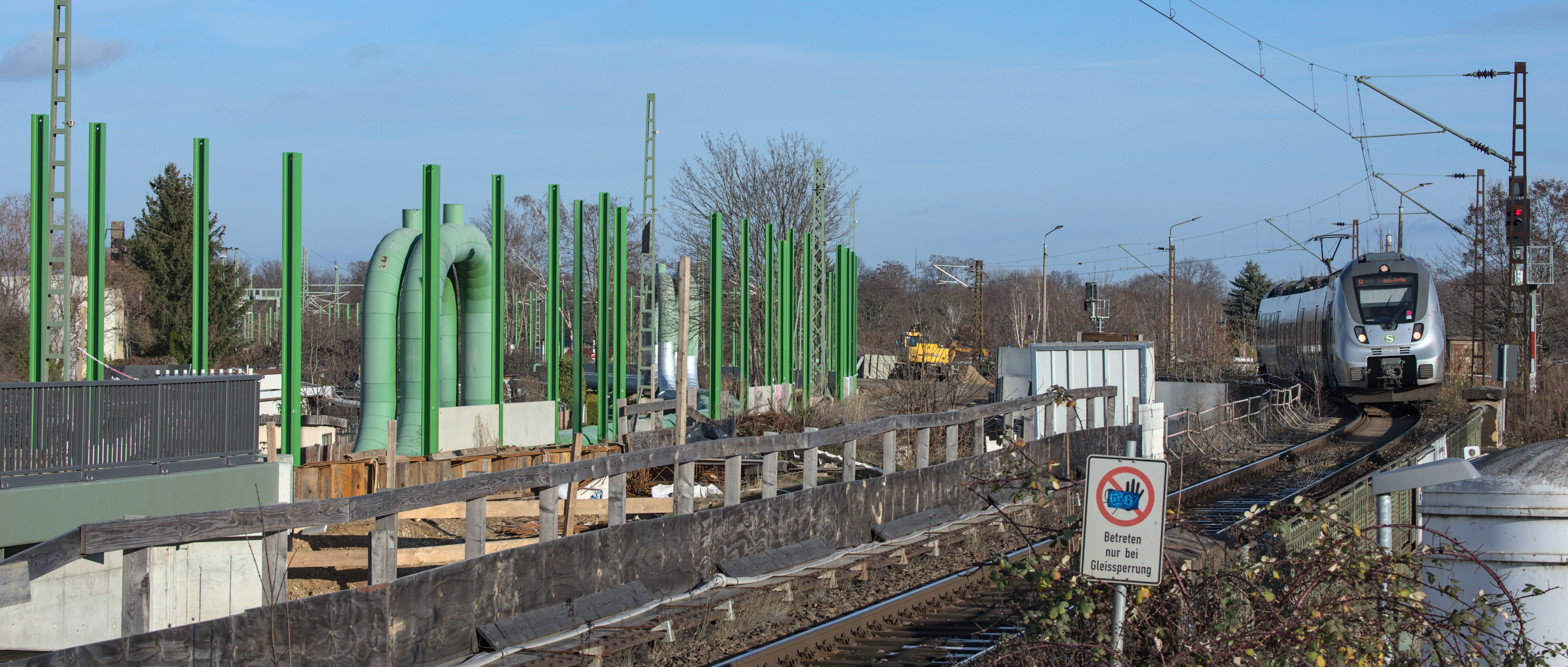
noise barriers are installed

== Train services ==
S-Bahn Mitteldeutschland services currently call at the station.
