= Leipzig Slevogtstraße station =

Railway station in Leipzig, Germany

Leipzig Slevogtstraße
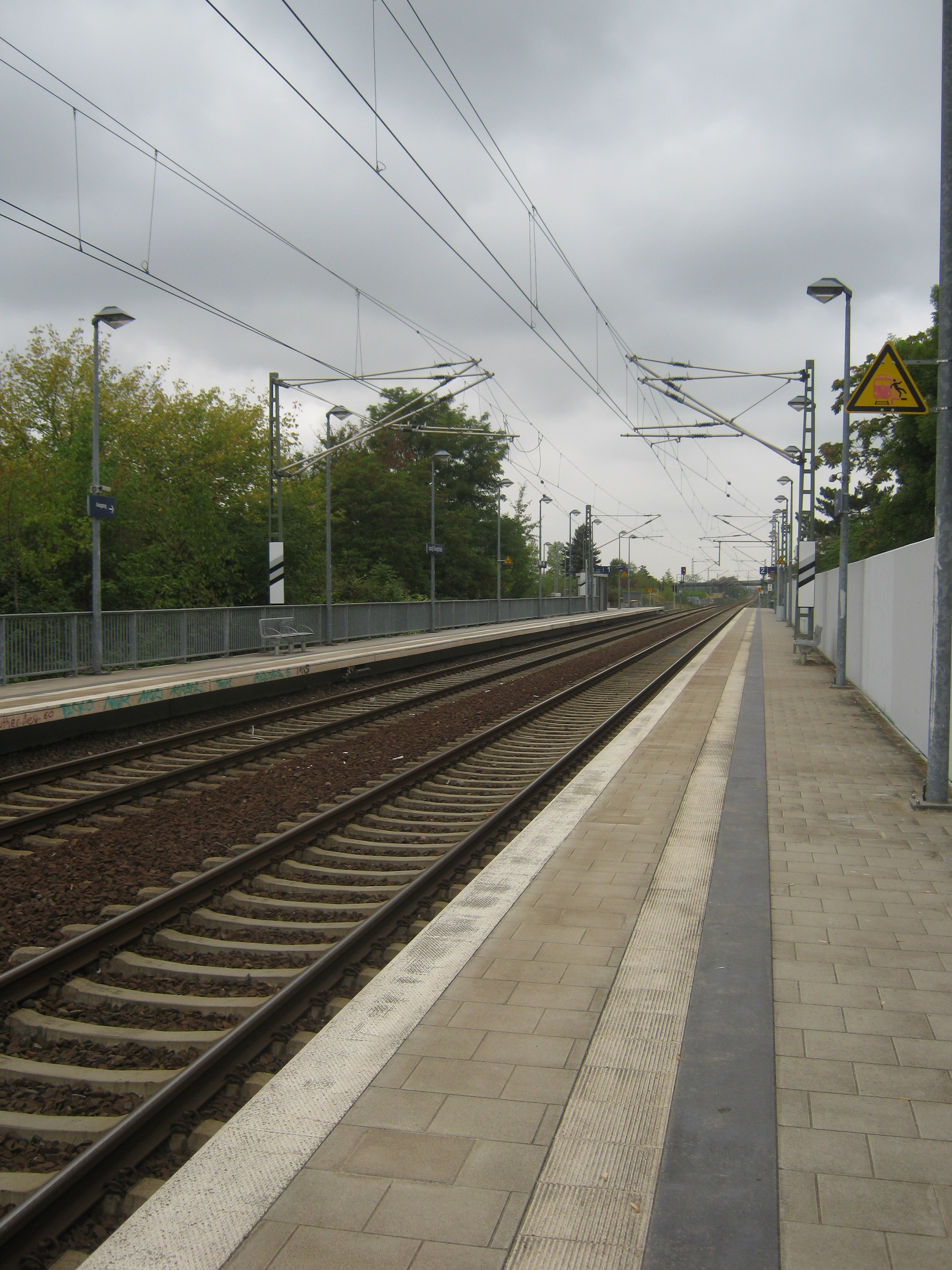
- 2018

General information
- Location: Slevogtstraße; 04159 Leipzig; Saxony; Germany
- Coordinates: 51.3728°N 12.3449°E
- Owner: DB Netz
- Operator: DB Station&Service
- Lines: Leipzig-Wahren–Leipzig Hbf railway (KBS 505.10)
- Platforms: 2 side platforms
- Tracks: 2
- Train operators: S-Bahn Mitteldeutschland

Other information
- Station code: 8096
- DS100 code: LSVS
- IBNR: 8012204
- Category: 6
- Fare zone: MDV: 110
- Website: www.bahnhof.de

Services
Preceding station	Mitteldeutschland S-Bahn	Following station
Leipzig-Wahren towards Halle-Nietleben	S 3	Leipzig Olbrichtstraße towards Wurzen or Oschatz
Location
- Location within Saxony

Leipzig Slevogtstraße station is a railway station in Leipzig, capital city of Saxony, Germany, located near Slevogtstraße.
