= Leipzig-Völkerschlachtdenkmal station =

Railway station in Leipzig, Germany

Leipzig Völkerschlachtdenkmal
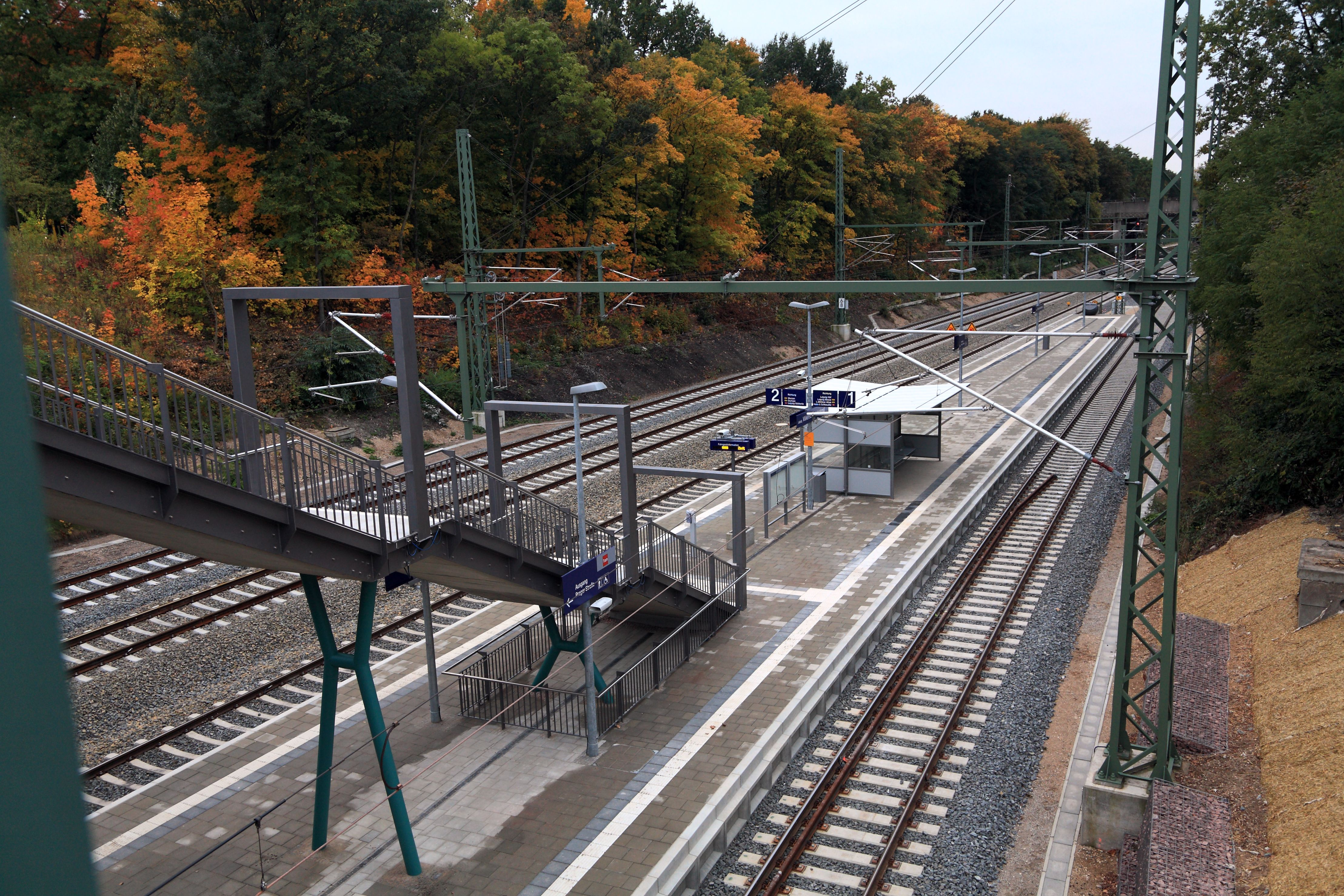
- Leipzig-Völkerschlachtdenkmal station, which opened in December 2013 with access from Prager Straße, view towards southeast.

General information
- Location: Leipzig, Saxony; Germany
- Coordinates: 51.318476°N 12.405936°E
- Lines: Hauptbahnhof–Connewitz (until 24 Nov 2012); Engelsdorf–Connewitz (since 15 Dec 2013)
- Platforms: 2

Other information
- Station code: 3632
- Category: 6
- Fare zone: MDV: 110

History
- Opened: 3 March 1968; 58 years ago
- Electrified: at opening
- Former names: 1968–1970 Technische Messe; 1970–1989 Messegelände; 1989–1996 Leipzig Messegelände

Services
Preceding station	Mitteldeutschland S-Bahn	Following station
Leipzig MDR towards Leipzig Miltitzer Allee	S 1	Leipzig-Stötteritz Terminus
Leipzig MDR towards Dessau Hbf or Lutherstadt Wittenberg Hbf	S 2	Leipzig-Stötteritz Terminus
Leipzig MDR towards Halle-Nietleben	S 3	Leipzig-Stötteritz towards Wurzen or Oschatz
Location

Leipzig-Völkerschlachtdenkmal is a railway station in the city of Leipzig, Germany. The station was opened in 1968 and located on the Leipzig Hbf–Leipzig-Connewitz railway until its closure in November 2012. As part of City Tunnel network enhancements it was rebuilt thereafter a few meters northeast at the former Leipzig-Stötteritz–Leipzig-Engelsdorf section of the Leipzig Freight Ring and reopened along with Leipzig City Tunnel on 15 December 2013.

The station is served by S-Bahn Mitteldeutschland since then, train services are operated by DB Regio.

The station is located near the Monument to the Battle of the Nations (German: Völkerschlachtdenkmal).

== Train services ==
S-Bahn Mitteldeutschland services currently call at the station.
