= Leipzig-Stötteritz station =

Railway halt in Leipzig, Germany

Leipzig Stötteritz
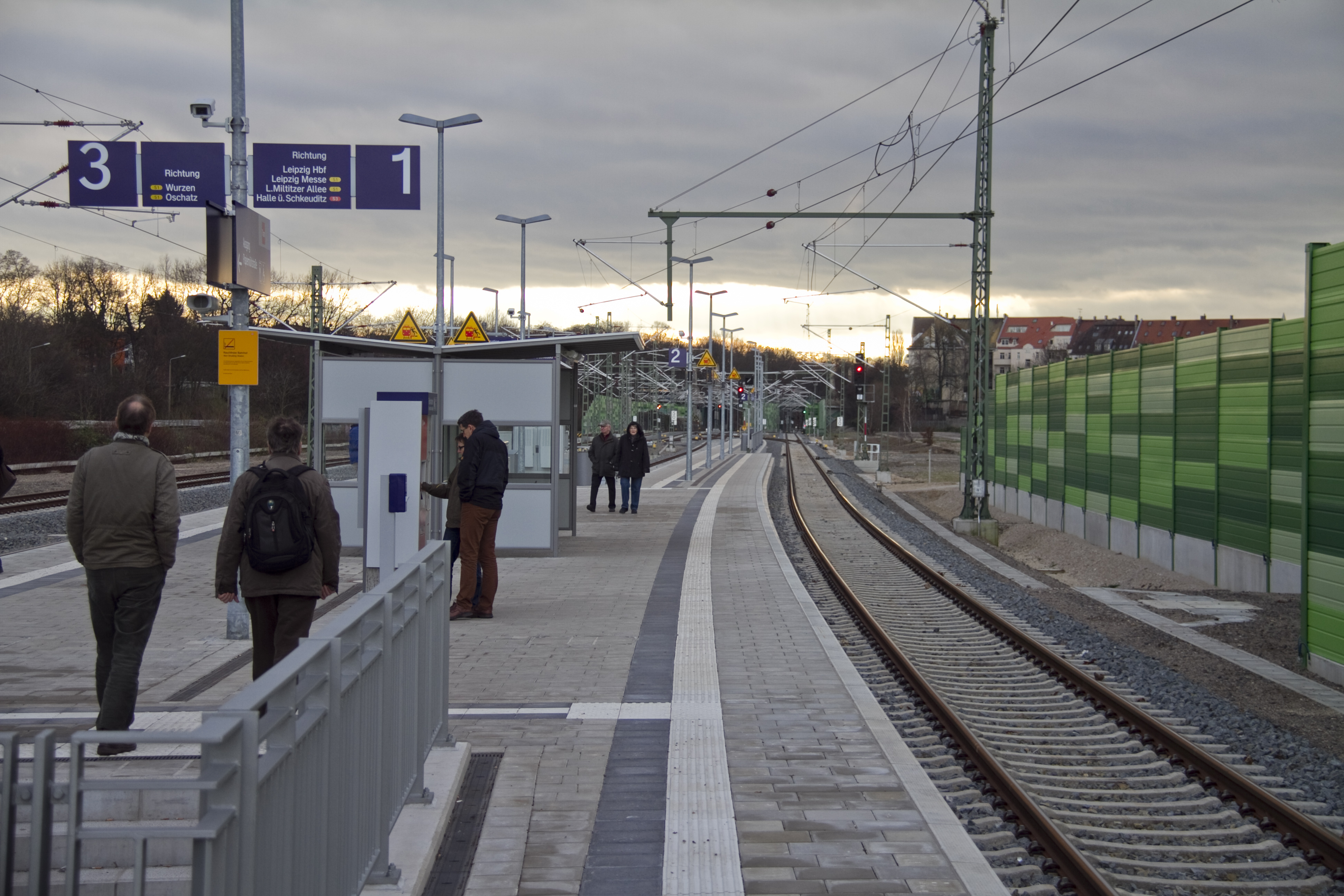
- Leipzig-Stötteritz station

General information
- Location: Leipzig, Saxony; Germany
- Coordinates: 51.324386°N 12.411511°E
- Lines: Hauptbahnhof–Connewitz; Engelsdorf–Connewitz
- Platforms: 3

Other information
- Station code: 3646
- DS100 code: LLST
- Category: 5
- Fare zone: MDV: 110
- Website: www.bahnhof.de

History
- Opened: 1 May 1893; 133 years ago
- Electrified: 2 October 1961; 64 years ago
- Former names: 1891–1897 Stötteritz

Services
Preceding station	Mitteldeutschland S-Bahn	Following station
Leipzig-Völkerschlachtdenkmal towards Leipzig Miltitzer Allee	S 1	Terminus
Leipzig-Völkerschlachtdenkmal towards Dessau Hbf or Lutherstadt Wittenberg Hbf	S 2	Terminus
Leipzig-Völkerschlachtdenkmal towards Halle-Nietleben	S 3	Leipzig Anger-Crottendorf towards Wurzen or Oschatz
Location
- Location within Saxony Location within Germany Location within Europe

Leipzig-Stötteritz is a railway station in the city of Leipzig, Germany. The station opened on 1 December 1891 and is located on the Leipzig Hbf–Leipzig-Connewitz and Leipzig-Engelsdorf–Leipzig-Connewitz railways. Since December 2013 the station is served by the S-Bahn Mitteldeutschland, with train services operated by DB Regio.

The station was rebuilt and modernised from October 2011, in preparation for the S-Bahn Mitteldeutschland. This included the building of lifts, to make the station accessible to all.

== Train services ==
S-Bahn Mitteldeutschland services currently call at the station.
