= Leipzig Olbrichtstraße station =

Railway stop in Leipzig, Germany

Leipzig Olbrichtstraße
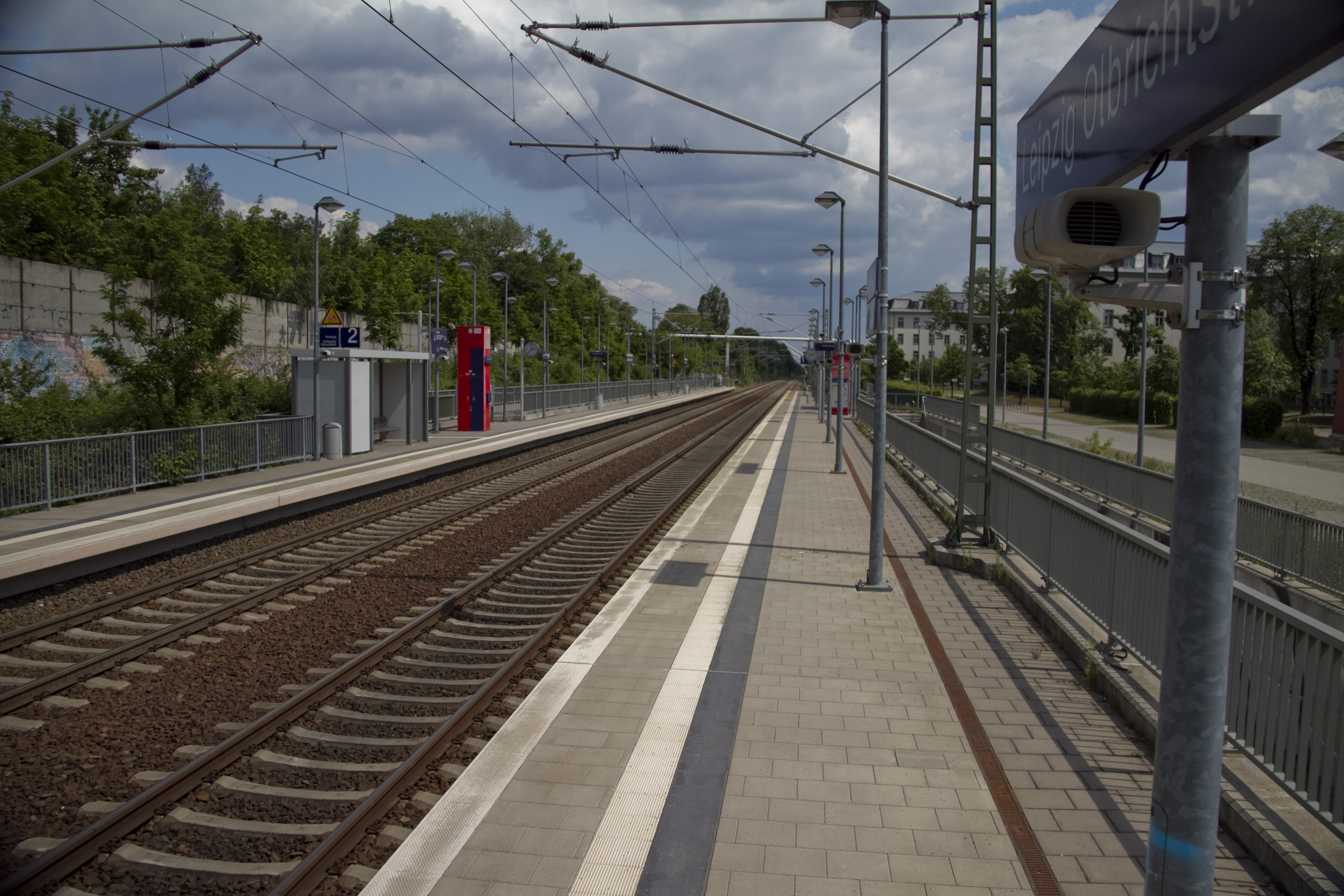
- 2012

General information
- Location: Olbrichtstraße/Tresckowstraße; 04157 Leipzig; Saxony; Germany
- Coordinates: 51°22′12″N 12°21′13″E
- Owner: DB Netz
- Operator: DB Station&Service
- Lines: Leipzig-Wahren–Leipzig Hbf railway (KBS 505.10)
- Platforms: 2 side platforms
- Tracks: 2
- Train operators: S-Bahn Mitteldeutschland

Other information
- Station code: 8094
- DS100 code: LSEL
- IBNR: 8012181
- Category: 6
- Fare zone: MDV: 110
- Website: www.bahnhof.de

Services
Preceding station	Mitteldeutschland S-Bahn	Following station
Leipzig Slevogtstraße towards Halle-Nietleben	S 3	Leipzig-Gohlis towards Wurzen or Oschatz
Location
- Location within Saxony

Leipzig Olbrichtstraße station is a railway station in Leipzig, Saxony, Germany, located near Olbrichtstraße.
