= Leipzig-Wahren–Leipzig-Engelsdorf railway =

Railway line in Leipzig, Germany

Leipzig-Wahren–Leipzig-Engelsdorf

Overview
- Line number: 6369
- Locale: Saxony, Germany

Technical
- Line length: 17.828 km (11.078 mi)
- Track gauge: 1,435 mm (4 ft 8 1/2 in) standard gauge
- Minimum radius: 325 m (1,066 ft)
- Electrification: 15 kV/16.7 Hz AC catenary
- Maximum incline: 13.9

The Leipzig-Wahren–Leipzig-Engelsdorf railway is a two-track, electrified main line in the German state of Saxony, which forms the northern part of the Leipzig Freight Ring. It is mainly used by east–west freight traffic passing through the Leipzig railway node. The only parts in use are the section from Wiederitzsch to Leipzig-Engelsdorf and the section between the Leipzig-Wahren marshalling yard and junction L, which was established in 2004 as a result of the recommissioning of the Leipzig-Wahren–Leipzig Hbf railway for passenger traffic. With the transfer of freight traffic to this link and the opening of the Gröbers–Leipzig/Halle Airport–Leipzig Hbf section, it was possible to connect the former Wiederitzsch–Wahren rail tracks and the Wiederitzsch–Leutzsch freight tracks for freight operations.

== History ==
The line was built by the Prussian state railways and the Royal Saxon State Railways during the reconstruction of the Leipzig railway node after the turn of the twentieth century. The section from Leipzig-Wahren to Schönefeld was built for the Prussian state railways and the remaining section to Engelsdorf was built by the Royal Saxon State Railways. The whole line was opened on 1 May 1906.

Shortly before the First World War, the line was electrified as far as Leipzig-Schönefeld. Electric operations started on 1 May 1914. Due to the war, electrical operations were soon abandoned and the catenary was dismantled.

Ownership of the whole line was transferred to Deutsche Reichsbahn on 1 April 1920. The former Prussian part was managed by Reichsbahndirektion (RBD; Reichsbahn railway division) of Halle and the Saxon section by Reichsbahndirektion Dresden. After a change in railway division borders in 1934, the whole line came under the administration of the Reichsbahndirektion Halle.

The line was re-electrified shortly after the First World War. Electric train operations commenced as far as Schönefeld on 25 January 1921. Electrical operation on the entire line to Engelsdorf commenced on 8 October 1922. This was the first former Saxon railway line to be electrified.

The catenary was dismantled again after the Second World War. Electric train operations ended on 31 March 1946 and all facilities were dismantled shortly afterwards to provide reparations to the Soviet Union. Electrical operations on the line recommenced on 29 May 1959.

Between Leipzig-Wahren and Wiederitzsch only the pair of tracks of the Magdeburg–Leipzig Messe Süd railway is used for freight operations. In February 2016, a contract was let for the rebuilding of the Leipzig-Mockau yard and the renewal of several railway bridges.
