= Leipzig-Wahren station =

Railway station in Saxony, Germany

Leipzig Wahren
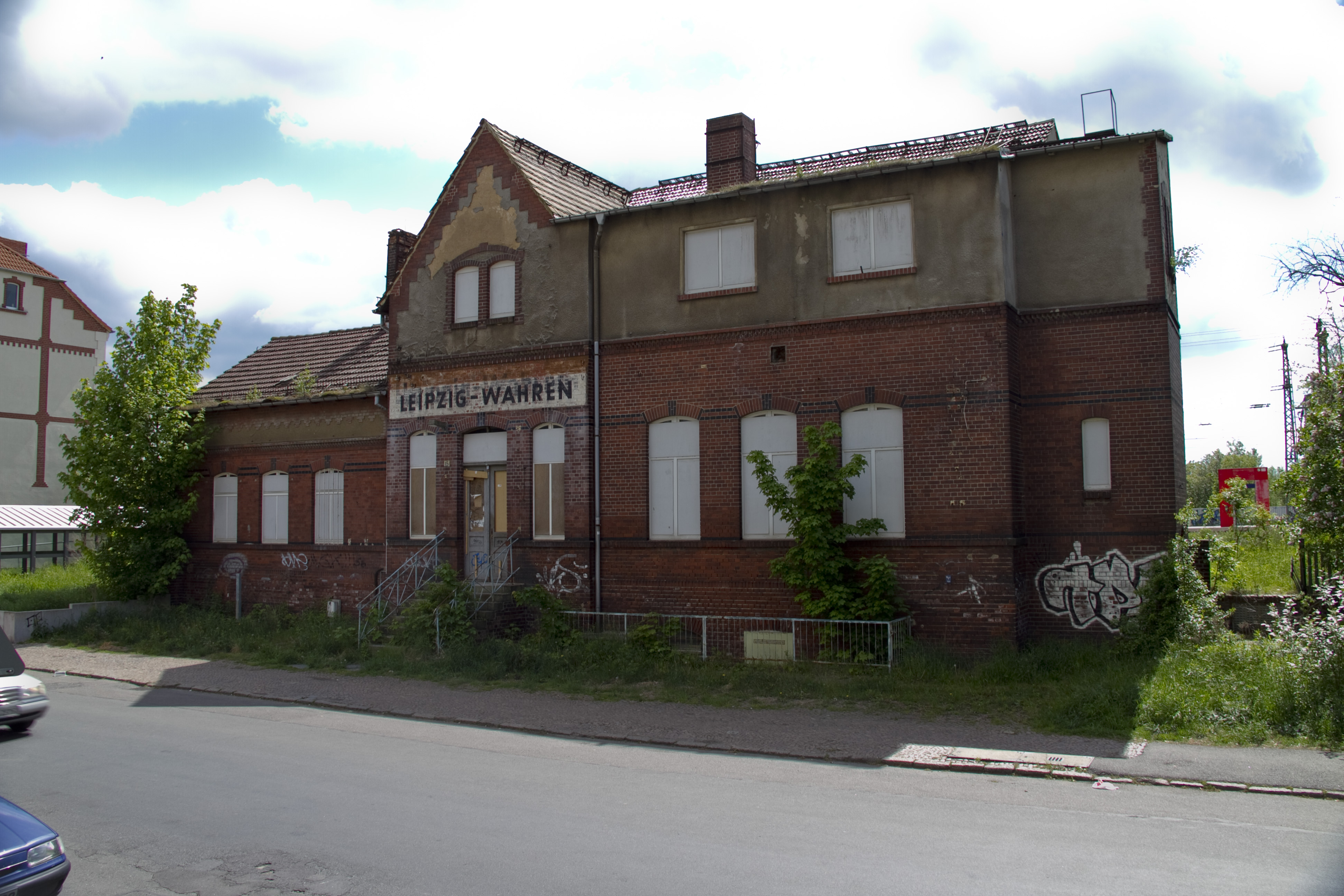
- Old entrance building

General information
- Location: Lützschenaer Str., Wahren, Saxony; Germany
- Coordinates: 51°22′51″N 12°19′18″E
- Lines: Magdeburg–Leipzig (km 111.36); Leipzig-Wahren–Leipzig Hbf (km 1.55); Leipzig-Wahren–Engelsdorf (km 0.00); Leipzig-Leutzsch–Leutzsch (km 2.8)
- Platforms: 2

Construction
- Accessible: Yes

Other information
- Station code: 3649
- DS100 code: LLW
- IBNR: 8012197
- Category: 5
- Fare zone: MDV: 110
- Website: www.bahnhof.de

History
- Opened: 1884
Location

Leipzig-Wahren station is a station in the Leipzig suburb of Wahren in the German state of Saxony. At the beginning of the 20th century, a large freight yard was developed at it. Until the end of marshalling of trains on 31 December 1994, the Leipzig-Wahren freight yard was along with Engelsdorf (b Leipzig) one of the two major marshalling yards in the Leipzig rail node.

Today the station has two passenger halts, Leipzig-Wahren and Leipzig-Lützschena, as well as a transshipment facility for combined transport.

== History ==
Wahren station was opened on the Magdeburg–Leipzig railway, initially only for passenger traffic, on 1 August 1884.

At the beginning of the 20th century, all marshalling yards were moved from central Leipzig to the suburbs. This included the Leipzig-Wahren freight yard, which was opened on 9 April 1905. The Prussian state railways connected the station with the Leipzig-Leutzsch–Leipzig-Wahren and the Leipzig-Wahren–Leipzig-Schönefeld lines, which formed part of the Leipzig Freight Ring. At the same time, the Leipzig-Wahren locomotive depot (Bahnbetriebswerk) was built on the north side on the yard. After the opening of Leipzig Hauptbahnhof in 1912, most traffic from Magdeburg ran from Wahren via Wiederitzsch and the Freight Ring to Leipzig and the old direct line was only used for freight traffic. The passenger train tracks were routed to the north of the tracks to the freight yard and the locomotive depot.

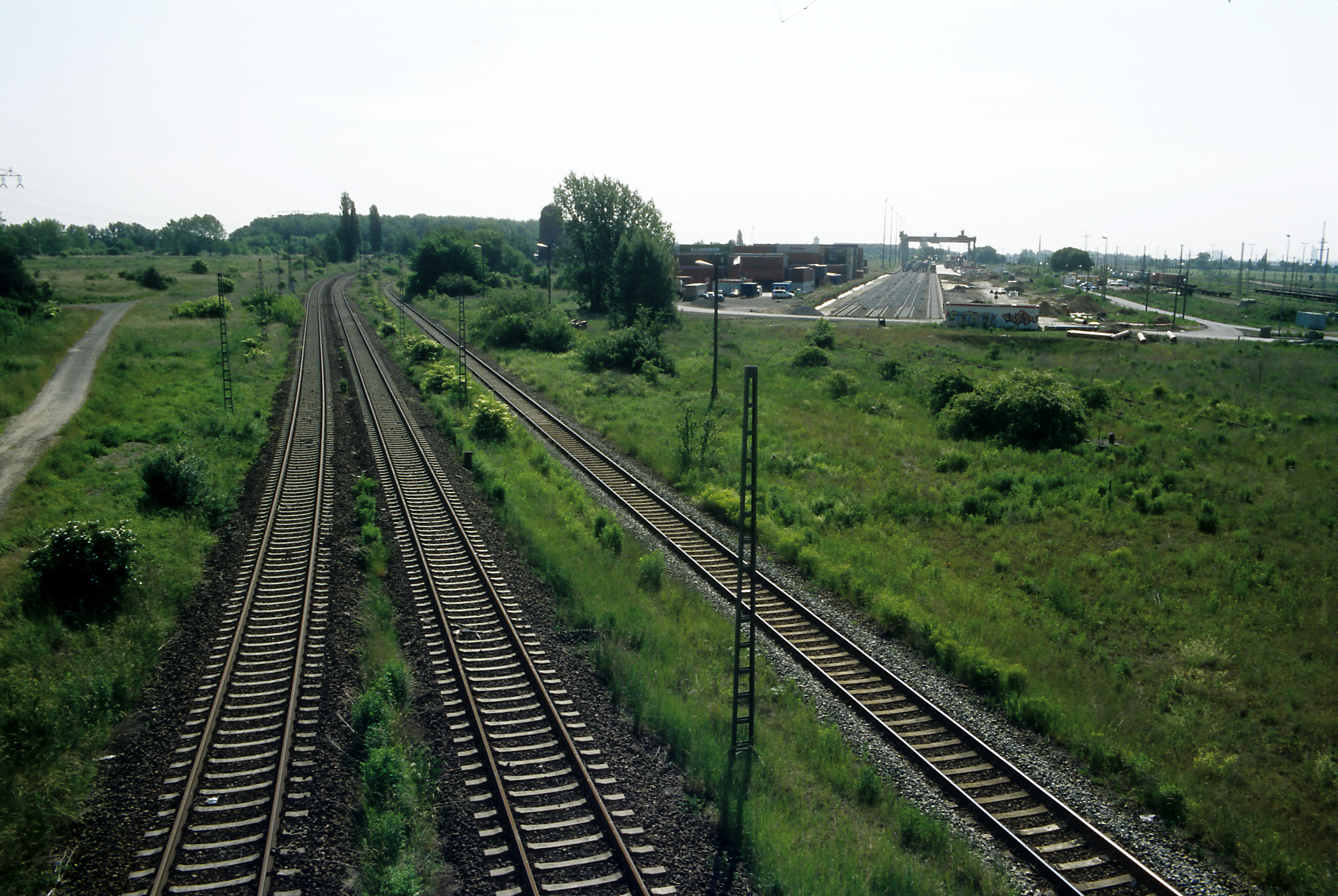
The former passenger tracks on the north side, looking towards Leipzig. On the right is the transshipment facility during the first upgrade, summer 2006

The railway yard in the town of Wahren and the freight ring towards Schönefeld were electrified as early as 1914, but shortly after the beginning of the First World War the operation of electric trains in central Germany was stopped and the catenary systems were dismantled for the production of non-ferrous metals. The overhead wiring systems were rebuilt between 1921 and 1923, but the Leipzig-Wahren–Leipzig Hbf railway was not electrified until 1934. Even during the Second World War, development continued, but none of it was completed. During the course of the war, the station was repeatedly attacked from the air and considerably damage was inflicted. After the end of the war there was a further loss of infrastructure due to dismantling for reparations, including both the main railway tracks and the platform tracks. Electrical operations had to be abandoned again in March 1946. In the 1950s and 1960s, the missing second track lines, which had caused particular difficulties in the heavily used Leipzig node, were replaced, but the line to the Magdeburg-Thüringer freight yard in Leipzig, which was only used by local freight traffic, remained as a single-track line. However, with the re-electrification of the line for the second time in about 1960, masts for two-track operations were installed on this line as well, each carrying two 15 kV supply lines from the Wahren substation to the switching station at Leipzig Hbf.

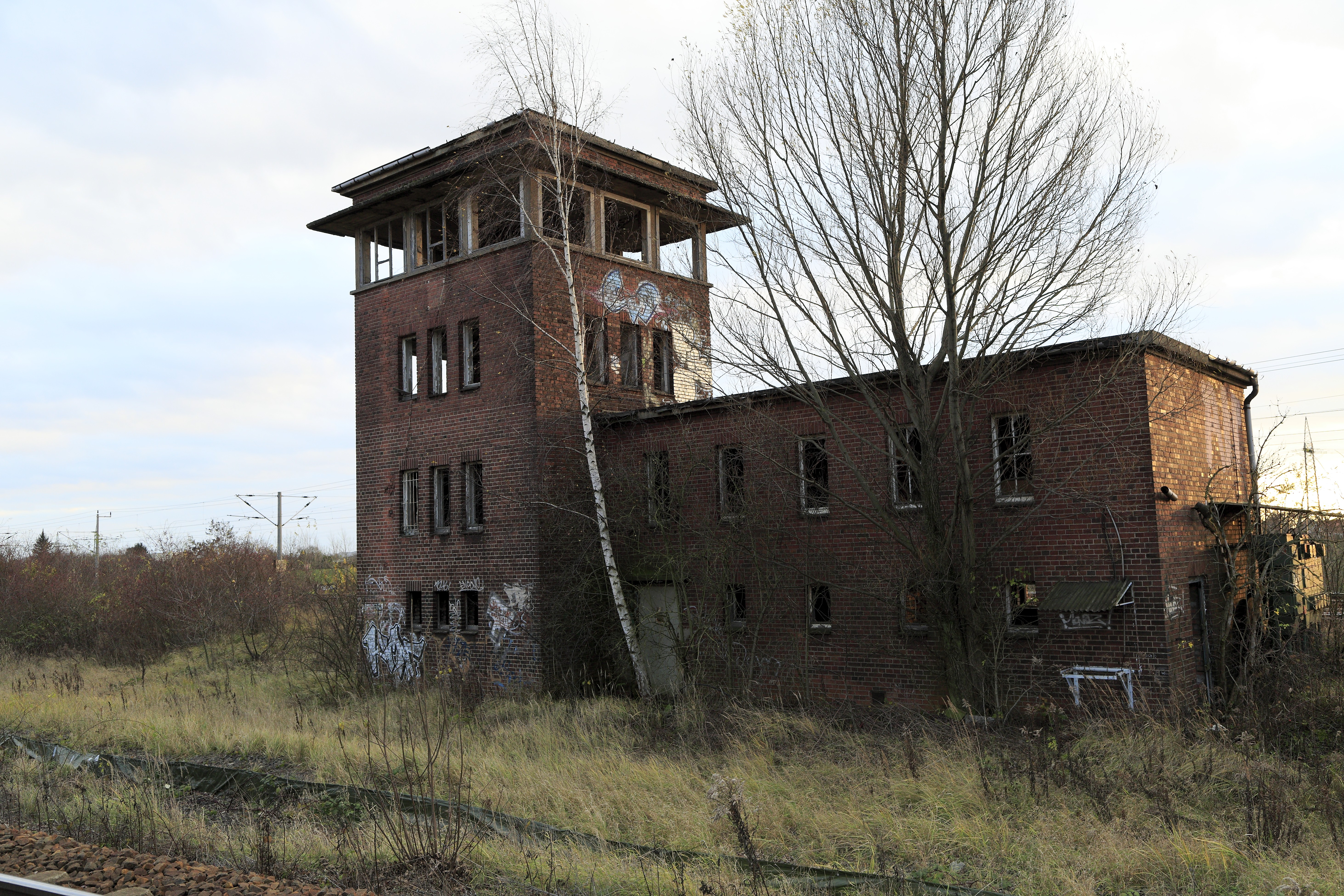
The signal box at the station exit, autumn 2015

Leipzig-Wahren station did not receive a central signal box, only a signal box at its exit with a track-diagram relay interlocking of the GS II DR type. Also, colour-light signals were not installed throughout the station and were essentially only used as entry signals and on the passenger tracks. Electrodynamic track brakes were installed on the marshalling-yard hump.

In the middle of the 1970s, a workshop for the training of electric signal mechanics was set up in the rooms of the former station restaurant in the entrance building by the vocational school of the Reichsbahndirektion (Railway division) of Halle. Its use ended after 1990 with the end of vocational training.

The dismantling of the rail facilities after the end of the operations and the transfer of the passenger operations to the new main thorough tracks on the south side of the station was only implemented slowly. Parts of the track layout and some buildings still remain.

An electronic interlocking built by Thales was installed with the construction of the S-Bahn link between Halle and Leipzig in 2003 and 2004. It is remotely controlled from the Leipzig operating centre in normal operations.

At the end of 2014, the RTL reality-television contestant Melanie Müller, together with her husband and manager, Mike Blümer, bought the now empty entrance building. The former station restaurant was used as a training workshop by Deutsche Reichsbahn in the 1970s and 1990s. The building is to be used both as a residence and as a pension.

== Intermodal yard ==
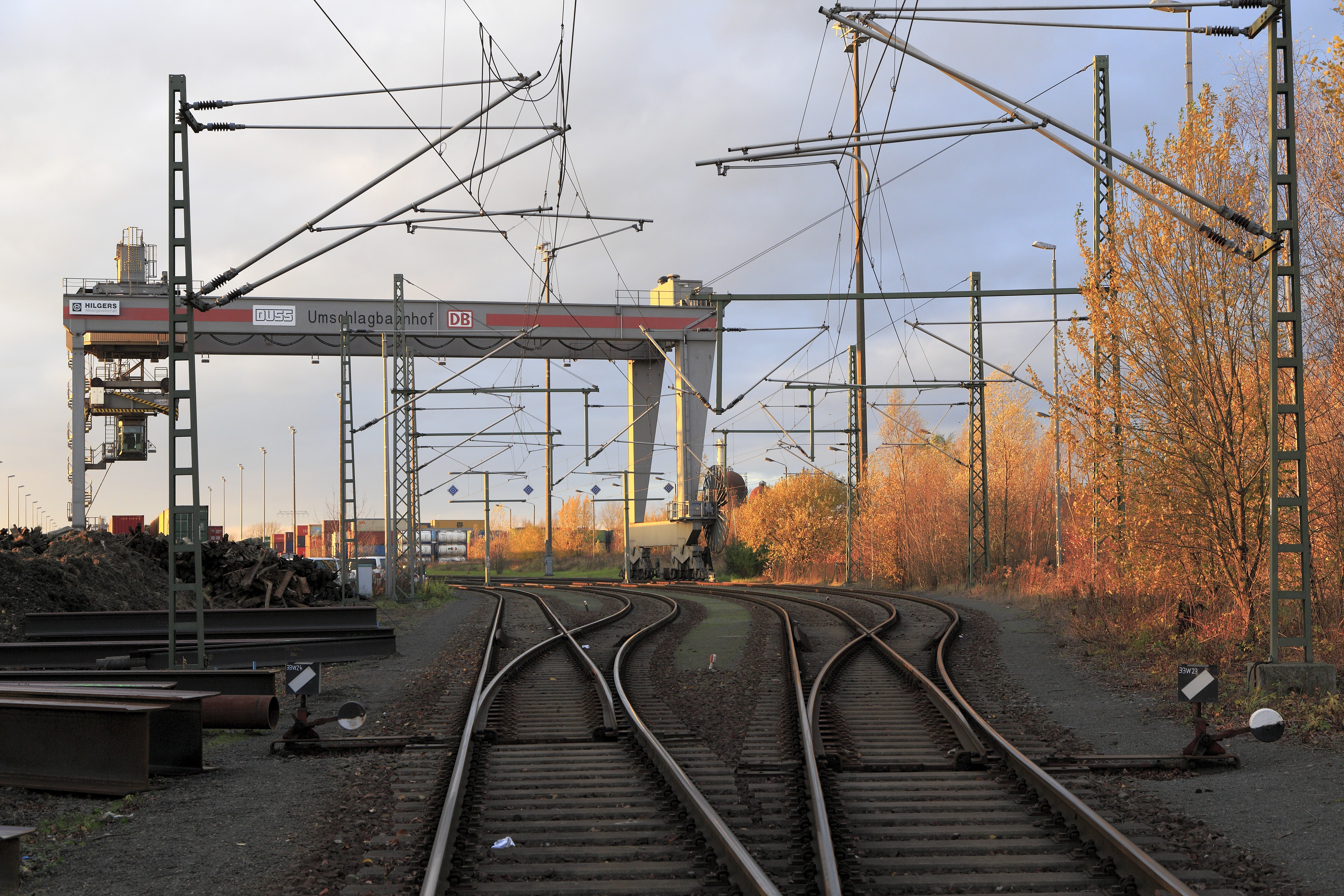
Intermodal yard (December 2015)

Deutsche Bahn's subsidiary Deutsche Umschlaggesellschaft Schiene-Straße (German rail-road intermodal company) opened a container terminal on the premises of the Wahren freight yard after a three-year period of construction on 2 July 2001. This is directly adjacent to a freight distribution centre. Able to handle up to 500 TEUs, it replaced the existing yards in Leipzig-Stötteritz and Halle (Saale). This was extended at the end of 2005 for unit trains and now includes a crane with four 700 m-long tracks. 100,000 TEU can be transshipped each year.

Since the terminal is operating at its capacity limit, a second module with four tracks, two cranes and a transfer building will be erected during a further stage of development. This will double the turnover capacity to 200,000 TEU. Due to construction defects, the opening, which had been planned in the spring of 2017, has been delayed.

Since September 2011, the Trans-Eurasia-Express container train has run daily from the yard to Shenyang in China.

== Passenger services ==
In the station area were the halts (Haltepunkte) of Leipzig-Wahren and Lützschena, which were served by the trains between Leipzig and Halle. They were on the north side of the railway tracks, along the line to Wiederitzsch, which was used by all the local traffic. While most passenger trains stopped in Leipzig-Wahren, Lützschena increasing lost significance due to its poor location and use (tram line 29, later 11, ran through the centre of Lützschena, and ran much more frequently and, until the introduction of the MDV fares, the railway cost much more). The station was closed in 1996, when it was served by only a few trains.

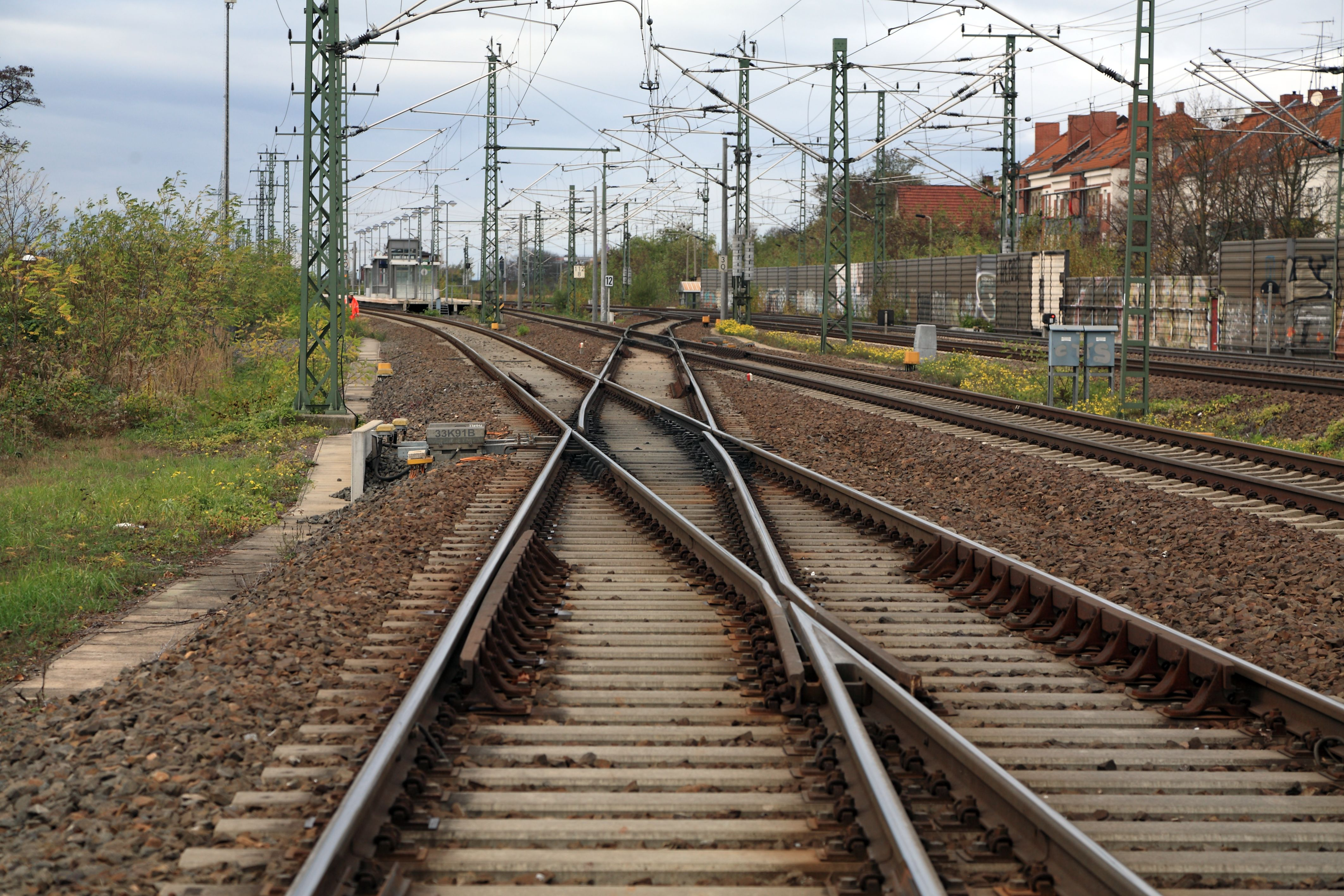
Leipzig-Wahren station from the east

In 2004, the S-Bahn networks in Leipzig and Halle were connected to form the S-Bahn Leipzig-Halle. Since then, the S-Bahn line no longer runs through Wiederitzsch, but over the direct line to Leipzig Hauptbahnhof. Leipzig-Wahren received a new 140 m-long and 55 cm-high island platform on the south side of the track field. The halt in Lützschena was also reopened with new outside platforms under the name of Leipzig-Lützschena. Both halts are administered as parts of Leipzig-Wahren station, which also includes the intermodal yard. They are served today by the trains of line S3 ((Geithain –) Borna – Halle Hbf (– Halle-Trotha)) of the S-Bahn Mitteldeutschland and belong to zone 110 of Mitteldeutscher Verkehrsverbund (Central Germany Transport Association, MDV) for ticketing purposes.

In addition to the S-Bahn, the station is served by bus routes 87, 88, 90 and 91/190. Tram lines 10 and 11 run near the station. Line 10 runs from Wahren via central Leipzig to Lößnig and line 11 from Schkeuditz to Markkleeberg-Ost.
