= Leipzig-Engelsdorf marshalling yard =

Goods station in Leipzig, Germany

Leipzig Engelsdorf
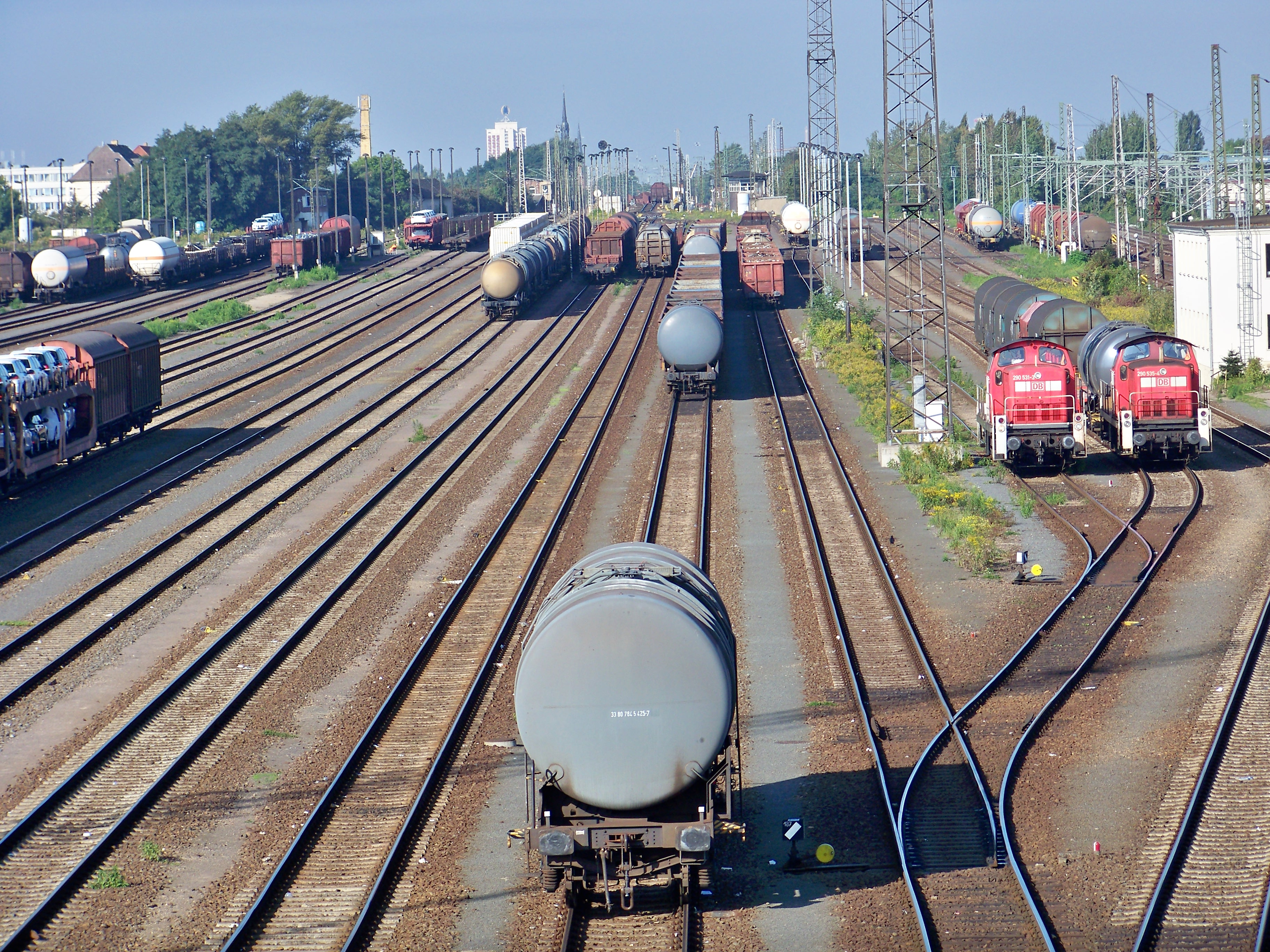
- Marshalling yard tracks towards Westberg

General information
- Location: Hans-Weigel-Str., Engelsdorf, Leipzig, Saxony; Germany
- Coordinates: 51°20′38″N 12°28′11″E
- Lines: Leipzig–Dresden (km 6.432); Engelsdorf–Connewitz (km 1.581); Wahren–Engelsdorf (km 16.732)
- Platforms: 2

Construction
- Accessible: Yes

Other information
- Station code: 8018
- DS100 code: LE
- IBNR: 8012197
- Category: 5
- Fare zone: MDV: 110
- Website: www.bahnhof.de

History
- Opened: 1906
Location

Leipzig-Engelsdorf marshalling yard (Bahnhof Leipzig-Engelsdorf) is the central marshalling yard in the Leipzig rail node in the German state of Saxony. Until it was closed in 1994, there was also a marshalling yard at Leipzig-Wahren station. It is located on the Leipzig–Dresden, Engelsdorf–Leipzig-Connewitz and Leipzig-Wahren–Engelsdorf railways in the Leipzig suburb of Engelsdorf. The halts of Leipzig Werkstättenstraße (on the Leipzig–Geithain railway) and Leipzig-Engelsdorf Hp (Haltepunkte, on the Leipzig–Dresden railway) are located in the marshalling yard area. It was called Bahnhof Engelsdorf (b Leipzig) until December 2016.

== Marshalling yard ==
The marshalling yard was opened with 26 sorting tracks on 1 July 1906. This was increased to 31 tracks after the extension of the subordinate group at signal box D. The entry group at the western end of the marshalling yard is located on the Leipzig Freight Ring with double-track connections to the south and the north. For trains arriving from Dresden, which terminate at the eastern hump (Ostberg), there is a haulage track to connect with the entry group of the western hump (Westberg).

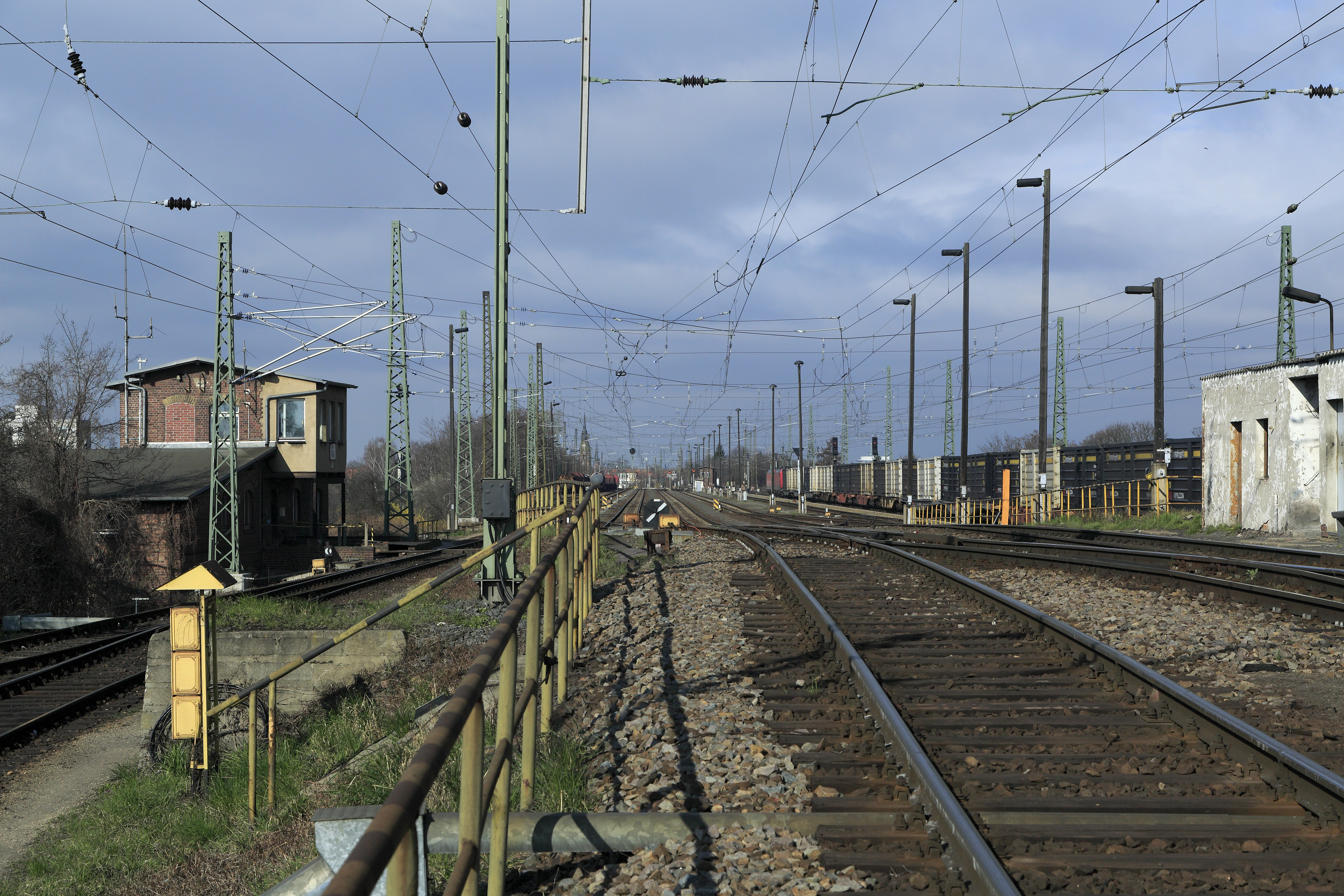
Western hump entry group from the top of the ramp, left signal box 2

14 mechanical signal boxes were built for the operation of the freight yard, mainly of the Bruchsal G design. Over the years, signal boxes B and D were abolished during the replacement of sets of points and in 1974 signal boxes 5, 7, 8 (old), 10 and 11 were replaced during the commissioning of the new central signal box B8. Signal box 4 was destroyed in an air raid during the Second World War and reconstructed in 1947 in a different style with yellow clinker brickwork and a lever frame of the Jüdel design from old spare parts. In the 1960s, an electro-mechanical lever frame of a 1907 design was installed in the previously mechanical signal box A and, in addition, the approach track received three beam retarders. In 1971, colour light signals were installed on the western hump. These are operated centrally by the dispatcher at the western hump, who was moved from signal box 2 to exit signal box 1 at the same time. During the construction of the Engelsdorf crossing structure, which took the Leipzig–Geithain railway under the exit from the yard, exit signal boxes A and 3 were remodelled. Both were equipped with electro-mechanical lever frames of 1912 design with lamp monitoring and signal box A was relocated from its old position on the crossing structure to the already prepared Bremsturm (brake signal box). In 1988, the sorting tracks were equipped with screw-type track brakes so that since then no riders have been required to retard wagons.

A direct approach from Leipzig Hauptbahnhof has not been possible since the upgrade of the line to Dresden. It is possible for trains to run towards Dresden from the middle and the eastern end of the marshalling yard. In addition, a third track runs directly from the freight yard parallel to the line to Dresden as far as Borsdorf. As a result of upgrade of the Leipzig–Dresden railway, mainline tracks 1 and 2 and the third track to Borsdorf are no longer controlled by central signal box 8, but are instead controlled by the electronic control centre in Wurzen.

In 2003, after the cessation of freight traffic, the entry and exit on the line to Geithain were also closed. At the same time, signal box 4, which controlled these routes, was closed and control of the remaining set of points at the transition to single-track operations towards Liebertwolkwitz was taken over by Leipzig Ost (east) electronic signalling centre. The task of controlling connecting lines 17 and 108, which had previously been in the signalling area that was controlled by signal box 4, was no longer controlled from Engelsdorf station. In 2012, the previously mechanical part of signal box 1 was replaced by track display technology of the GS II DR class, using Siemens axle counters, in preparation for S-Bahn operations on the former Leipzig-Engelsdorf–Leipzig-Connewitz railway. Since then bi-directional operations have been possible between Stötteritz and Engelsdorf, as well as on railway tracks 10 and 11 between the western and eastern humps, which are equipped with automatic block signaling.

After the reconstruction of the Halle (Saale) freight yard, operations will end at the yard.

== Passenger halts in the marshalling yard area ==
Leipzig-Engelsdorf Hp

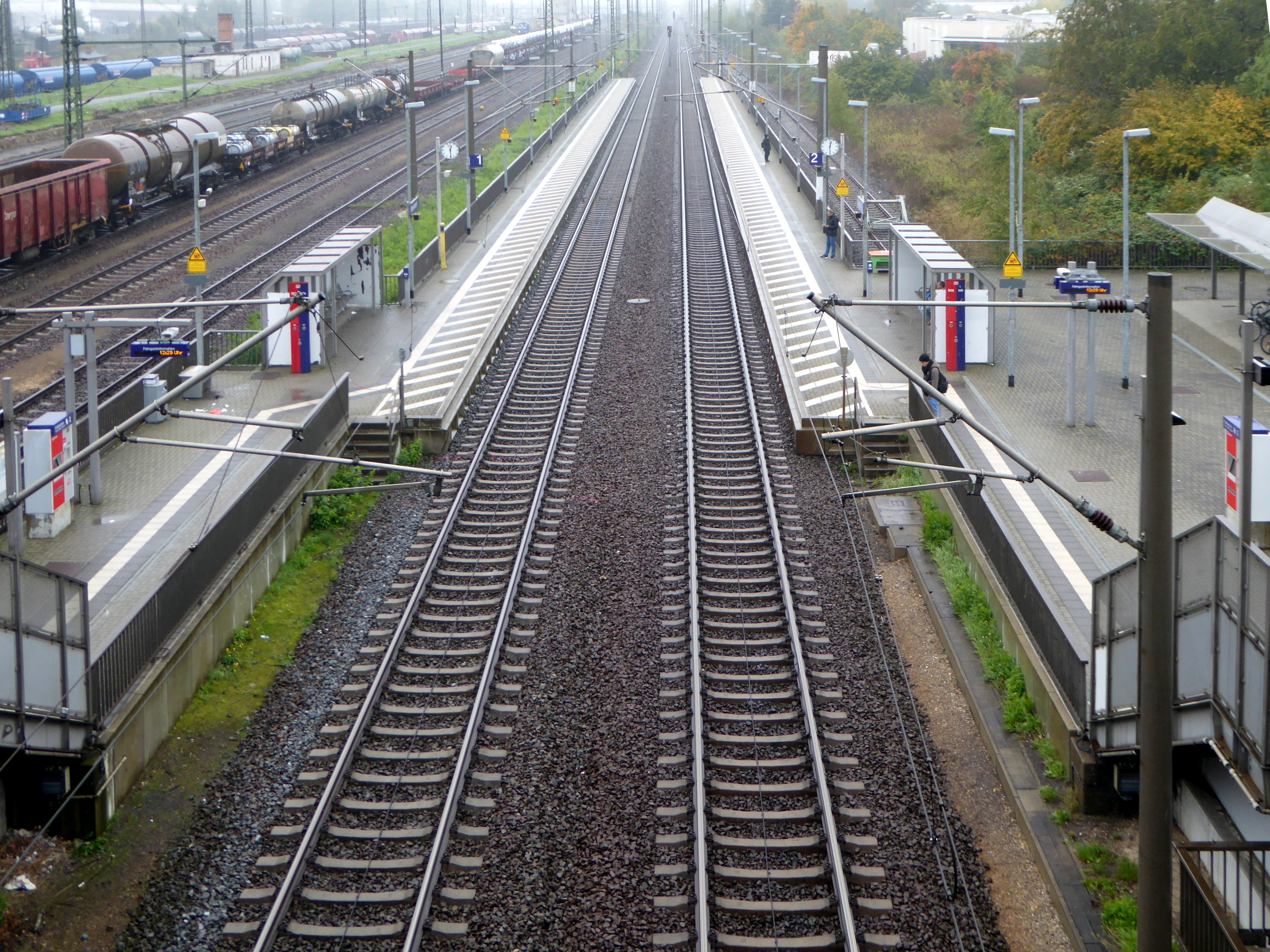
Leipzig-Engelsdorf Hp (2015)

The halt (Haltepunkt) of Leipzig-Engelsdorf Hp was opened for passengers on the Leipzig–Dresden line on 4 April 2001. It is located on Hans-Weigel-Straße. The halt is served by line S3 services of the S-Bahn Mitteldeutschland, Leipzig–Dresden Regional-Express services and Regionalbahn services towards Grimma and Döbeln.

Engelsdorf Ost

The halt of Engelsdorf Ost was opened on 1 November 1877 as Sommerfeld. It was located on Engelsdorfer Strasse and was replaced on 4 April 2001 by the new halt of Engelsdorf Hp (now Leipzig-Engelsdorf Hp).

Leipzig-Industriegelände Ost

The halt of Leipzig-Industriegelände Ost on Güterbahnhofstraße was located on the Leipzig–Dresden railway under the footbridge over the freight yard from 26 May 1974 until 8 April 2001. It was used in particular by commuters on the Engelsdorf line, which was strong until the beginning of the 1990s. It was closed without being replaced. The pedestrian bridge, which was renewed in the 1980s, still exists.

Leipzig Werkstättenstraße

The halt of Leipzig Werkstättenstraße, located south of the marshalling yard on the Leipzig–Geithain railway, is served by the RB 113 Regionalbahn service. Since the restarting of the route in 2004, services generally only stop on request.

== Leipzig-Engelsdorf locomotive depot ==
A Bahnbetriebswerk (locomotive depot) has been located on the edge of the site for over 100 years. A locomotive and wagon workshop was built in 1904 and 1905 and inaugurated on 1 December 1905. It subsequently became an Ausbesserungswerk (repair shop). Today, the works is owned by the Railmaint company. After being sold by Deutsche Bahn in 2001, it became the main works of the RSM Group of Herr Hermann Weise. It was sold to the Euro Maint company in 2010. It was again sold to the Railmaint Group In 2016.
