= Leipzig-Wahren–Leipzig Hbf railway =

Railway line in Germany

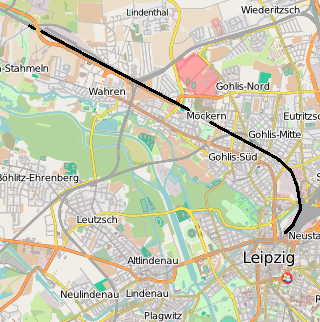

Overview
- Line number: 6382
- Locale: Saxony, Germany

Service
- Route number: 505.10

Technical
- Number of tracks: 2: Leipzig-Wahren–Leipzig Olbrichtstraße and MTh flying junction–Leipzig Hbf (underground)
- Track gauge: 1,435 mm (4 ft 8 1/2 in) standard gauge
- Minimum radius: 220 m (720 ft)
- Electrification: 15 kV/16.7 Hz AC catenary
- Operating speed: 120 km/h (75 mph) (maximum)
- Maximum incline: 0.806%

The Leipzig-Wahren–Leipzig Hbf railway is an electrified main line in the German state of Saxony. It runs from Leipzig-Wahren to Leipzig Hauptbahnhof and is part of the original route of the Magdeburg–Leipzig railway. Today it is used exclusively by services of the S-Bahn Mitteldeutschland.

== History ==
The current Leipzig-Wahren–Leipzig Hbf line was opened on 18 August 1840 as part of the Magdeburg–Leipzig railway built by the Magdeburg-Leipzig Railway Company (Magdeburg-Leipziger Eisenbahn-Gesellschaft). The terminus of the line in Leipzig was the Magdeburger Bahnhof.

The Magdeburg–Leipzig line was rebuilt, starting in 1906, as part of the comprehensive reconstruction of the Leipzig railway network, on a new route parallel to the Leipzig freight ring (Leipziger Güterring) and the old line between Wahren and Leipzig was subsequently used only for freight traffic.

With the construction and commissioning of the new Leipzig Hauptbahnhof on 1 October 1912, the Magdeburger Bahnhof was closed and later demolished.

In 1 April 1920, the Prussian state railways were absorbed by Deutsche Reichsbahn. From then on, the line was administered by the Reichsbahndirektion Halle (railway division of Halle). Although the main line from Halle to Leipzig via Wiederitzsch was operated electrically from 1922, the direct line was not electrified until the middle of the 1930s. The first train was hauled by an electric locomotive on 2 July 1934.

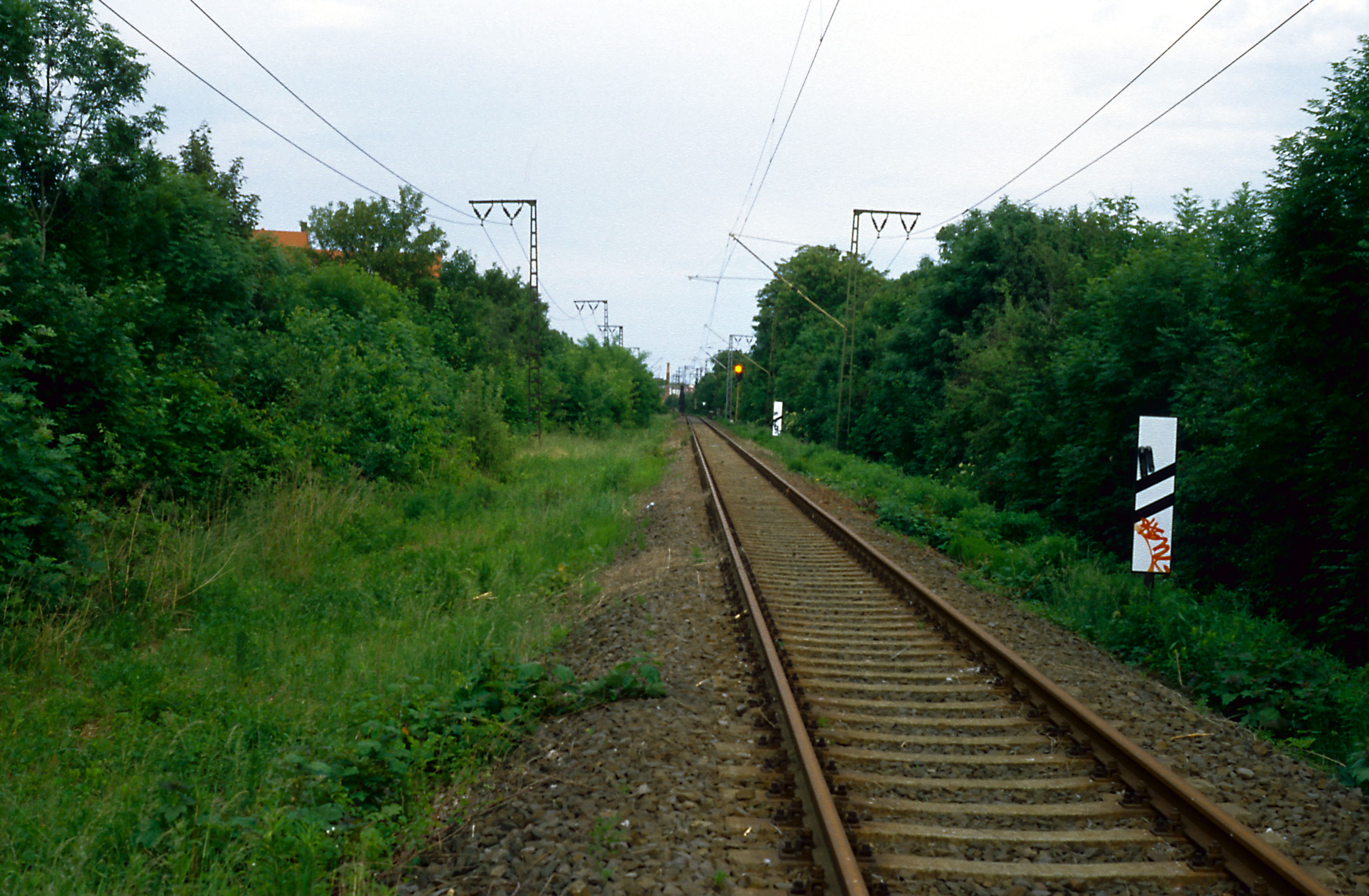
Track towards Leipzig MTh before its conversion for S-Bahn operations

The electrical installations and the second track were dismantled for reparations to the Soviet Union in 1946. The re-electrification of the line was not commissioned until 15 May 1959. The route remained single-track, but the overhead masts were designed for double-track operations. Each sets of masts also carried two 15 kV supply lines from the Wahren substation to the switching station at Leipzig Hbf.

After 2000, the line was extensively modernised as part of the S-Bahnstrecke Leipzig–Halle (Leipzig–Halle S-Bahn line) project. In addition to the establishment of the new Leipzig Slevogtstraße, Leipzig Olbrichtstraße and Leipzig-Gohlis station, the line between Wahren and Wiederitzscher Straße was restored to two tracks. At the same time, Leipzig-Wahren station was converted from a classic marshalling yard to a yard for handling combined transport and it received new main line tracks connecting lines 6403 from Halle and 6382 to Leipzig with platforms in Wahren and Lützschena.

The line was put back into operation on 5 December 2004 and was initially used by the regional trains of the RB 56 service, running as a trial operation with passengers. From 12 December 2004, it was operated with the new sets of the Leipzig-Halle S-Bahn (line S10).

Line S3 of the S-Bahn Mitteldeutschland has served the stations on the line since December 2013.

== Route description ==
=== Route ===
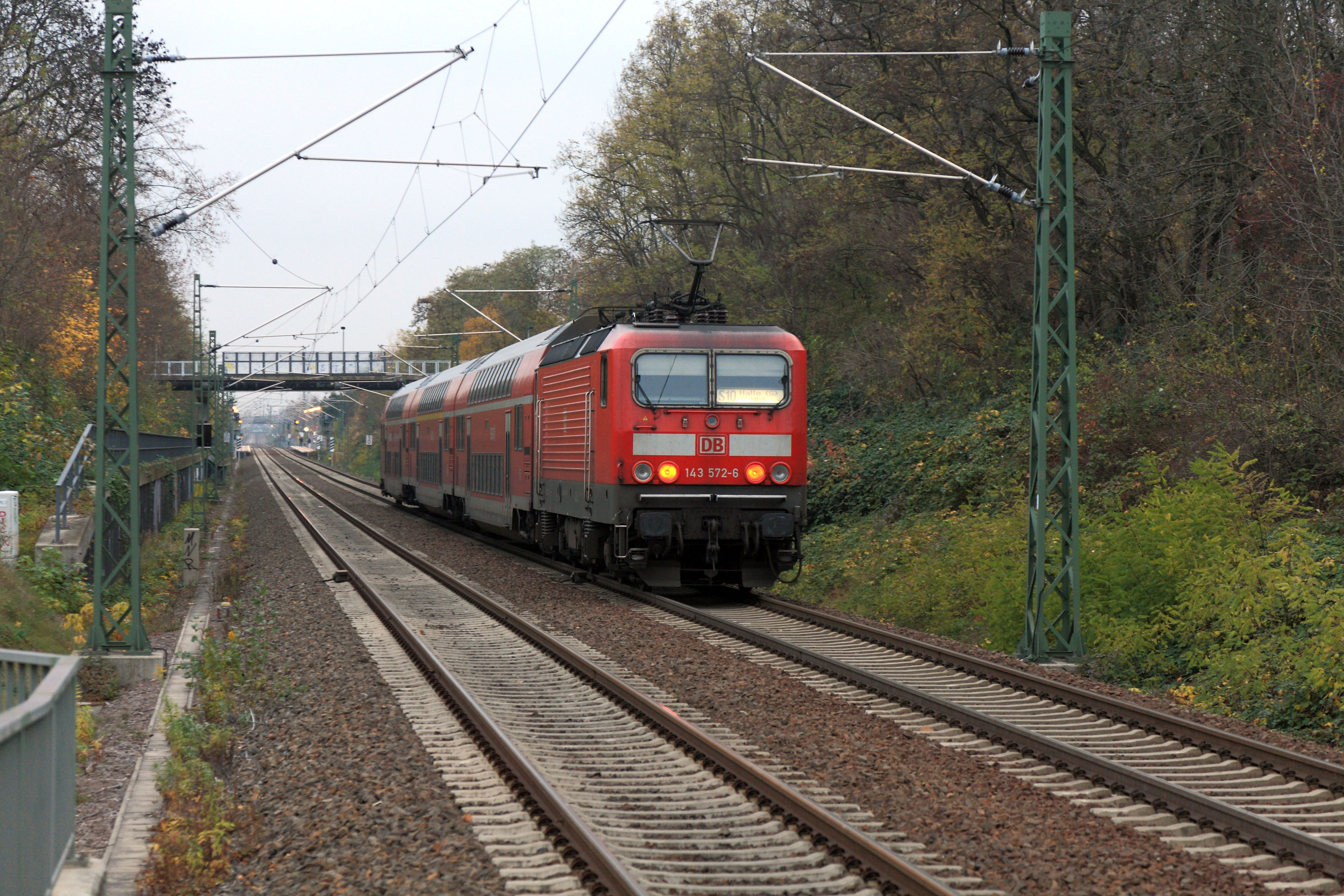
Double track section between Olbrichtstraße and Slevogtstraße

The route runs in a straight line to the southeast as far as Leipzig-Gohlis and passes through the Leipzig suburbs of Lützschena, Stahmeln, Wahren, Möckern and Gohlis. On the route, it passes under federal highway 6 near Lützschena and over the Leipzig freight ring between Wahren and Möckern. In the vicinity of Breitenfelder Straße in the district of Gohlis, it crosses the Leipzig–Großkorbetha railway, which approached from the south-west, before the latter meets the line at the halt of Gohlis and from then on runs parallel with it. After a right turn, the line connects with the Großkorbetha railway to and from Wahren and Leutzsch at the "MTh" (Magdeburg-Thuringian) flying junction, which allows connections towards the City Tunnel and the train shed of the Leipzig Hbf, and runs down the western tunnel ramp into the Leipzig City Tunnel. In the subterranean flying junction, the line passes on to underground track 9396 at the northern entrance to the underground platform.

=== Operating points ===
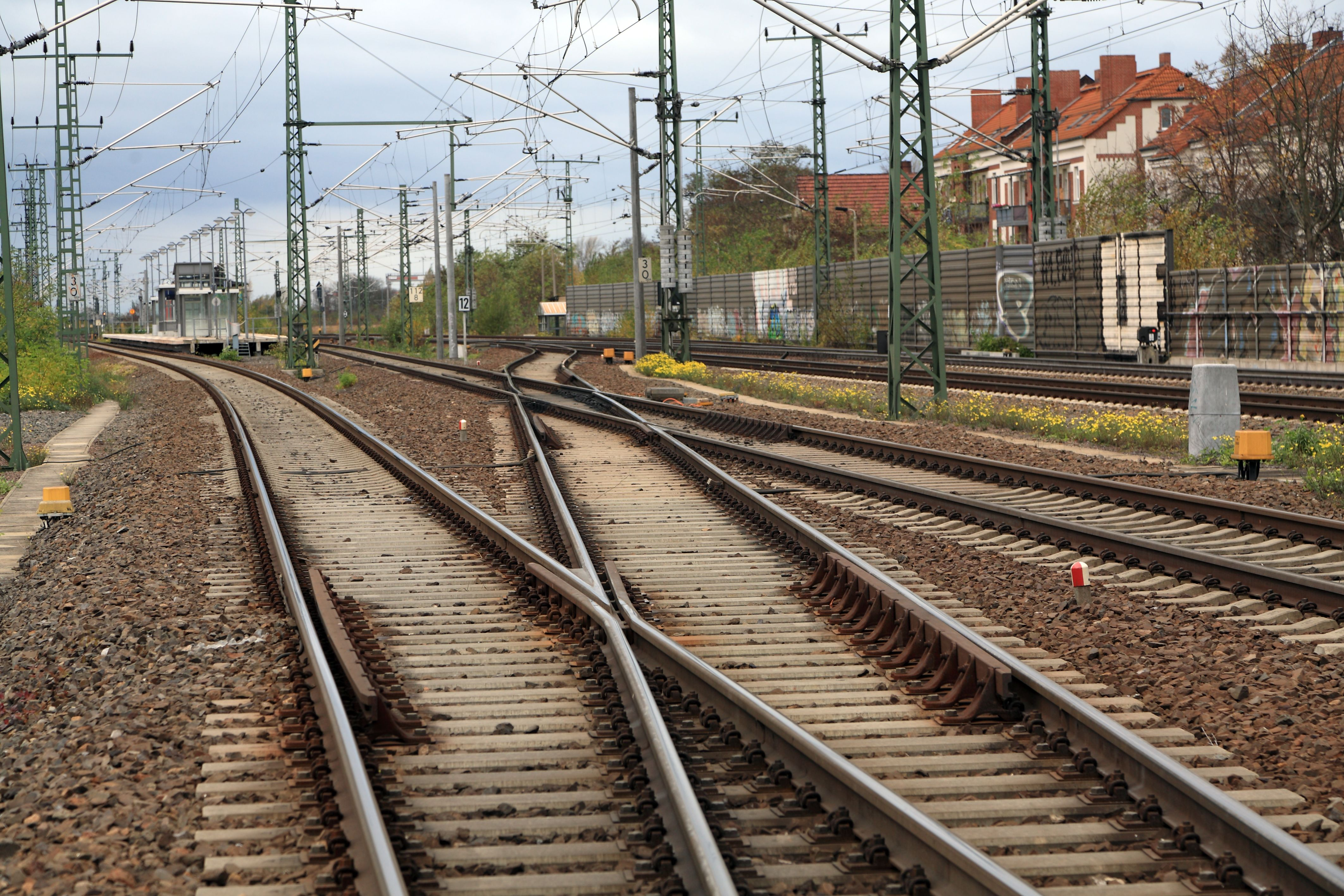
Leipzig-Wahren station from the east

Leipzig-Wahren station

The Leipzig-Wahren freight yard developed as part of the reconstruction of the Leipzig rail yards at the beginning of the twentieth century, in which all facilities, especially the marshalling yards, which were not needed near the centre, were moved to the suburbs. It was commissioned on 9 April 1905.

Leipzig-Gohlis halt

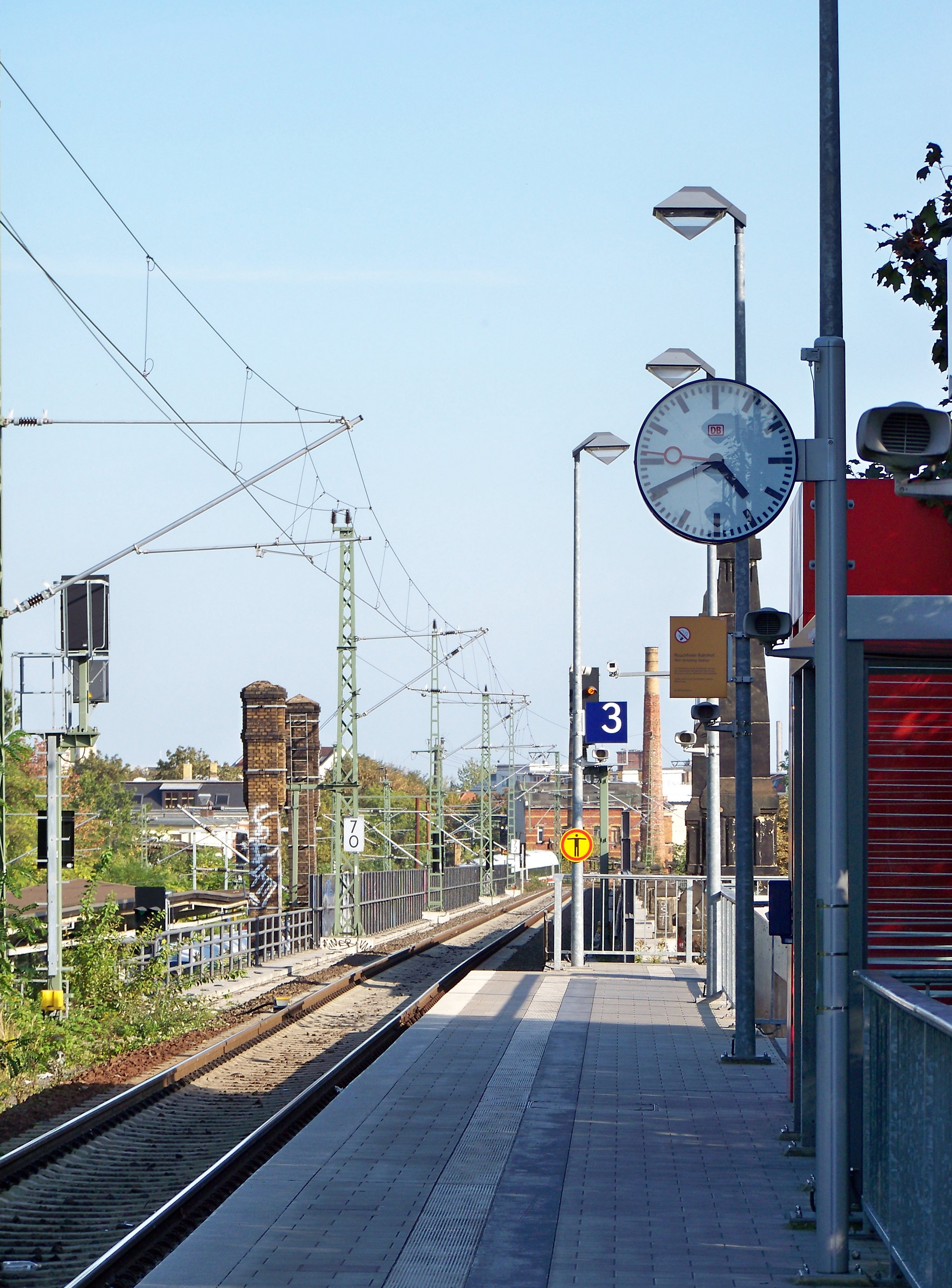
Leipzig-Gohlis halt, 2009

The halt of Leipzig-Gohlis was originally on the Leipzig–Großkorbetha railway, which now runs parallel. The platform on the Leipzig-Wahren–Leipzig Hbf railway was only built during the restoration of the second track during the upgrade for the S-Bahn in 2004. It is accessible via stairs or via a lift from Lützowstraße. There is no direct connection to the platforms on the Leipzig–Großkorbetha railway.
