= Leipzig Freight Ring =

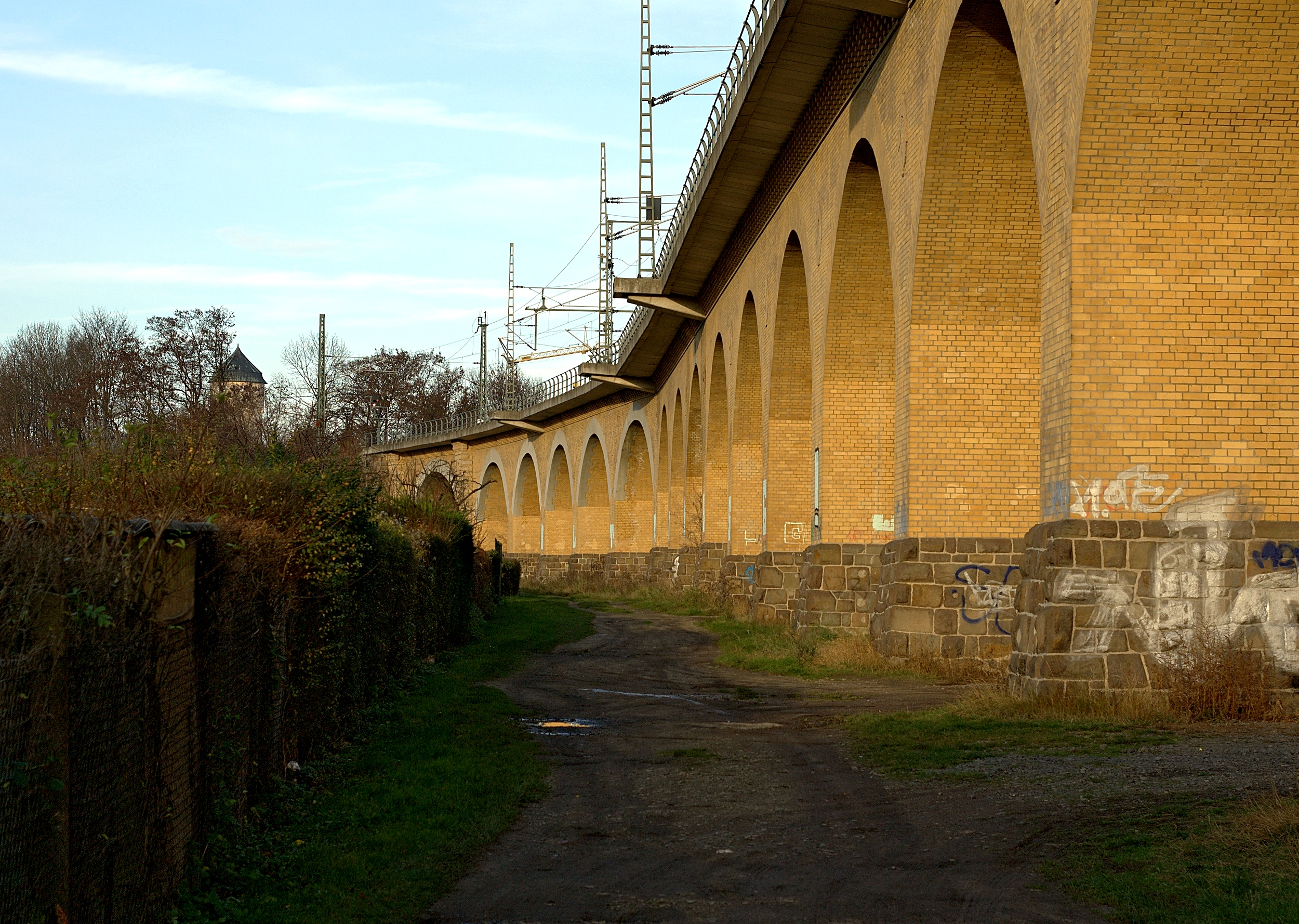
Wahren railway viaduct, which forms part of the Leipzig Freight Ring between Leutzsch and Wahren / Wiederitzsch

The Leipzig Freight Ring (Leipziger Güterring) is a network of railways in Saxony and consists of several individual lines. As a bypass for freight trains in the Leipzig railway node, it links all approach lines and thus enables the separation of passenger and freight operations.

== History ==
The construction of the Leipzig Freight Ring was closely linked to the extensive reconstruction of the Leipzig rail yards in the years preceding the First World War. At that time the associated railway infrastructure of the Royal Saxon State Railways and the Prussian state railways was no longer up to date and was not able to meet demand.

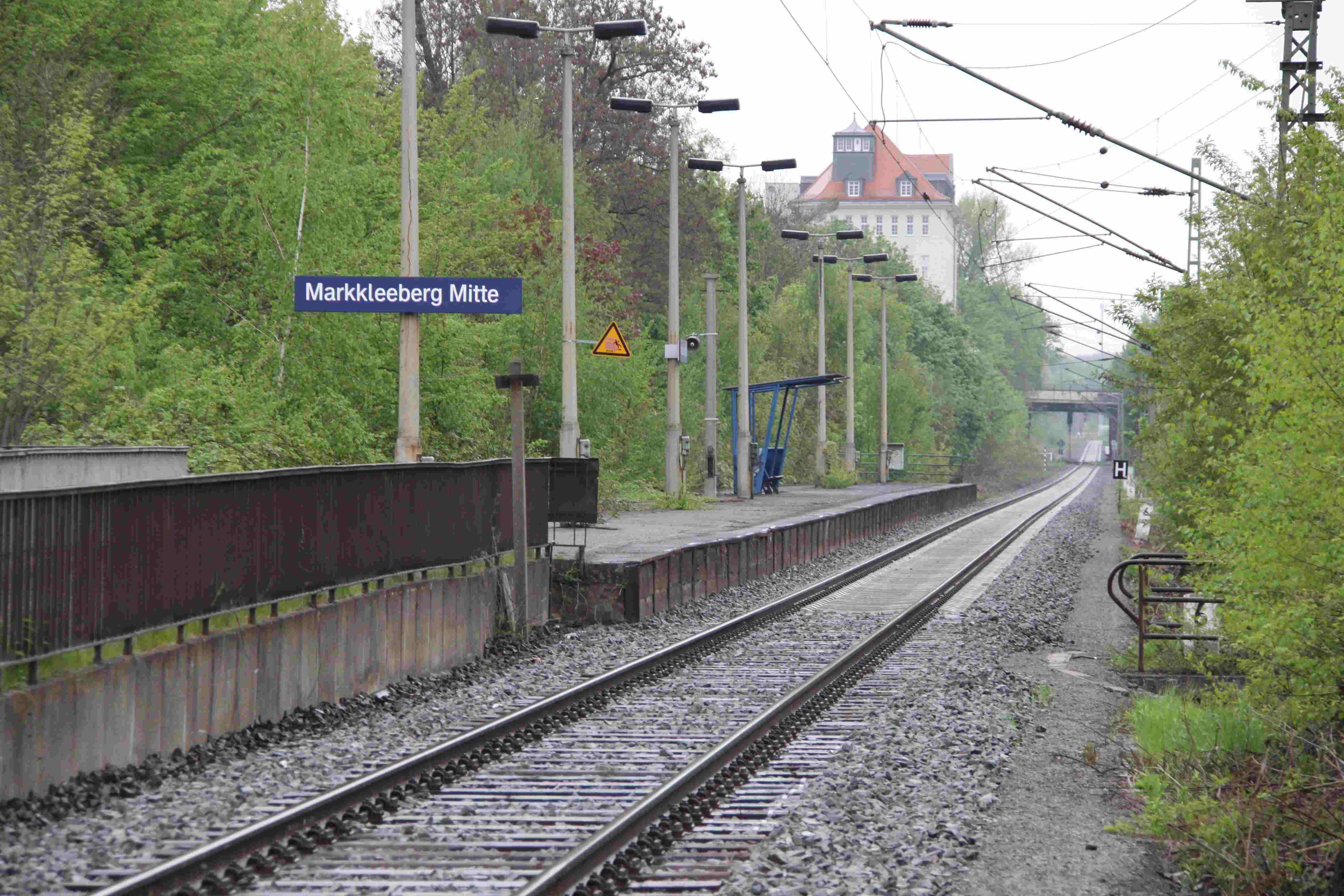
Markkleeberg Mitte S-Bahn station on the Leipzig-Plagwitz–Markkleeberg-Gaschwitz line which was served only by the freight ring (2008)

Most of the line was built by the Prussian state railways to the north and west of the Leipzig urban area. The Royal Saxon State Railways built some connecting lines east of Leipzig, which in particular served to integrate the new Leipzig-Engelsdorf marshalling yard. The Saxon link, previously operated only as a secondary line, the Plagwitz-Lindenau–Gaschwitz railway was upgraded to be a single-track main line.

The line between the Wahren marshalling yard and Leipzig-Schönefeld was wired with an electric catenary in 1914. This was one of the first electrified lines in Germany. Due to the two world wars and the resulting dismantling of the catenary in or after both wars, the complete electrification of the freight ring could not be completed until 1963.

The Leipzig-Plagwitz–Gaschwitz link was developed as line A of the first Leipzig S-Bahn and opened in 1969. With the political and economic changes with the end of Communism, traffic fell at the turn of the 21st century and falling patronage led to the closure of the passenger service in 2002.

The Freight Ring still carries most freight traffic in the Leipzig railway node. Scheduled passenger services no longer operate on it, except during diversions as a result of construction projects. Nevertheless, on all lines there are authorised routes; the eastern part of the Freight Ring is, for example, used occasionally for diverted long-distance traffic between Berlin and Dresden. They were used regularly in the past for special services from the Leipzig Trade Fair to the Bayerischen Bahnhof. With the commissioning of the City Tunnel on 15 December 2013, the section between Stötteritz and Paunsdorf was integrated in the network of the S-Bahn Mitteldeutschland.

== Lines ==
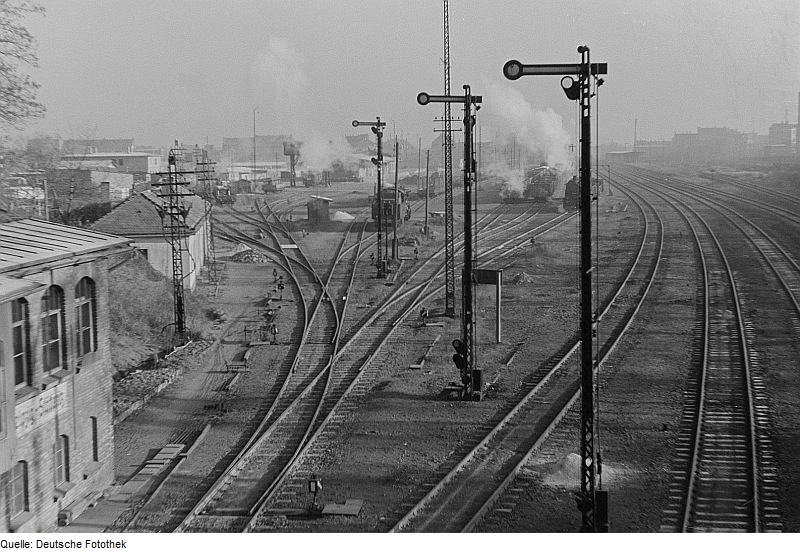
Stötteritz freight yard (1952)

Built by Prussian State Railways:

- Leipzig-Leutzsch–Leipzig-Wahren (initiated 9 April 1905)
- Leipzig-Wahren–Leipzig-Schönefeld (1 May 1906)

Built by Royal Saxon State Railways:

- Leipzig-Plagwitz–Markkleeberg-Gaschwitz (1 September 1879 as a secondary railway; upgraded to main-line standard in 1907)
- Leipzig-Schönefeld–Leipzig-Engelsdorf (1 May 1906)
- Leipzig-Engelsdorf–Leipzig-Stötteritz (1 May 1906)
