= Leipzig Hbf–Leipzig-Connewitz railway =

Railway line in Saxony, Germany

Leipzig Hbf–Leipzig-Connewitz
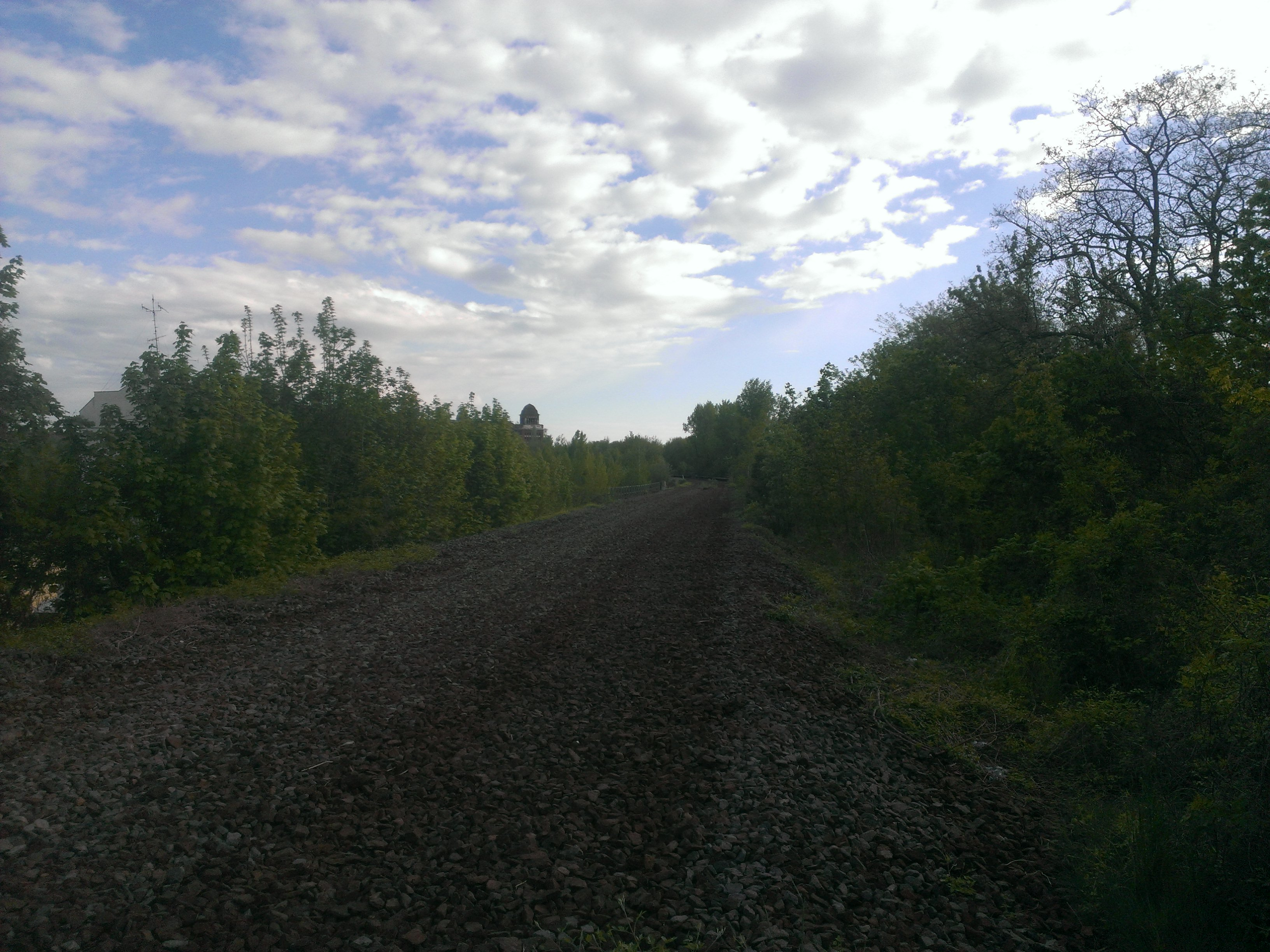

Overview
- Line number: 6361
- Locale: Saxony, Germany

Service
- Route number: 501.2, 527

Technical
- Line length: 9.36 km (5.82 mi)
- Number of tracks: 2: Leipzig Hbf–Leipzig-Connewitz
- Track gauge: 1,435 mm (4 ft 8 1/2 in) standard gauge
- Minimum radius: 380 m (1,247 ft)
- Electrification: 15 kV/16.7 Hz AC overhead catenary
- Maximum incline: 1.06%

The Leipzig Hauptbahnhof–Leipzig-Connewitz railway is a double track electrified main line in the German state of Saxony. It used to be a short link line from Leipzig Hauptbahnhof (Central Station) to Connewitz station, where it connects with the main line from Leipzig to Hof. The line was closed for good between Leipzig Hbf and Leipzig-Stötteritz in November 2012.

== History ==
As a successful private company the Leipzig–Dresden Railway Company (German: Leipzig-Dresdner Eisenbahn-Compagnie) was mainly interested in developing its network rather than linking with other railways. After its nationalisation on 1 July 1876, connection of its lines with the existing national railway network became a priority. As a result, the link from Leipzig Hauptbahnhof to the Royal Saxon State Railways line at Connewitz was opened on 20 August 1878.

In the early 1960s the line was one of the first lines electrified in East Germany as part of the Saxon triangle project. On 15 January 1962 the first electric trains ran on the line.

With the establishment of the Leipzig-Halle S-Bahn in 1968-1970, new stations were opened at Sellerhausen, Anger-Crottendorf and Messegelände (now: Völkerschlachtdenkmal). In addition, Marienbrunn was reopened.

With the opening of the Leipzig City Tunnel in December 2013, the line was closed between Leipzig Hbf and Stötteritz. The main reason for this is the avoidance of the costs of the otherwise necessary reconstruction of dilapidated bridges in Stötteritz and Sellerhausen. Due to necessary construction works before opening the tunnel and to connect it to the existing railway network the line has already been closed for good between Leipzig Hbf and Leipzig-Stötteritz on November 24, 2012. Since then the line was also out of service between Leipzig-Stötteritz and Leipzig-Connewitz, but was reopened in this part together with the City Tunnel in December 2013. All passenger traffic on the line between Gaschwitz, Leipzig-Connewitz and Leipzig Hauptbahnhof travels via the City Tunnel. Therefore, the former station at Leipzig-Marienbrunn was not reopened, the section between Tabakmühle junction and Leipzig-Connewitz remains for freight traffic only.
