= Petersstrasse =

Street in Leipzig, Germany

Coordinates: 51.338391°N 12.374639°E

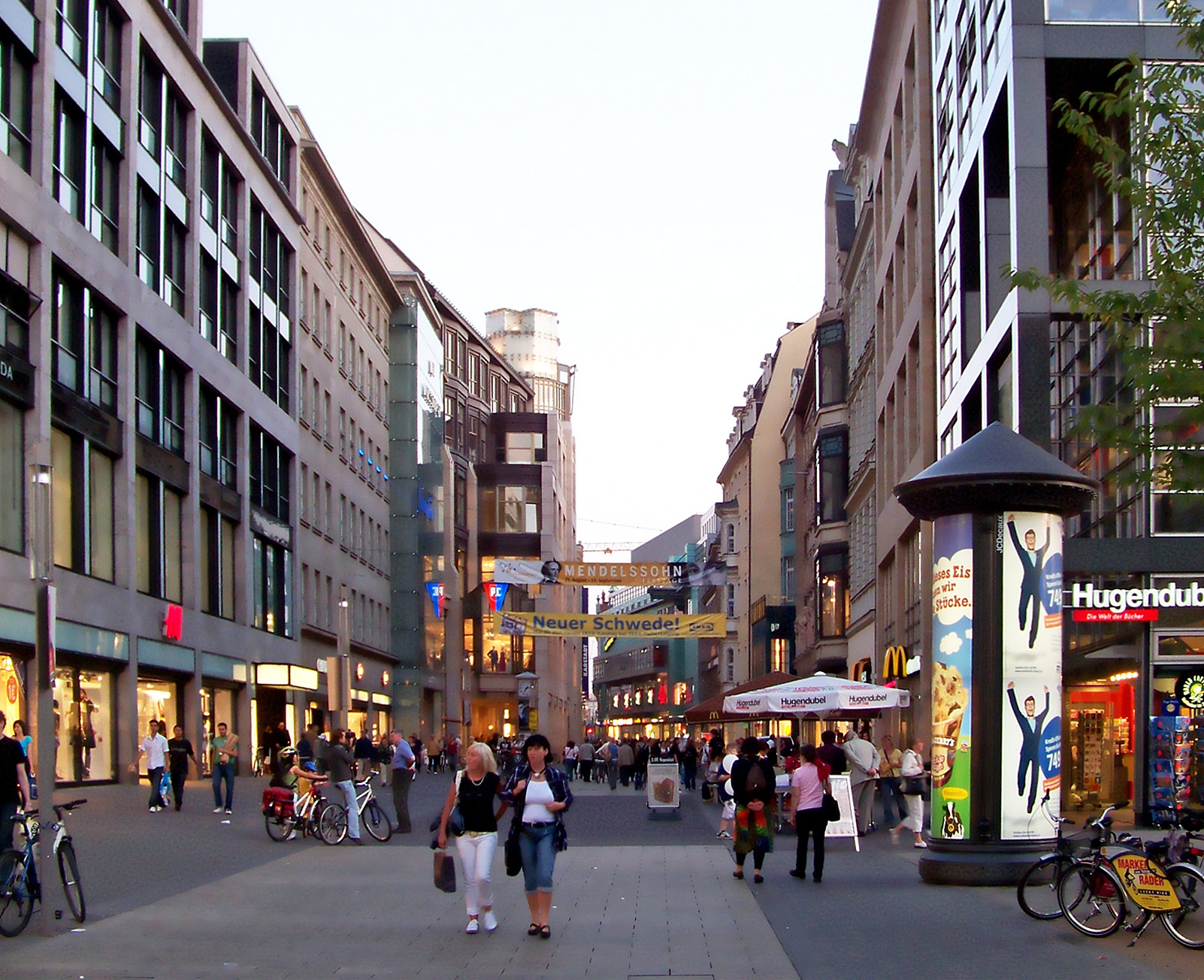
- View of Petersstrasse in 2009
- Interactive map of Petersstrasse
- Length: 347 m (1,138 ft)
- Width: between 11 m (36.1 ft) and 19 m (62.3 ft)
- Location: Leipzig-Mitte, Leipzig, Germany
- Postal code: 04109
- Nearest metro station: Leipzig Markt station and Leipzig Wilhelm-Leuschner-Platz station of S-Bahn Mitteldeutschland
- North end: Markt
- South end: Schillerstrasse

Construction
- Completed: created before the city was founded in 1165, newly designed 2014

Petersstrasse is one of the oldest streets in Leipzig's district of Mitte (neighborhood Zentrum). For centuries it was a main and commercial street for the Leipzig trade fair with exhibition houses, inns and shops. In the second half of the 19th century, many of the old buildings on the street fell victim to the modernization of the city center. Today it is a heavily frequented pedestrian zone in a prime location with shopping centers, department stores, shops, restaurants and cinemas.

== Location and history ==
Petersstrasse is 347 m (1,138.5 ft) long and connects Leipzig's market square in a north–south direction with Wilhelm-Leuschner-Platz. At its southern end were until 1860 the Peter's Gate (Peterstor) and until 1886 the eponymous Peterskirche (old church St. Peter). To the south, at the former gate St. Peter, it continues beyond the Inner City Ring Road as Peterssteinweg. It was part of the Via Imperii and the central street of the surrounding Petersviertel (quarter St. Peter).

There were numerous courtyards on Petersstrasse, some of which had passageways into the neighboring streets (on the western side of Petersstrasse to Thomaskirchhof or Burgstrasse, on the eastern side of Petersstrasse to Neumarkt, which was called Neuer Neumarkt until 1839).

Since the middle of the 19th century, the street has been characterized by a large number of trading houses and trade fair exhibition palaces. Petersstrasse was particularly busy during trade fairs in the 19th and 20th centuries.

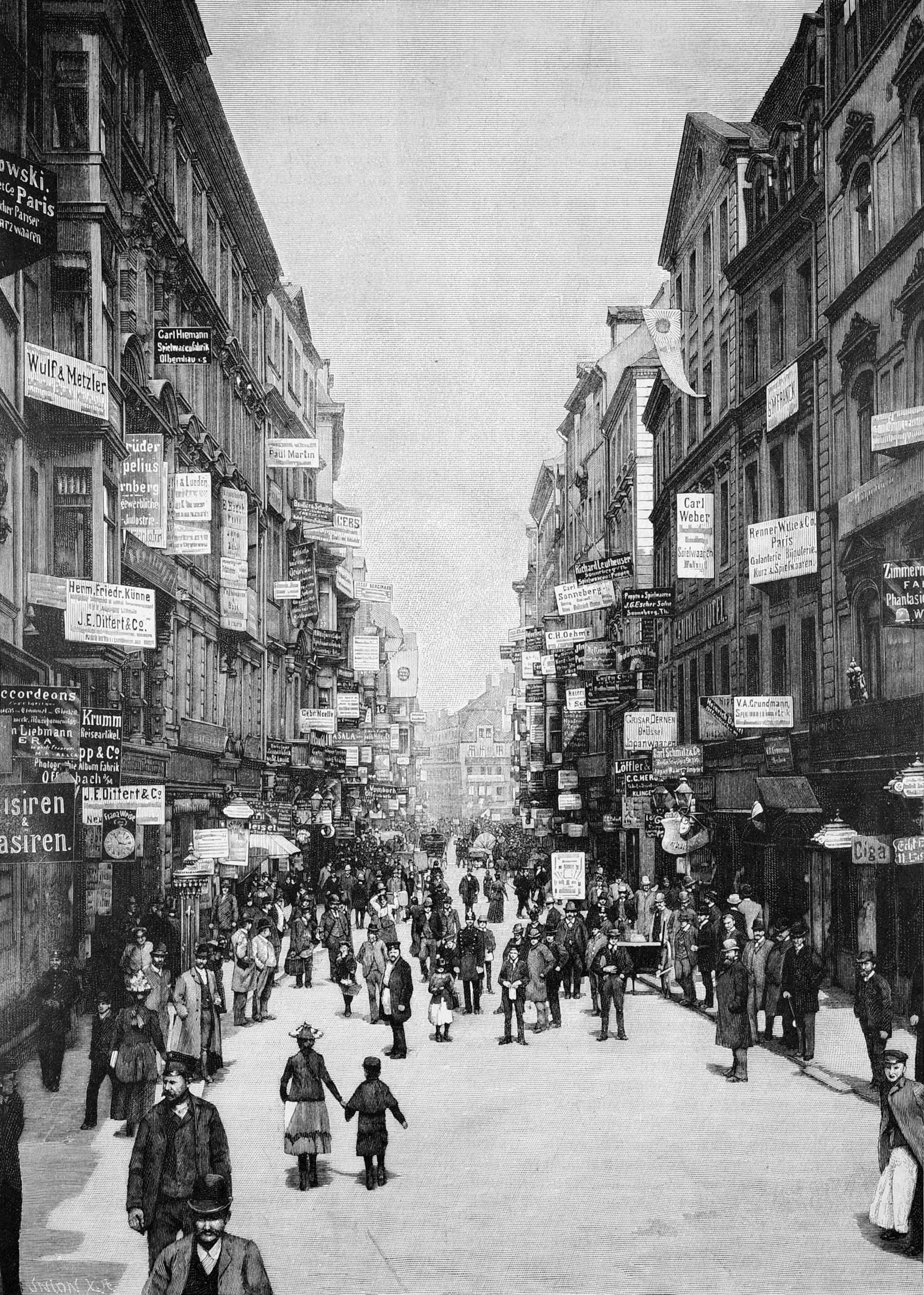
Petersstrasse during the Leipzig Trade Fair in the 1890s

The street space experienced a change in scale. Narrow alley structures made the delivery situation for the exhibition palaces too difficult. After the Second World War, Petersstrasse was initially widened in its northern part from 11 m (36.1 ft) to 19 m (62.3 ft).

Today, the entire length of Petersstrasse is designated as a pedestrian zone and is primarily a shopping and business street. With the construction of the house used by Peek and Cloppenburg, the road widening at this point was reversed. In 2019 the Karstadt department store was closed. A new opening as a shopping, office and restaurant building is announced for the end of 2023.

Small crossing streets are Sporergässchen, Preußergässchen, Peterskirchhof and Schlossgasse.

In 2007 and 2008, two tunnel tubes of the Leipzig City Tunnel of the railway were drilled under Petersstrasse. The City Tunnel was opened in 2013 and opens up Petersstraße from the north through the Leipzig Markt station and from the south through the Leipzig Wilhelm-Leuschner-Platz station.

In 2017, the first public drinking fountain was put into operation by the Leipziger Wasserwerke (Leipzig waterworks) in Petersstrasse, which has since been followed by others in Leipzig.

Petersstrasse is part of the annual Leipzig Christmas Market.

== Development on the east side ==
Odd house numbers starting from the market

=== Petersstrasse 1 to 13, Messehaus am Markt ===
The corner of Petersstrasse and Markt has been the location of various coffee houses since the end of the 17th century. There has been an exhibition center here since 1913, and the Messehaus am Markt since 1963, where the Leipzig Book Fair took place from 1993 until the move to the new exhibition center. The building was converted into a commercial building in 2004/2005 according to plans by the architects Weis & Volkmann, which has a connection to the arcade system in the south.

=== Petersstrasse 15, Messehof ===
The most important previous building on the site was the baroque city palace Hohmanns Hof, which was destroyed by the Bombing of Leipzig in World War II, before the Messehof was built here between 1949 and 1950 as the first new municipal exhibition center building after the war. Today it is a commercial building with a shopping arcade, the Messehofpassage, with a connection to the Mädler Arcade Gallery (in German: Mädlerpassage).

=== Petersstrasse 17 / 23, Peek & Cloppenburg ===
This is where the Haus zur Flora was located, which burned down completely in the devastating bomber attack on Leipzig on 4 December 1943, without being hit by bombs. In 1991, Peek & Cloppenburg acquired the area that had previously been used for fruit and vegetable markets and opened a five-story clothing store in 1994. The design comes from the architect Charles Moore and his partners.

=== Petersstrasse 25 / 31, Karstadt department store (until 2019) ===
The store, which was run as Karstadt Leipzig from 1990 to 2019, was opened in 1914 as the Althoff department store and has since operated as a Freies Kaufhaus and as a Centrum Warenhaus Leipzig. Before 1914 there were the Hôtel de Bavière (first called that in 1768, Hotel Central from 1887) at Petersstrasse 25 and the Gasthof Drei Rosen at Petersstrasse 27.

=== Petersstrasse 39 / 41, Stentzlers Hof ===
In 1914, the Leipzig architect Leopold Stentzler had the houses he owned at Petersstrasse 39 and 41 demolished in order to build the Stentzlers Hof exhibition center, in which primarily paper goods were exhibited. The house was extensively renovated by the builder's heirs from 1994 to 1996. This created something like a covered passage from Petersstrasse to Peterskirchhof.

=== Petersstrasse 43, Former Reichsbank Building ===
The former Reichsbank building at Petersstrasse 43 was built in the Neo-Renaissance style for the Leipzig branch of the Central Bank of the German Empire. After being used by other financial institutions, the house has been the home of the Leipzig “Johann Sebastian Bach” music school since 1999.

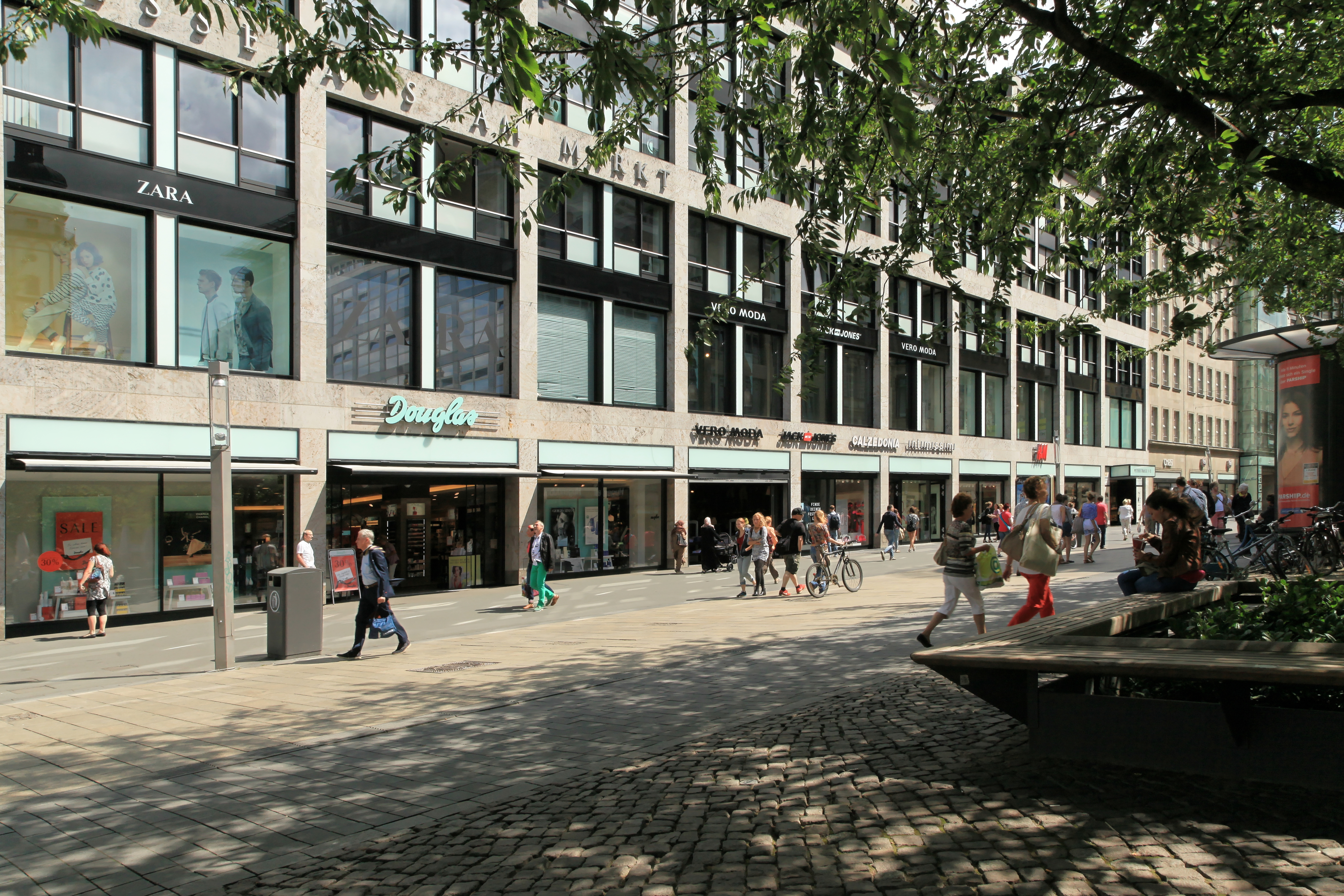
Messehaus am Markt

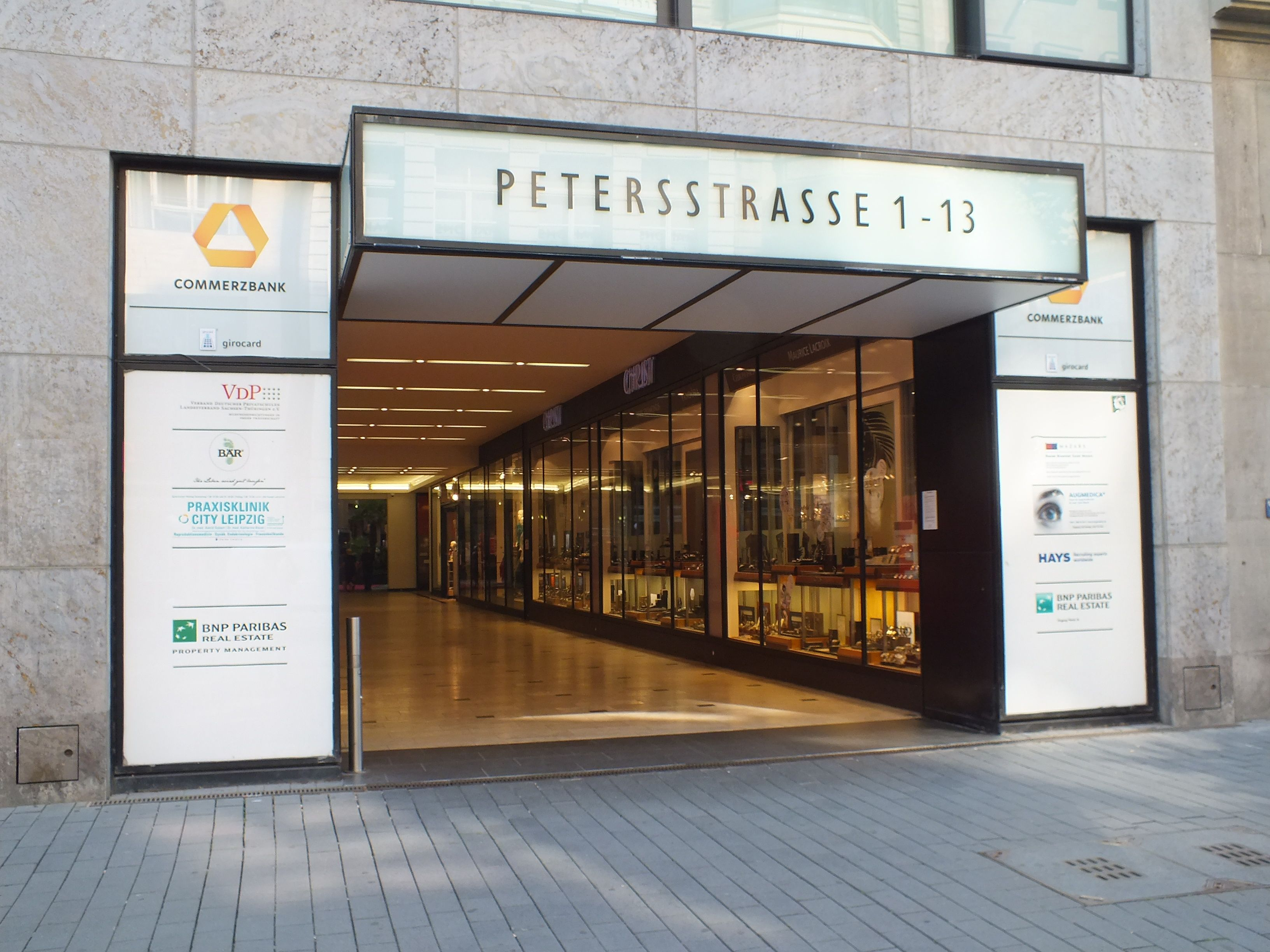
Entrance of the Messehaus Arcade Gallery

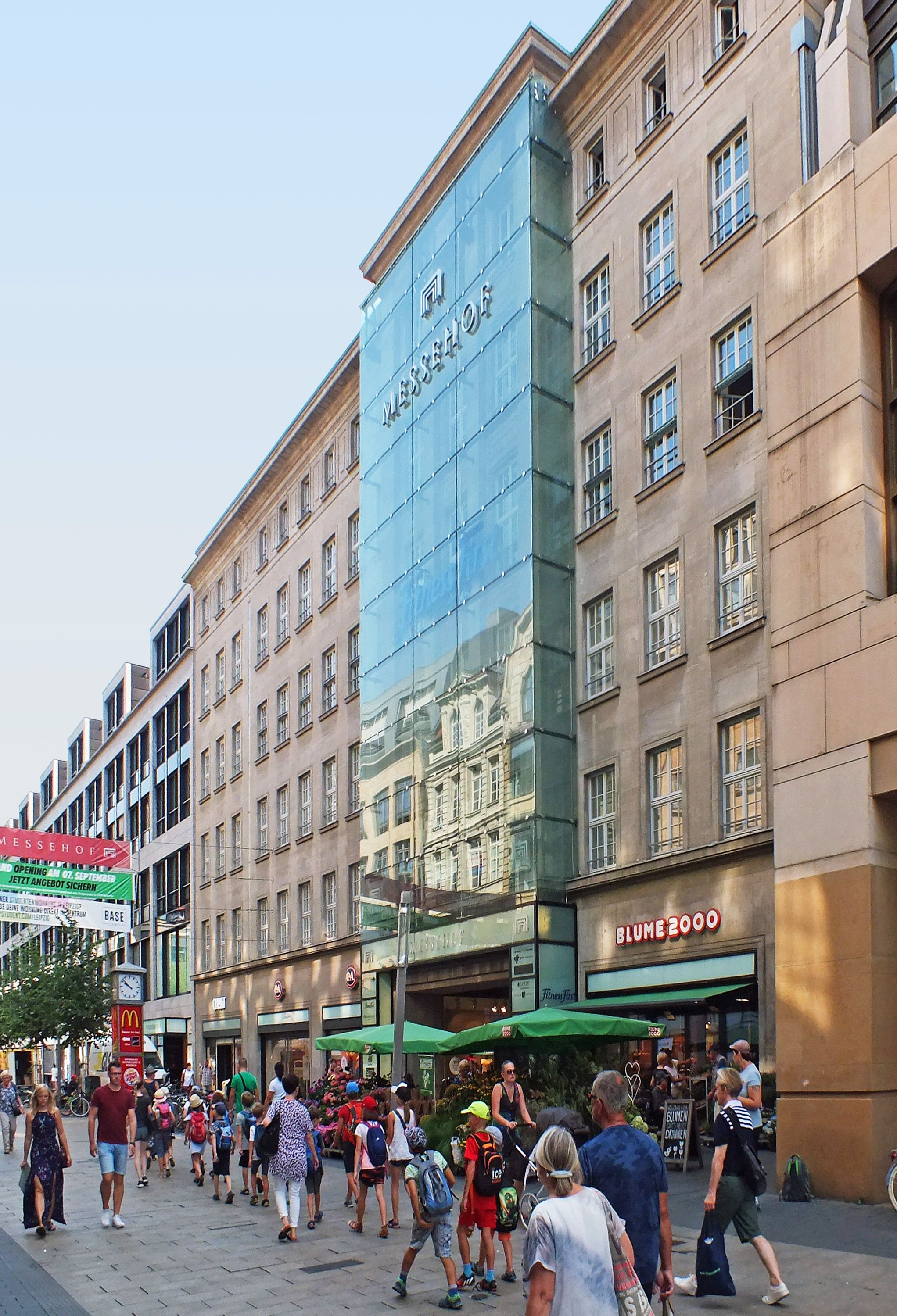
Messehof

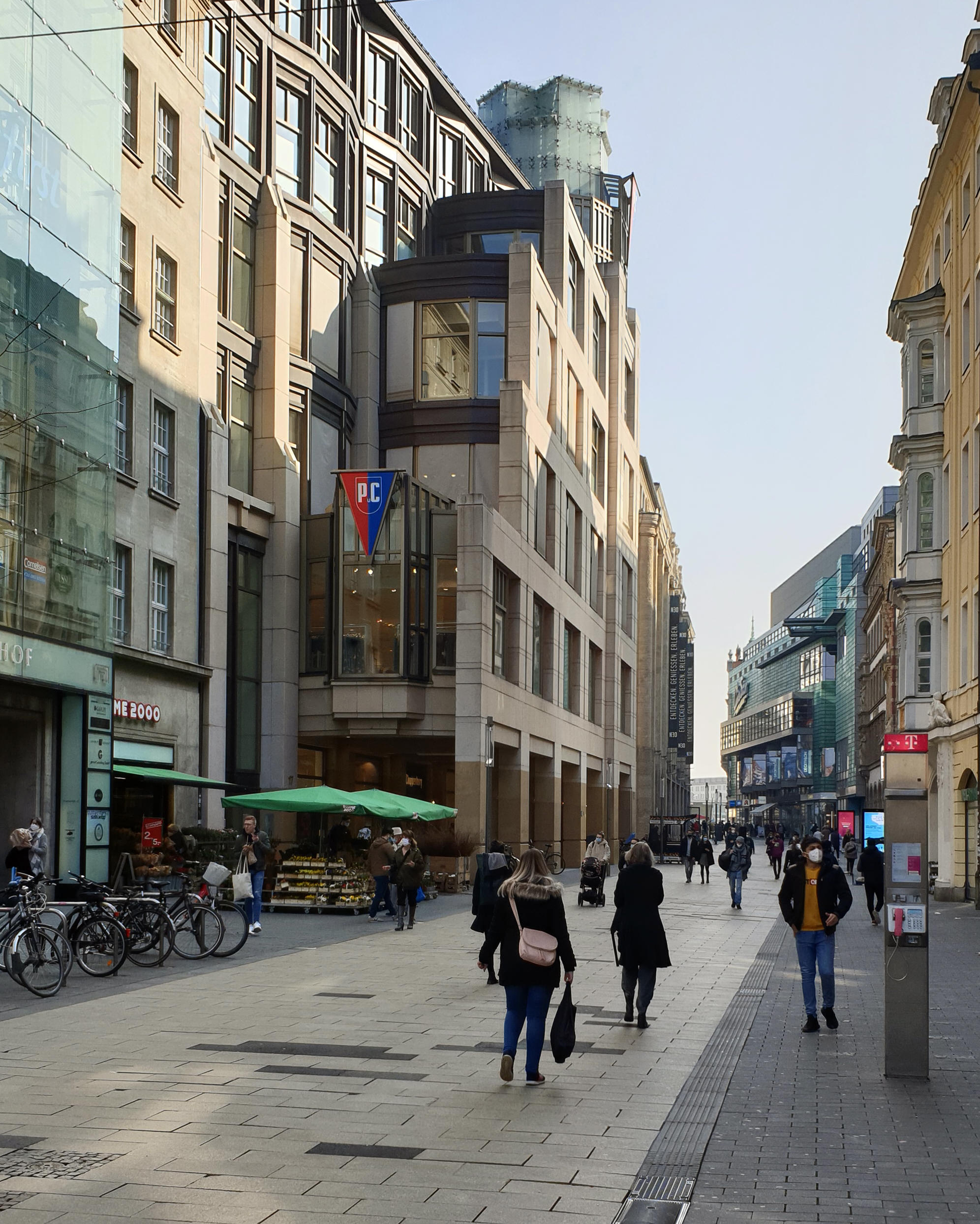
Peek & Cloppenburg

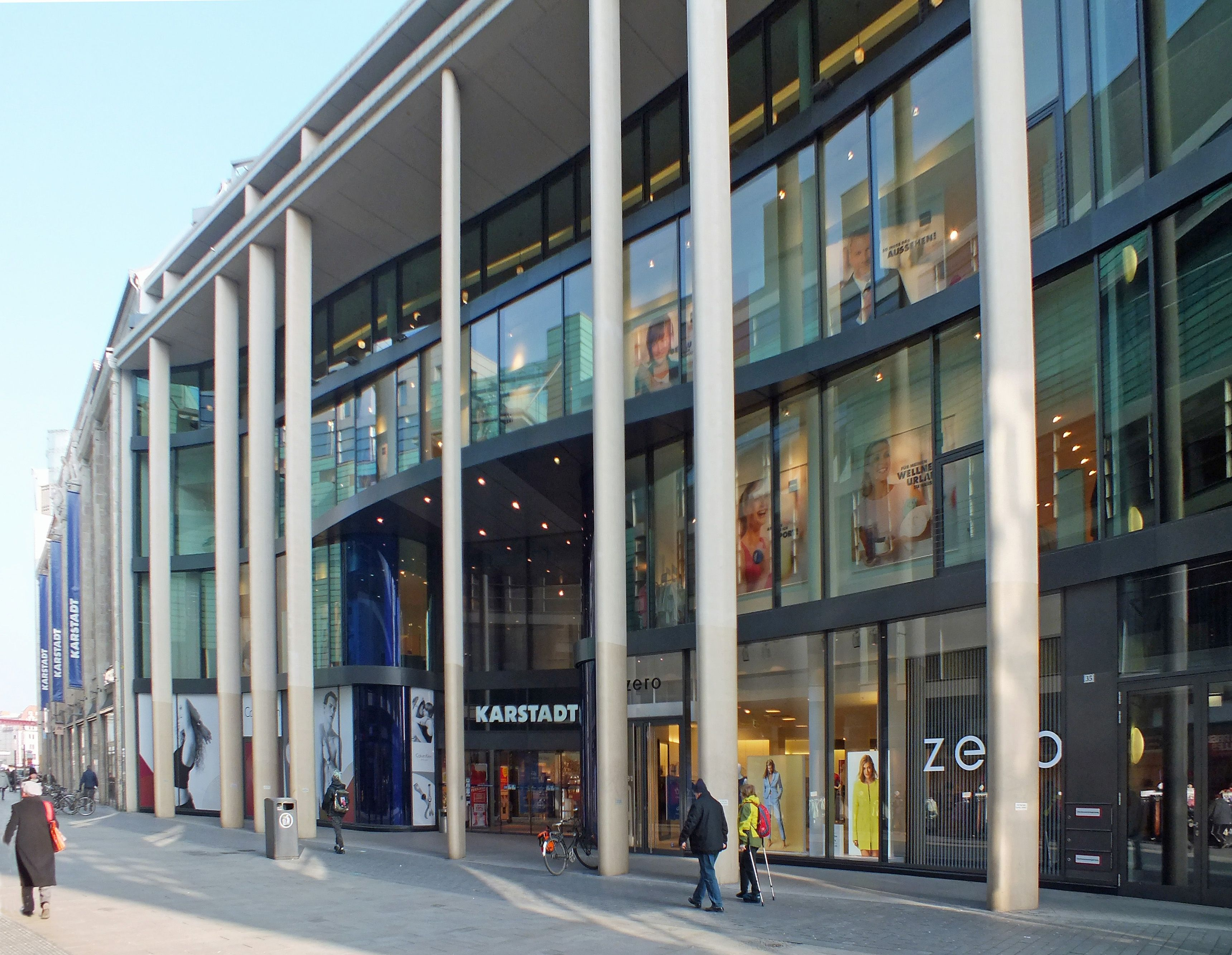
formerly Karstadt Leipzig

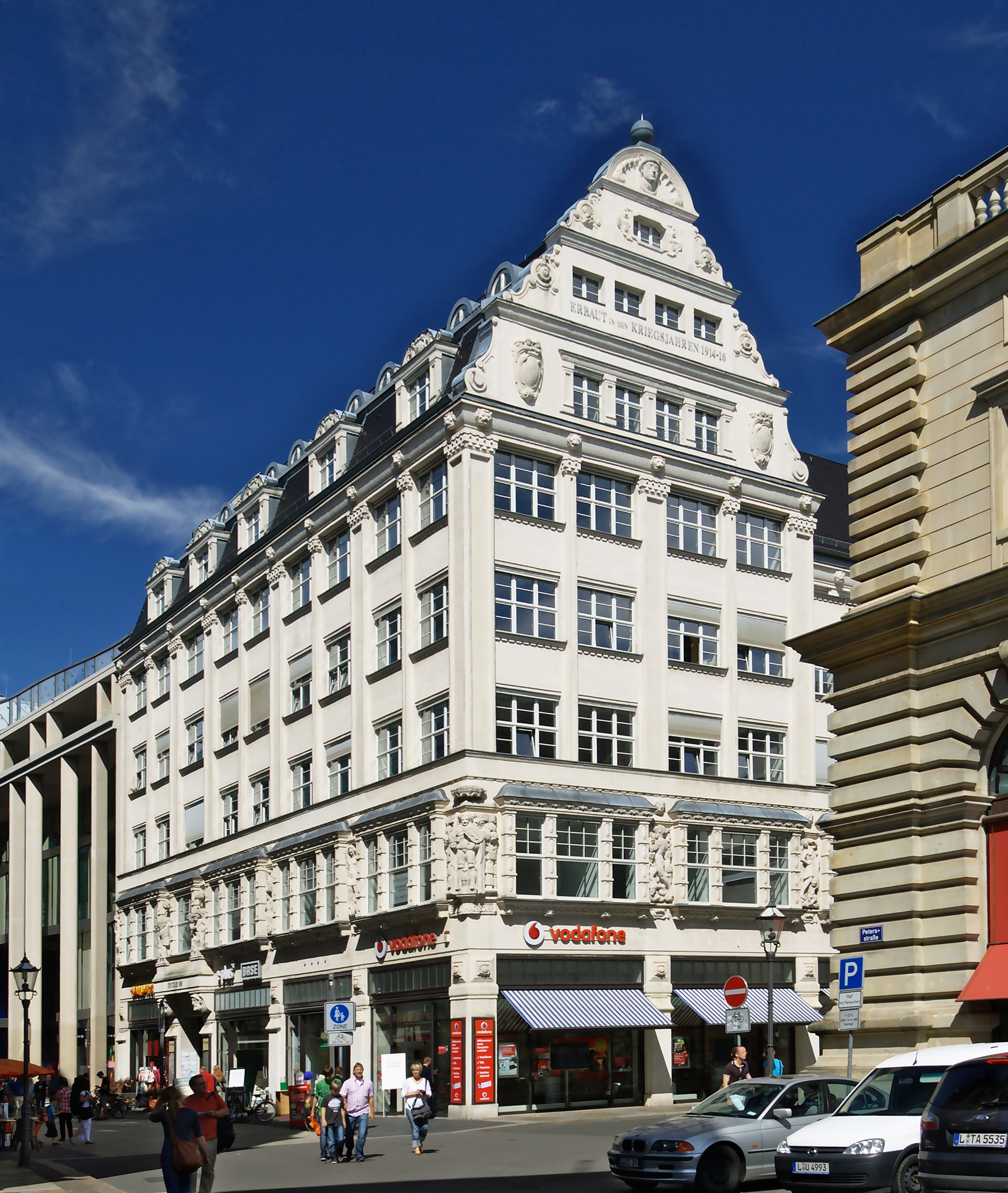
Stenzlers Hof (2010)

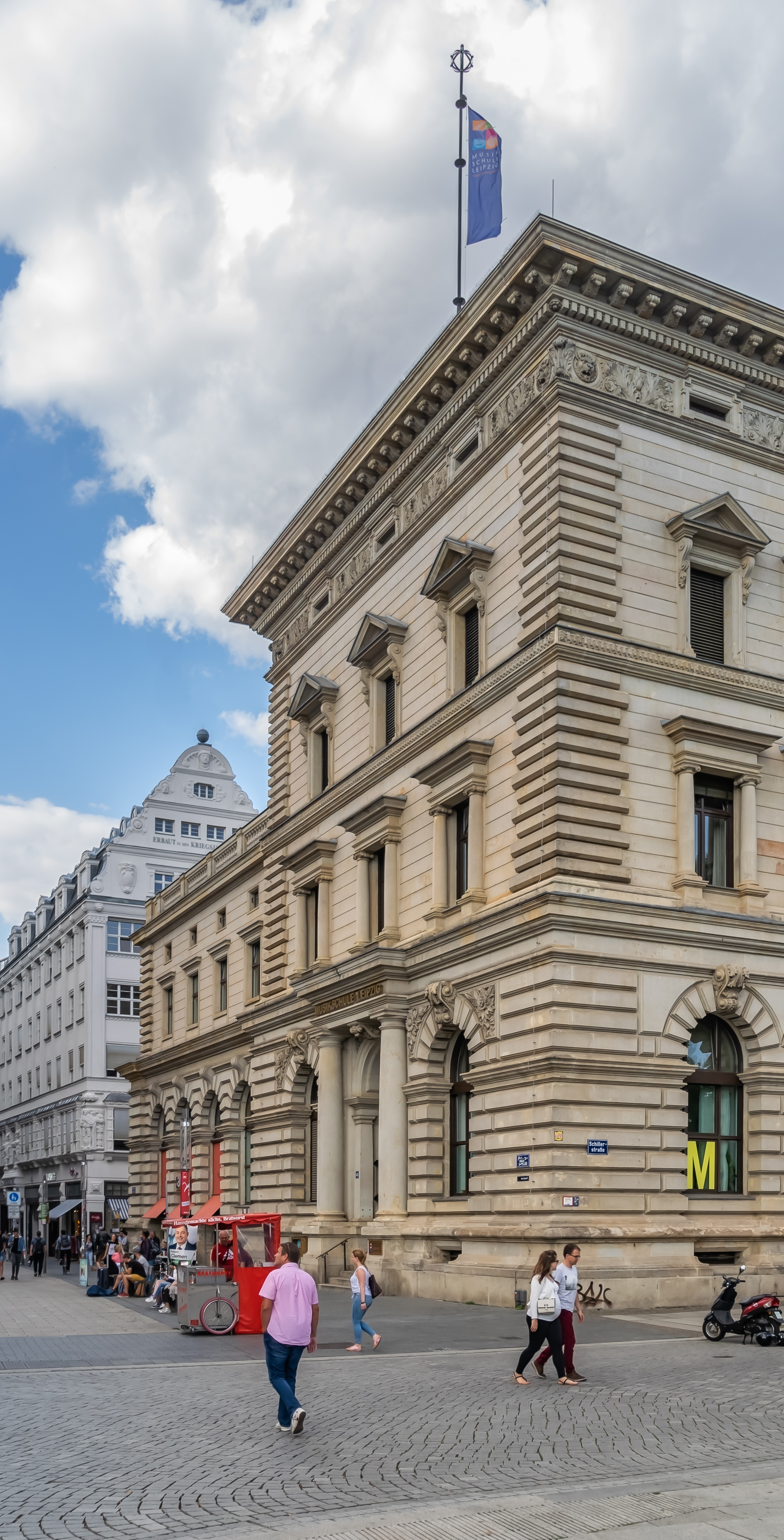
Former Reichsbank building

== Development on the west side ==
Straight house numbers starting from the market

=== Without a number, Curry Cult and the green space called Thomaswiese ===
Before the destruction of the World War II, the west side of Petersstrasse was built up to the market, as can still be seen on the east side today. The Steckner department store with the Steckner Arcade Gallery was located on the property with house number 2. In 1973 the area was initially converted into a green space on an interim basis. In 1997/1998 the open space was landscaped and the Curry Cult snack bar was created.

=== Petersstrasse 12 / 14, House Marquette ===
Also in 1997/98, a 5-story residential and commercial building, Haus Marquette, was built on the edge of the vacant area (main tenant: Hugendubel).

=== Petersstrasse 20, Petershof ===
The Petershof extends between Petersstrasse, Sporergäßchen, Burgstrasse and Thomaskirchhof (at the St. Thomas Church). It was built from 1927 to 1929 as a trade fair building according to plans by the Leipzig architect Alfred Liebig (1878–1952). It also housed the Capitol cinema until 2003 and was converted into a residential and commercial building in 2004/05.

=== Petersstrasse 24, Zum Grönländer ===
The commercial building called “ Zum Grönländer ” (The Greenlander) dates back to the 18th century. After its construction it was called Haugk's House. A member of the von Haugk family became distressed at sea in Greenland, but was guided to a safe bay by an Eskimo approaching in a kayak. In 1885 a relief was attached to the house to commemorate this. When it became an exhibition center in 1908, it officially received its new name. It was carefully renovated between 1992 and 1994 and has been used as a commercial building ever since.

=== Petersstrasse 26, Concentra House ===
The Concentra House, which now houses a clothing store, was built in 1920 as a trade fair center. The previous building came into the possession of the merchant Adolf Heinrich Schletter (1793–1853) in 1836 and was called the “Schletterhaus”. Schletter, one of the founders of the Museum of Fine Arts, bequeathed it to the city in 1853, which sold it in 1863 for the benefit of the Schletter Foundation.

=== Petersstrasse 32 / 34, Drei Könige (The Three Kings) ===
In 1680 there was an inn called “Zu den drei Königen”. The name has been preserved over the centuries, even when two houses next to each other were demolished in 1915 to make room for an exhibition center. This was the center of the shoe fair for over 70 years. After 1990, the exhibition center was converted into an office building.

=== Petersstrasse 36, Petersbogen ===
From 1999 to 2001, the new Petersbogen building complex was built with a curved arcade gallery between Petersstrasse and Schloßgasse. The property has a varied history, it belonged to the Leipzig University in the 15th century, was confiscated by the sovereign, then belonged to the university again and was converted into a trade fair palace in 1919, which was destroyed in the bombing raid on 4 December 1943. Part of the current building complex is used by the university as a juridicum. There are also shops, the Cinestar multiplex cinema and a casino here.

=== Petersstraße 48, Klinger House ===
The soap and perfumery manufacturer Heinrich Louis Klinger (1816–1896), father of the painter Max Klinger, acquired several buildings here in the 19th century, which he demolished in 1887 and replaced with plans by the Leipzig architect Arwed Roßbach (1844–1902) by a representative new building built in the Neo-Renaissance style. The building has borne the name of the owner family since 1905.

=== Markgrafenstraße 2, Merkur House ===
The Merkur House, which marks the entrance to Petersstrasse, has as its address Markgrafenstrasse, which meets Schillerstrasse and Petersstrasse here. The name of the house, built in 1936–1937, refers to the previous building, which had a statue of Mercurius. The previous building was Jewish-owned and was forcibly aryanized by the Nazis.

After being used by trade fairs and scientific institutions, the building has been a commercial building again since 1991.

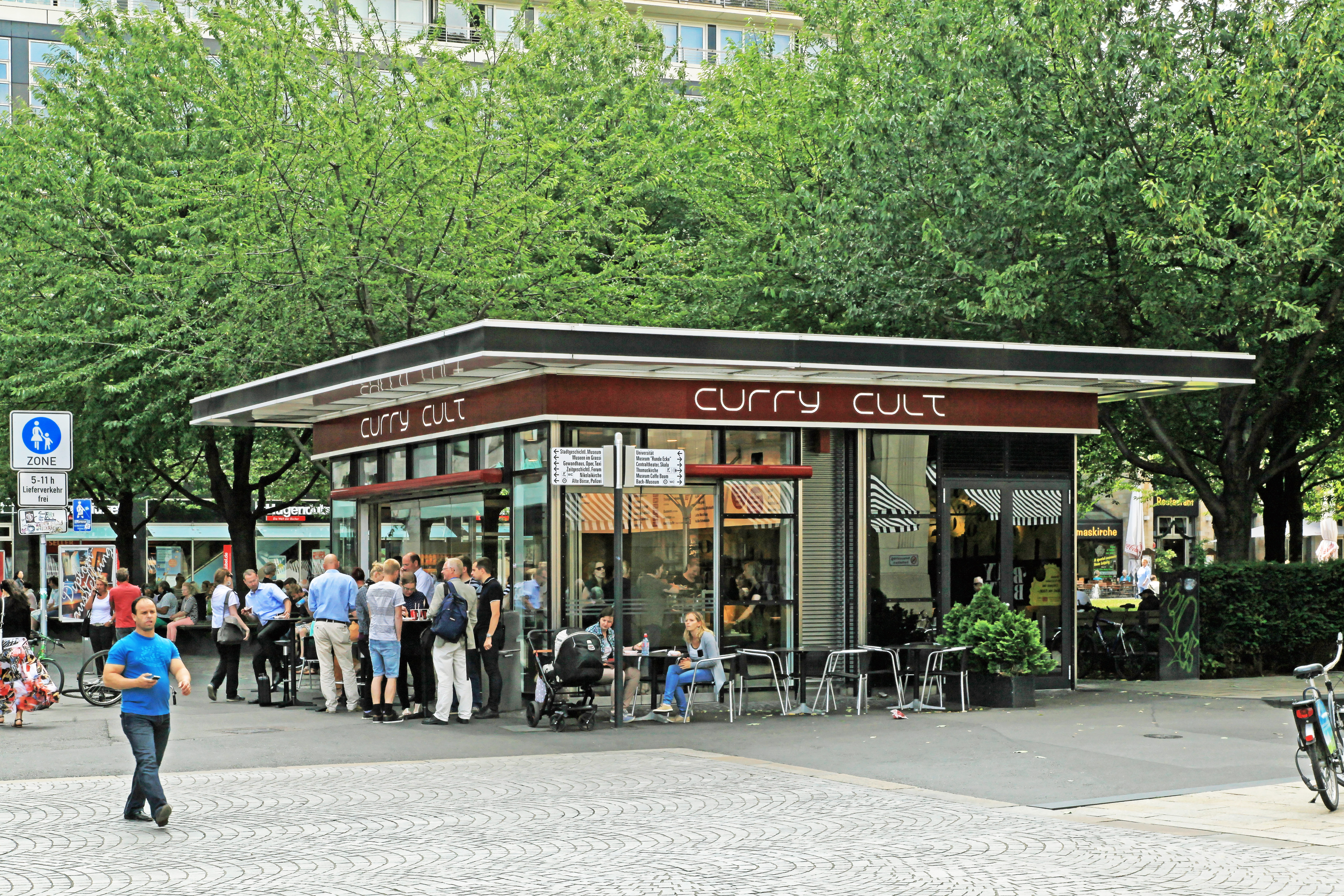
Curry Cult Snack Bar

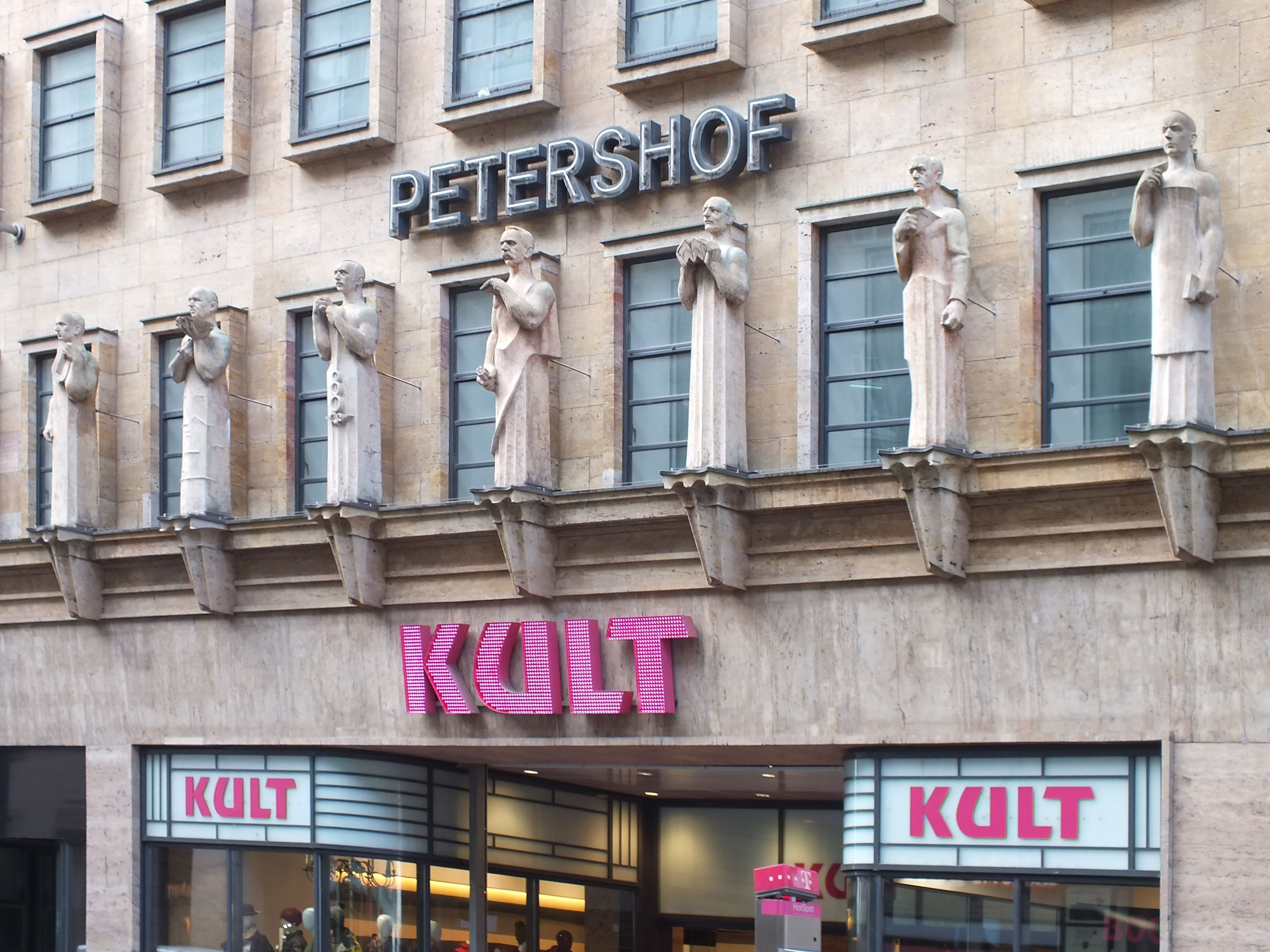
Petershof

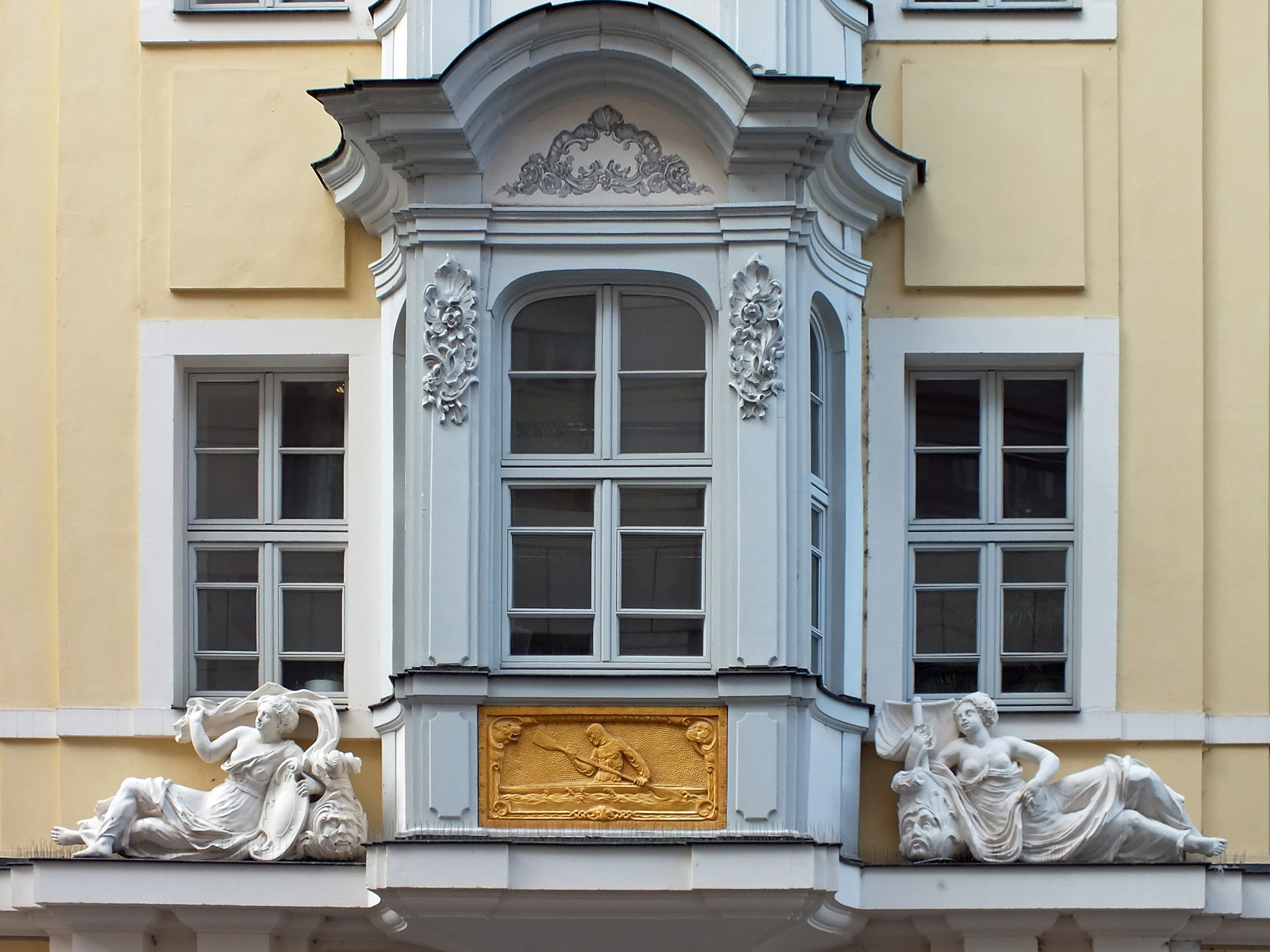
Zum Grönländer (The Greenlander)

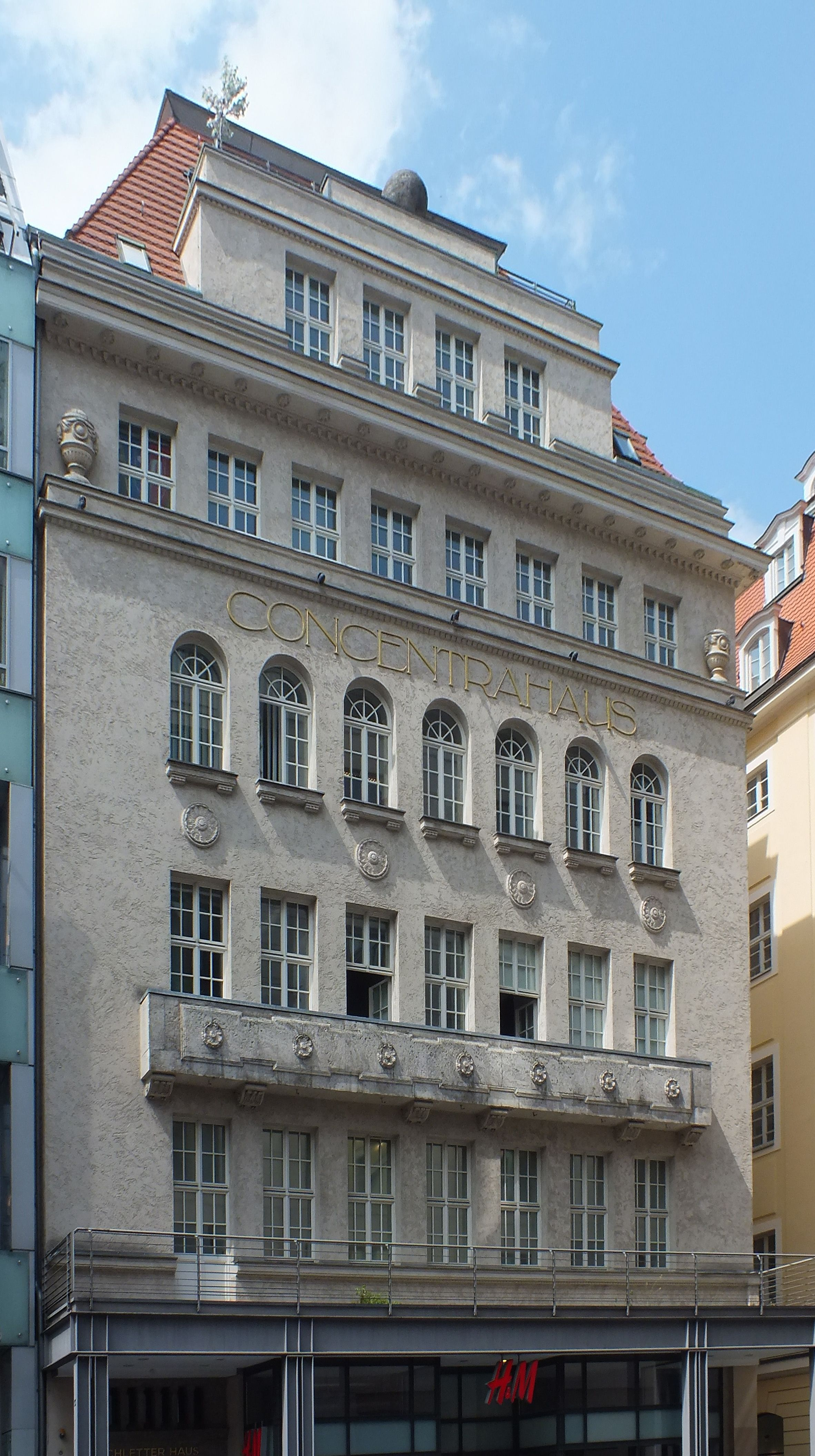
Concentra House

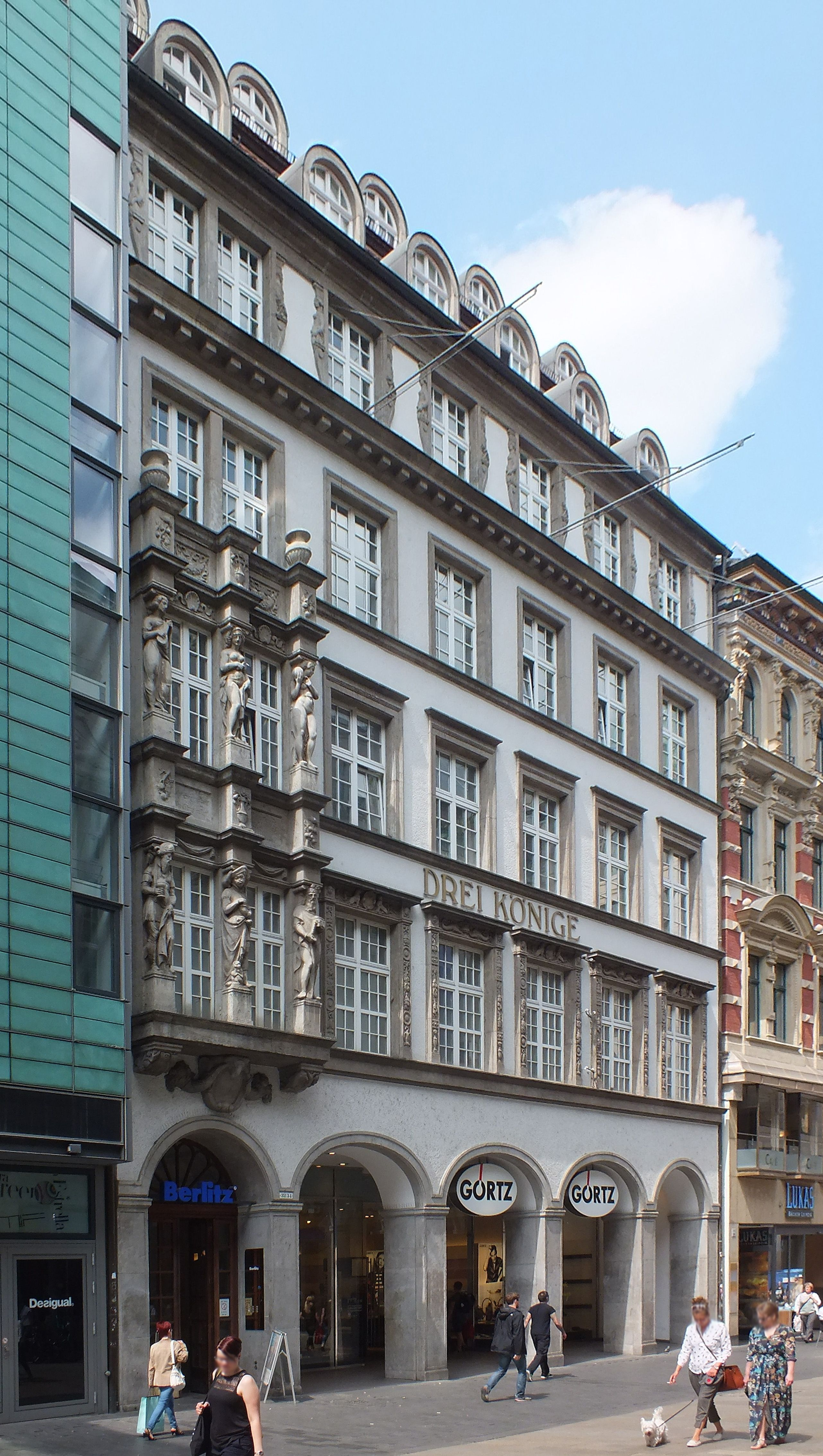
Haus Drei Könige (The Three Kings)

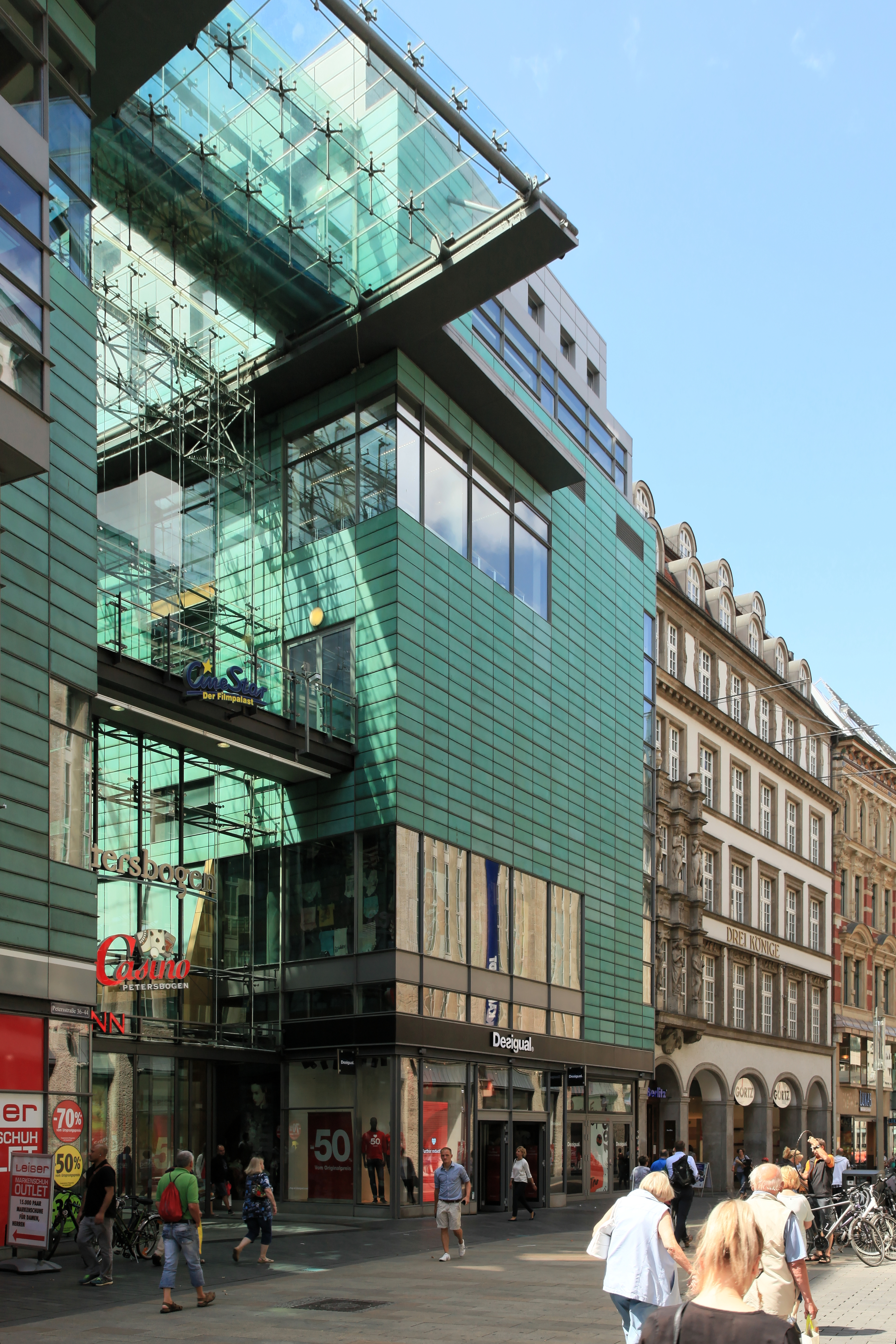
Petersbogen

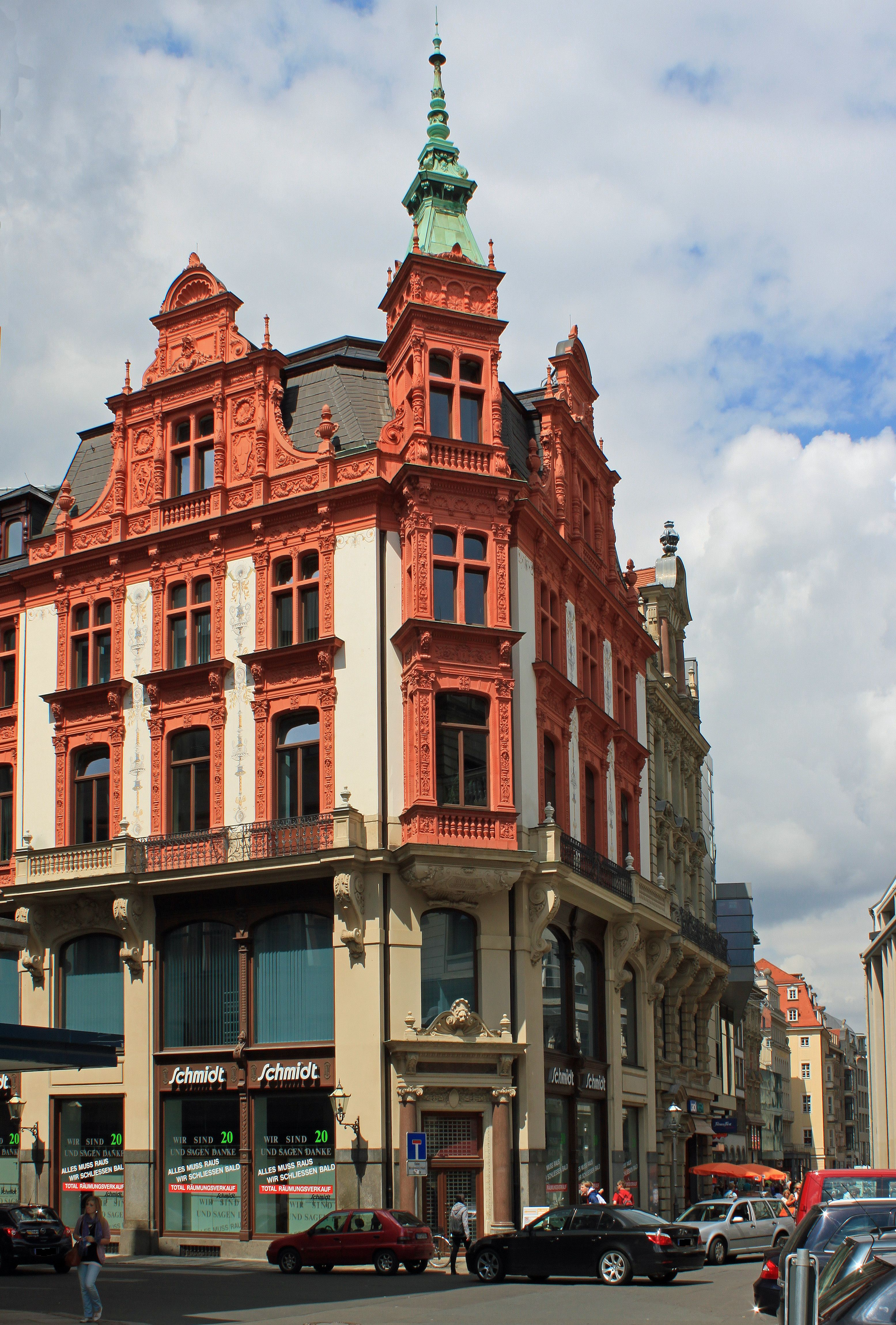
Klinger House

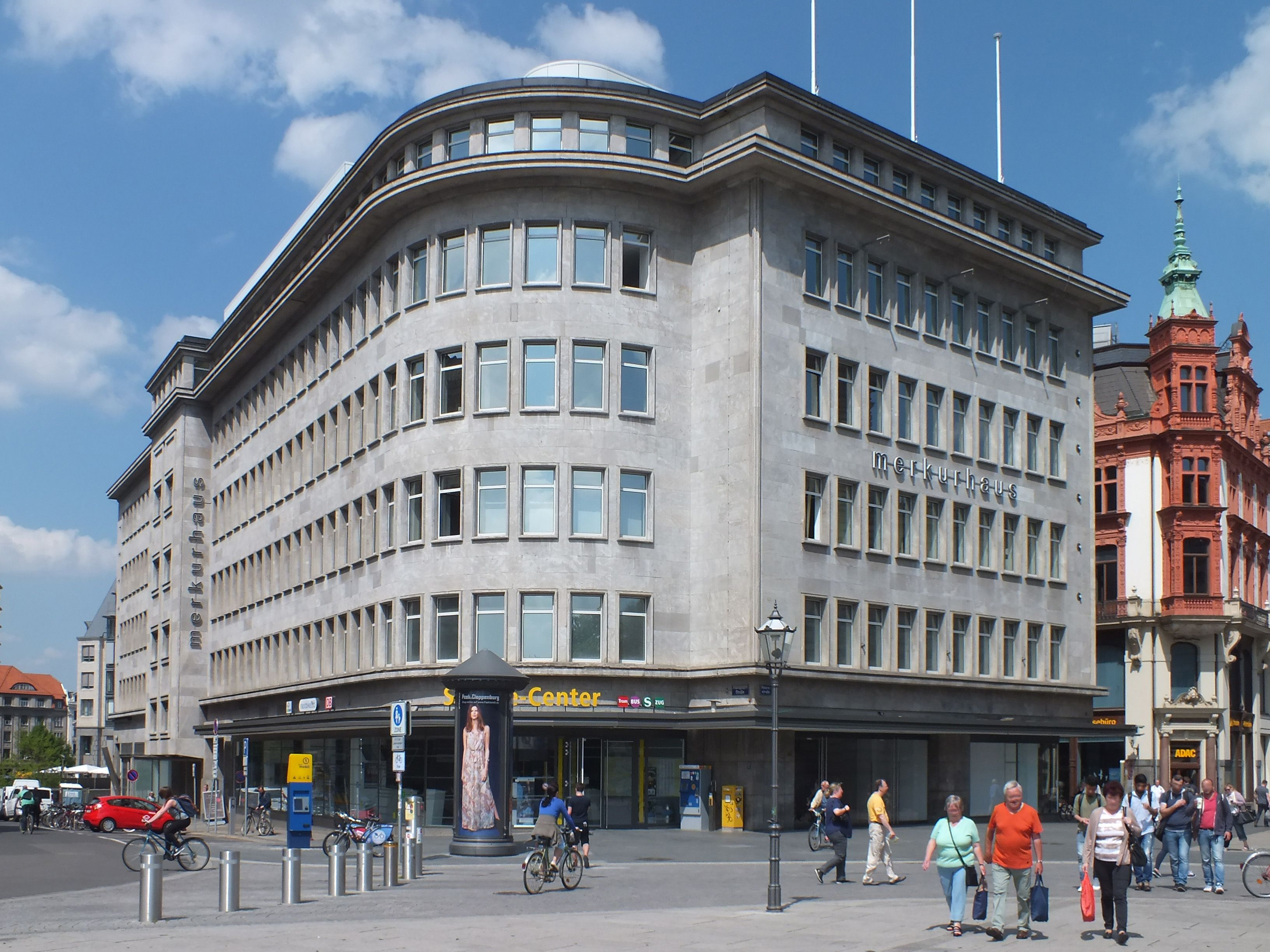
Merkur House

== See also ==
- List of arcade galleries in Leipzig
- List of streets and squares in Leipzig

== Literature ==
- Horst Riedel: Stadtlexikon Leipzig von A bis Z. PRO LEIPZIG, Leipzig 2012, ISBN 978-3-936508-82-6, p. 461 f. (in German)
