= Mädler Arcade Gallery =

- Mädlerpassage (German)
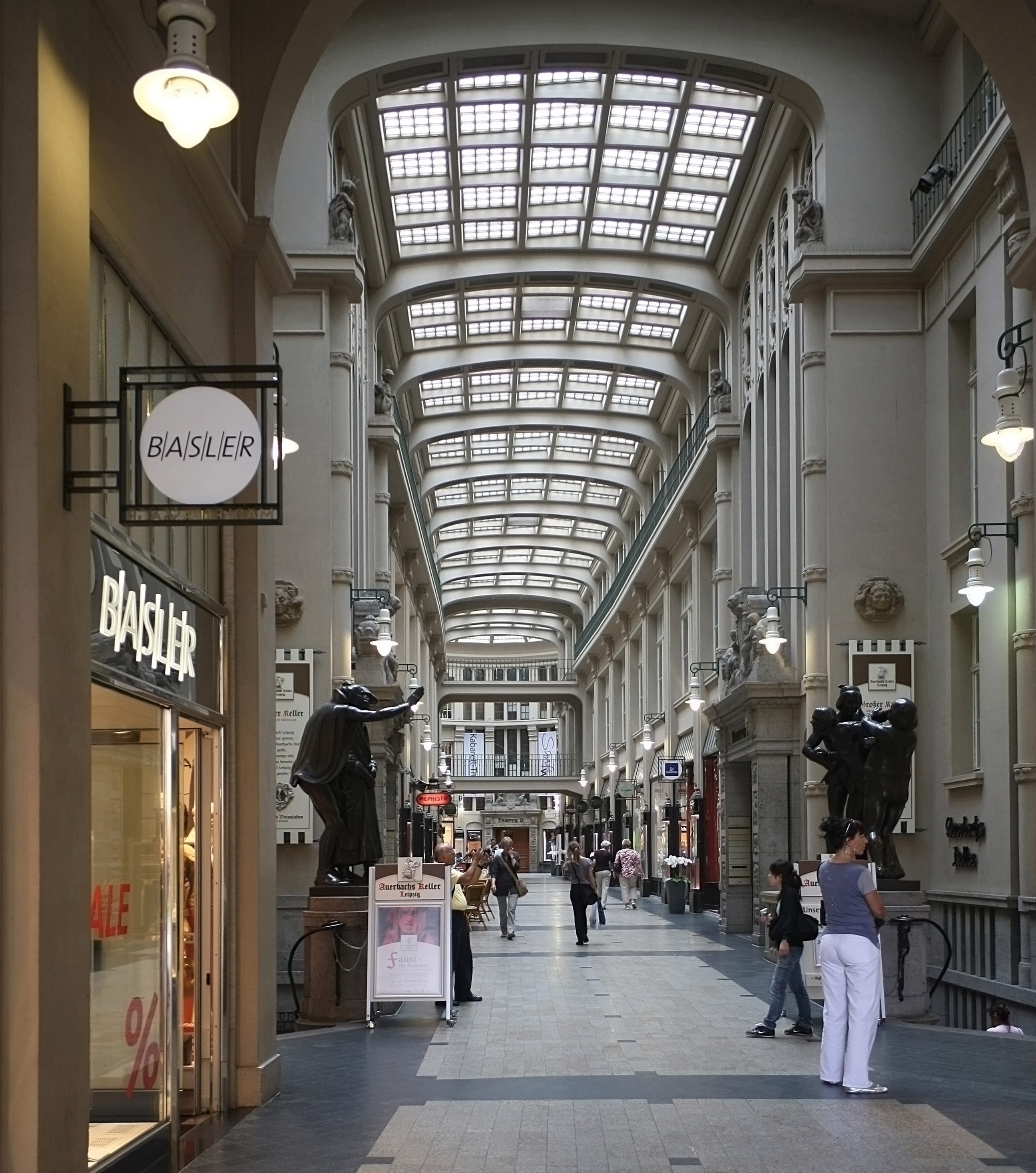
- Mädler Arcade Gallery (2009)
- Location: Leipzig
- Coordinates: 51.339081°N 12.375450°E
- Address: Grimmaische Straße 2–4, Neumarkt 14
- Opened: 1914
- Owner: MIB Group
- Architect: Theodor Kösser
- Num. of stores: more than 20
- Floors: 5
- Public transit: Leipzig Markt station
- Website: http://www.maedlerpassage.de/en/

The Mädler Arcade Gallery (Mädlerpassage) is the last completely preserved historic shopping arcade covered by an end-to-end glass roof in the city center of Leipzig. It is a facility of upmarket retail, restaurants, offices and cultural establishments.

== Description ==
The arcade gallery consists of three arms, arranged in a T-shape. At the point where the three arms meet there is an octagonal rotunda with a diameter of around 12 m (39.4 ft). The longer arm from Grimmaische Strasse to the rotunda was built first and is around 75 m (246.1 ft) long. Similar to the building's model, the Galleria Vittorio Emanuele II in Milan, the passage is delimited by street facades drawn inwards. In this section, the 6 m (19.7 ft) to 7 m (23.0 ft) wide passageway is covered by a glass roof in a steel ribbed construction above the second floor at a height of around 13 m (42.7 ft). There are two more floors above this.

As a second construction phase, the arm of the arcade gallery from the rotunda to Neumarkt was built shortly afterwards, so that the floor plan was expanded to an L. It was not until 1963–65, when the exhibition center Messehaus am Markt of the Leipzig Trade Fair was built, that the third arm of the arcade gallery was added to Petersstrasse, creating today's T-shape. The connection from Neumarkt to Petersstrasse is 110 m (360.9 ft) long. The most recently added section is only ground floor height and is artificially lit.

In the first section of the gallery there is access to the historic Auerbachs Keller wine cellar. Here is the double statue of two groups of bronze figures by Mathieu Molitor (1873–1929). It features Faust and Mephistopheles on one side, a group of enchanted students on the other, as a quote from the Auerbach's Cellar scene in Goethe's Faust.

In addition to the historic Auerbachs Keller in the basement, there are over 20 small shops and restaurants in the passage. The upper floors offer, among other things, space for offices, the Sanftwut cabaret and an art room measuring 250 m^{2} (2,691.0 sq ft).

== History ==
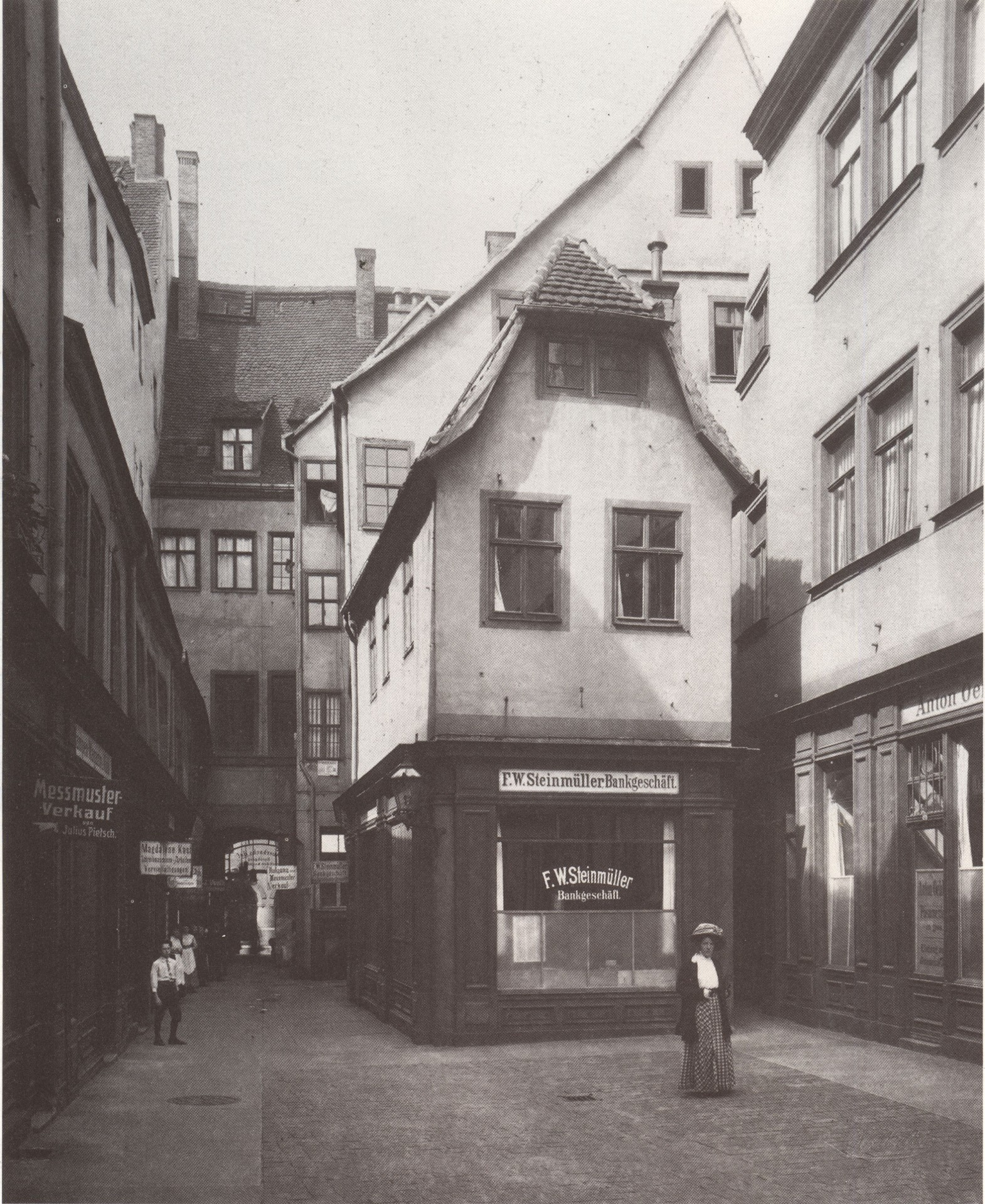
Auerbachs Hof around 1905

Between 1530 and 1911, there was the Auerbachs Hof building complex on the property. On 1 January 1911, Auerbach's Hof and a neighboring property were sold to the suitcase and leather manufacturer Anton Mädler (1864–1925). He let all the buildings be demolished and built the Mädler exhibition center from 1912 to 1914 according to plans by the architect Theodor Kösser.

A five-story passage building was created with a 142 m (465.9 ft) long, four-story passage. The arched portal at the passage entrance is flanked by two life-size female figures in robes carrying grapes and a vase. They refer to the purpose of the house as a wine cellar (Auerbachs Keller) and exhibition center for the porcelain, ceramics and earthenware sectors (exhibition area 5,700 m^{2} (61,354.3 sq ft)). Since 1969 there has been a porcelain carillon made of Meissen porcelain in the rotunda of the passage. The complex was used as an exhibition center until 1989.

After reunification, Jürgen Schneider bought the majority of the property from the Mädler community of heirs in 1991 for 80 million DM. He wanted to renovate the arcade gallery. That didn't happen after his company went bankrupt. "These events went down as spectacular criminal case in the German economic history and are reminiscent of the unrestrained private investments during the building boom in the early 1990s".

In 1995 Commerzbank took over the majority. From 1995 to 1997, the arcade gallery was extensively renovated and given a new use. Commerzbank sold its majority stake in Maedler-Passage Property GmbH & Co. KG in 2008 to a company in the MIB Group, Berlin/Leipzig. The remaining shares belong to Anton Mädler's granddaughter.

In december 2023, activists of the Last Generation (climate movement) sprayed paint on the christmas tree in the rotunda of the Mädler Arcade Gallery.

== Picture gallery ==
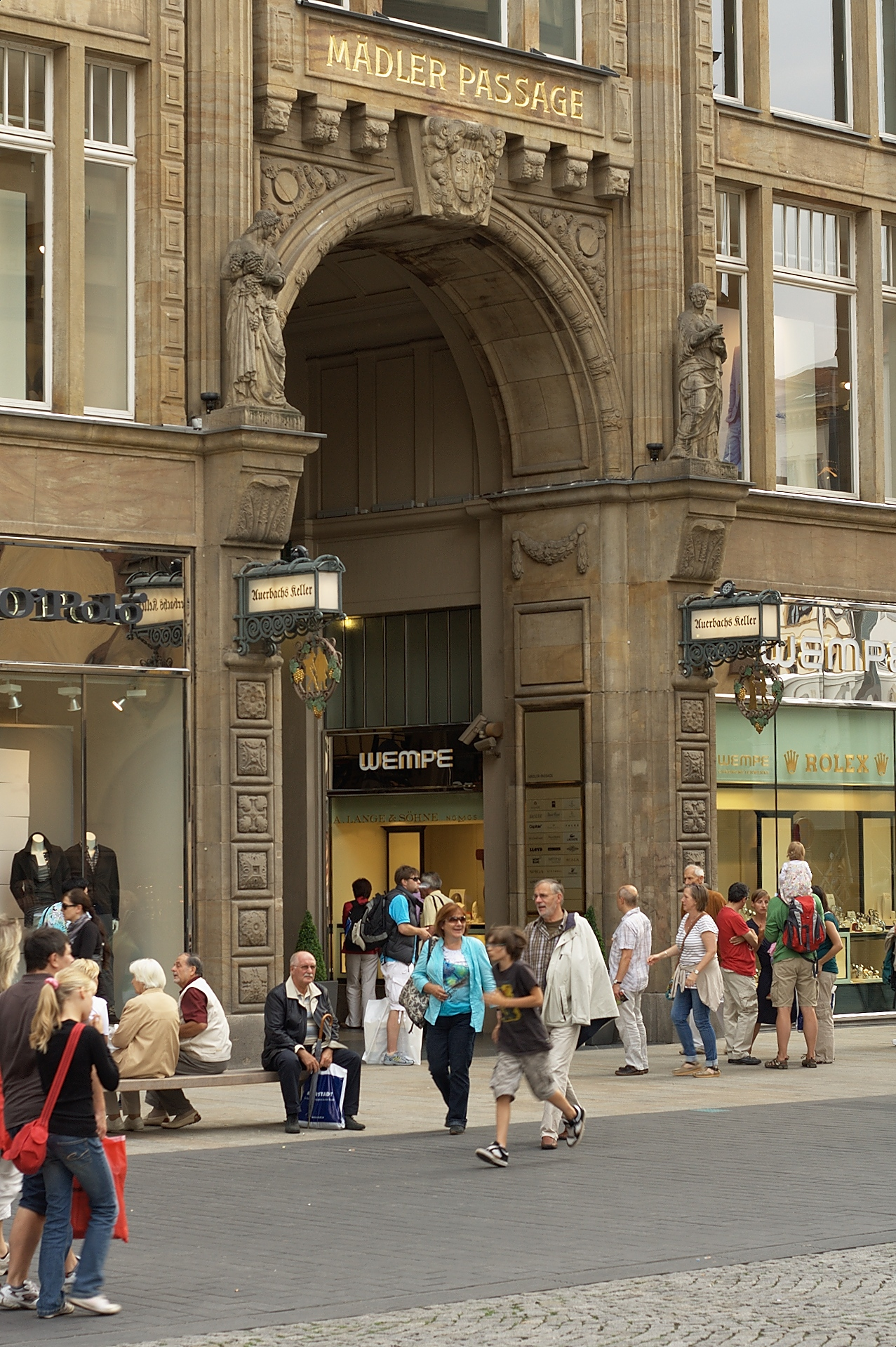
Entrance from Grimmaische Strasse

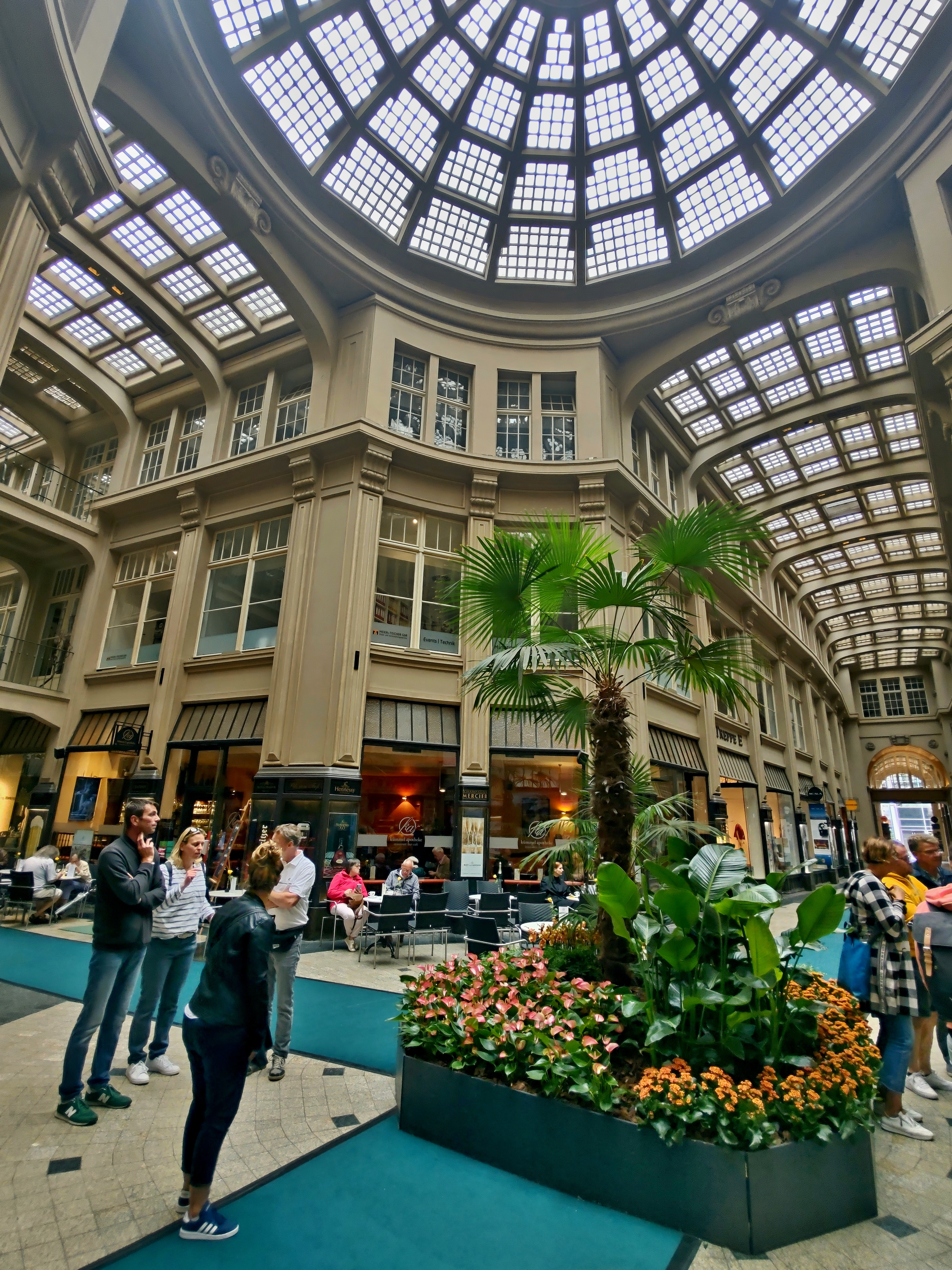
In the rotunda of the Mädler Arcade Gallery

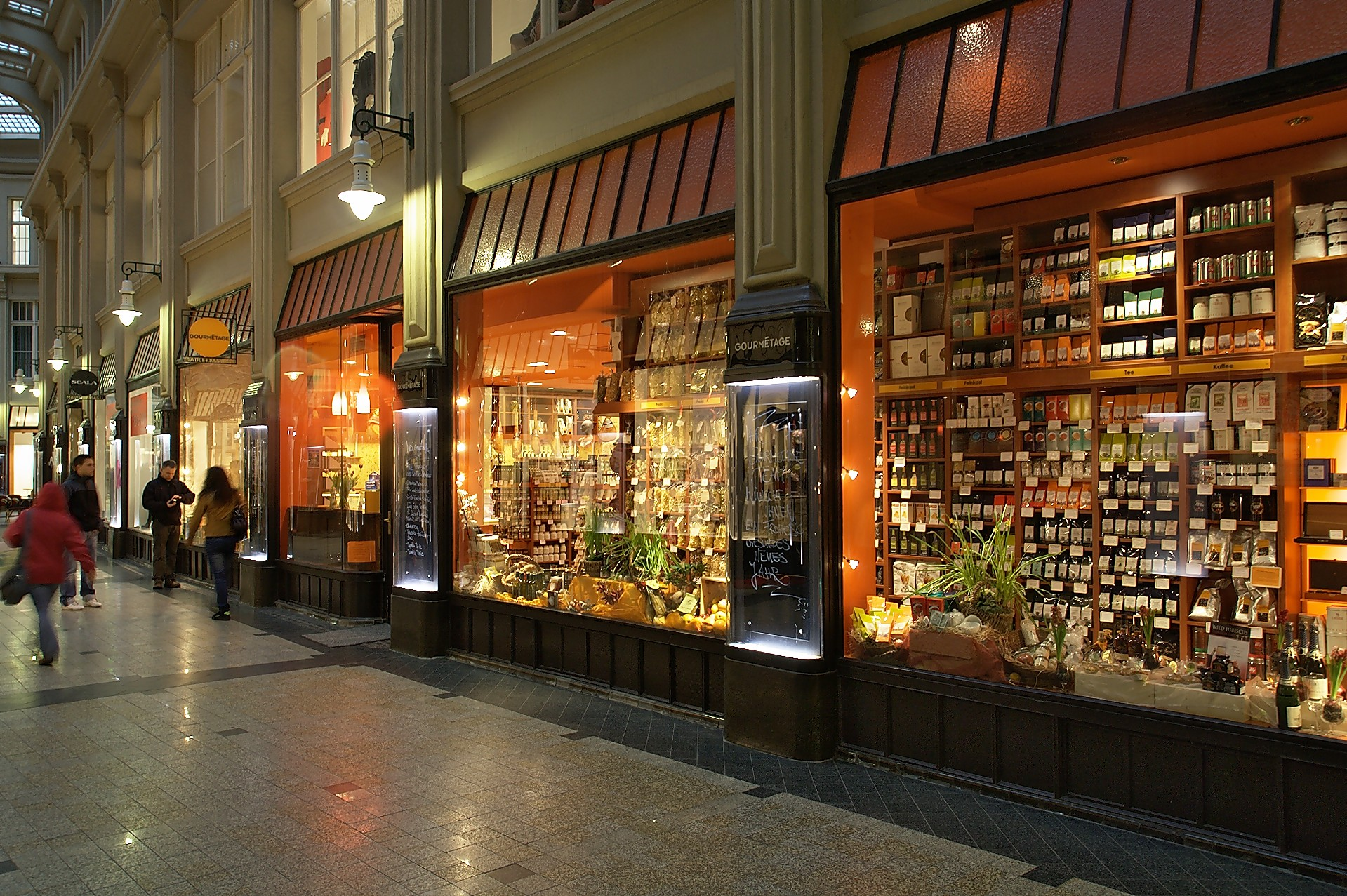
Shops in the Mädler Arcade Gallery

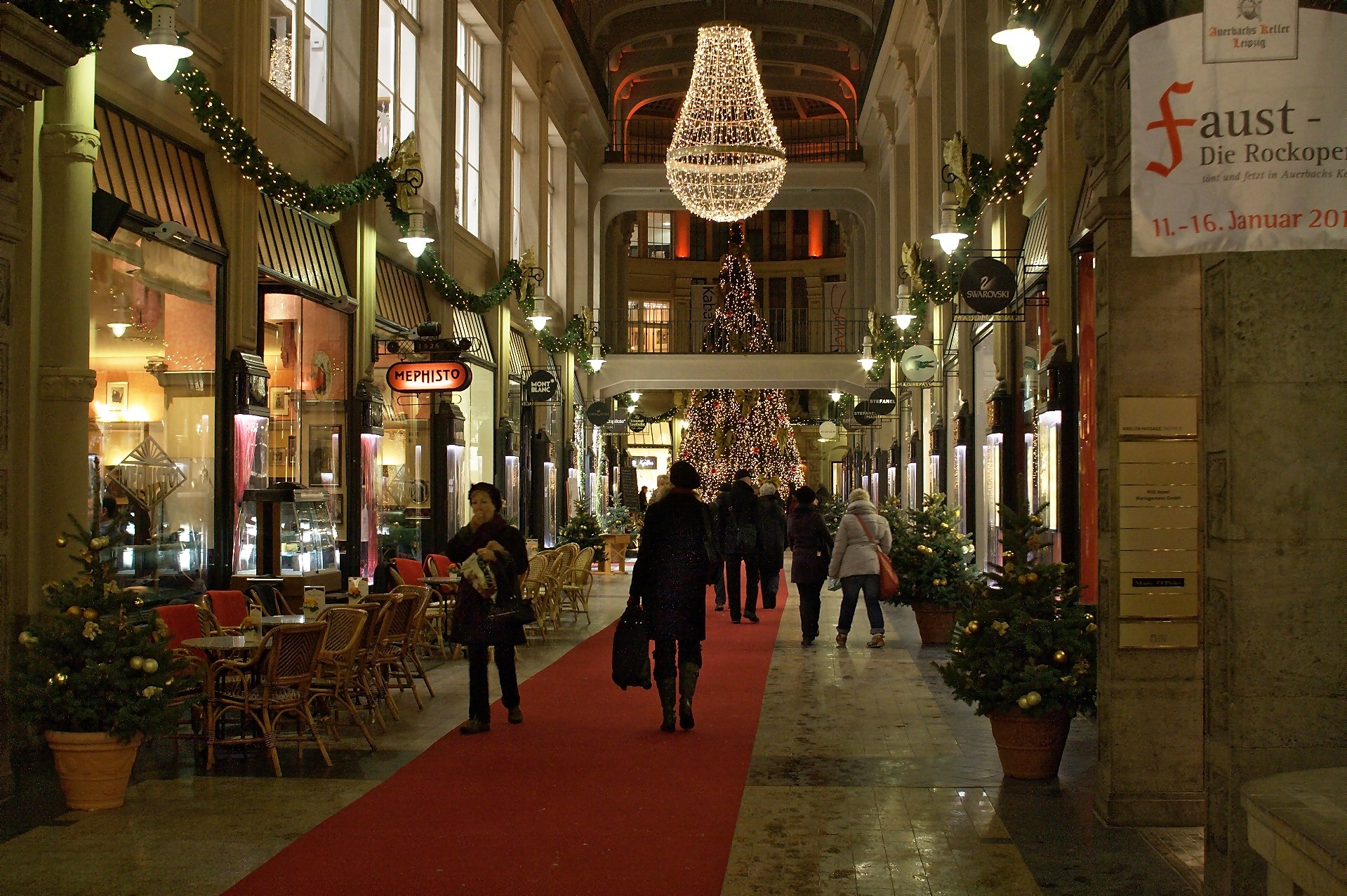
Mädler Arcade Gallery with christmas decoration

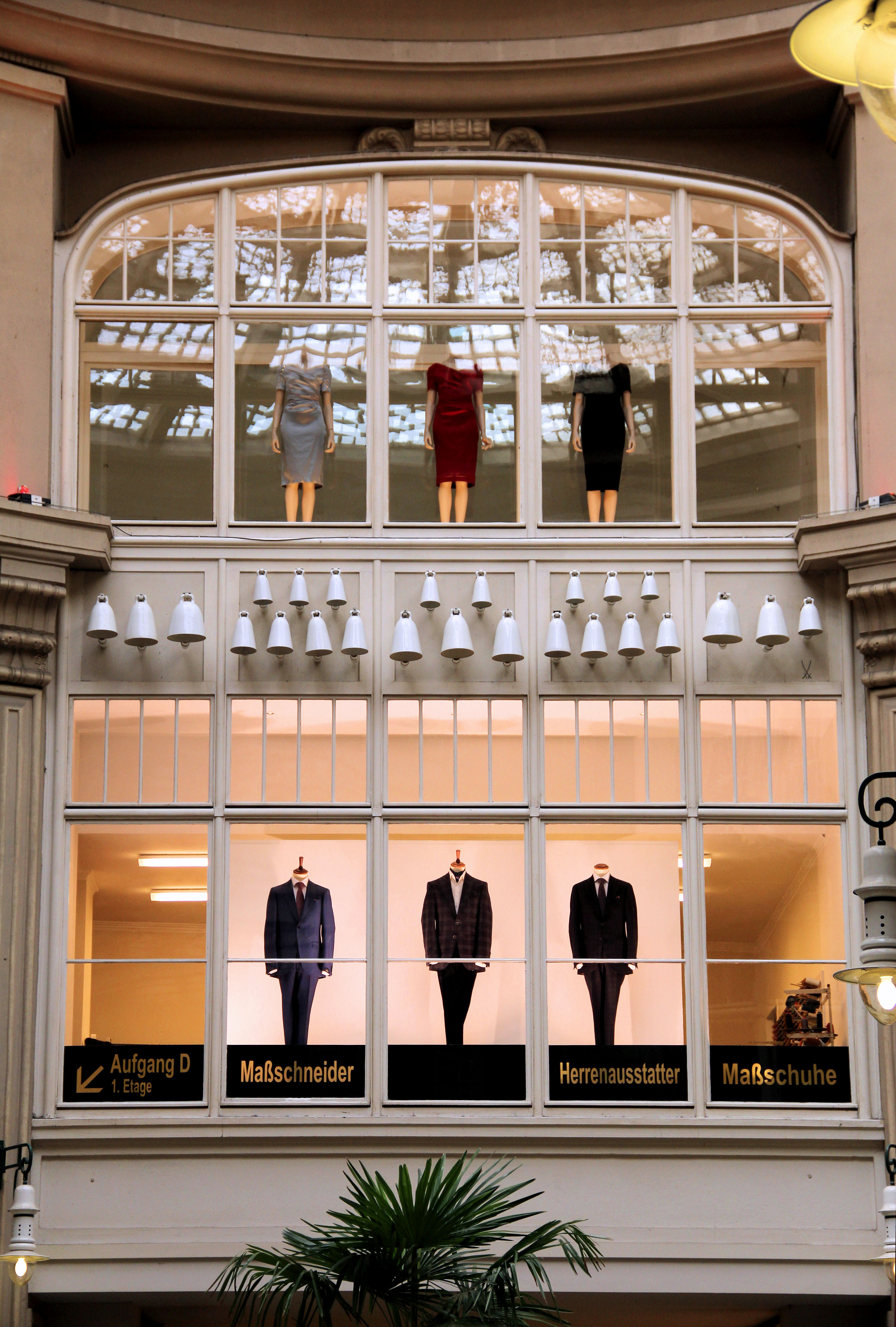
Porcelain carillon

== See also ==
- Arcade (architecture)
- List of arcade galleries in Leipzig
- Bruno Mädler
