= Bruno Mädler =

German businessman (1855–1917)

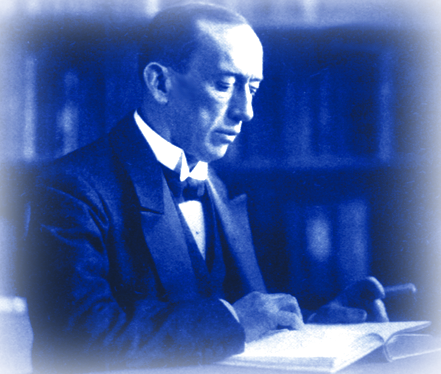
Mädler

Bruno Mädler (April 15, 1855 in Leipzig – 1917 in Berlin) was a German businessman. He became known for founding the Bruno Mädler mechanical engineering company in 1882, which is still active worldwide under the company name Mädler in the fourth generation.

== Life ==
Bruno Mädler came from an entrepreneurial family. He was born to Carl Moritz and Eleonora (née Grumpelt) in Leipzig. In 1850 his father founded the suitcase and bag factory Moritz Mädler, which was continued after his death by Bruno's elder brothers Paul Moritz and Anton Mädler. Bruno Mädler grew up in Leipzig. In 1912, his brother Anton initiated the construction of the Mädlerpassage in Leipzig based on the model of the Galleria Vittorio Emanuele II in Milan. He was married to Clara Mädler (née Riehm), who gave birth to their son Walter on August 22, 1881 in Berlin.

== Work ==
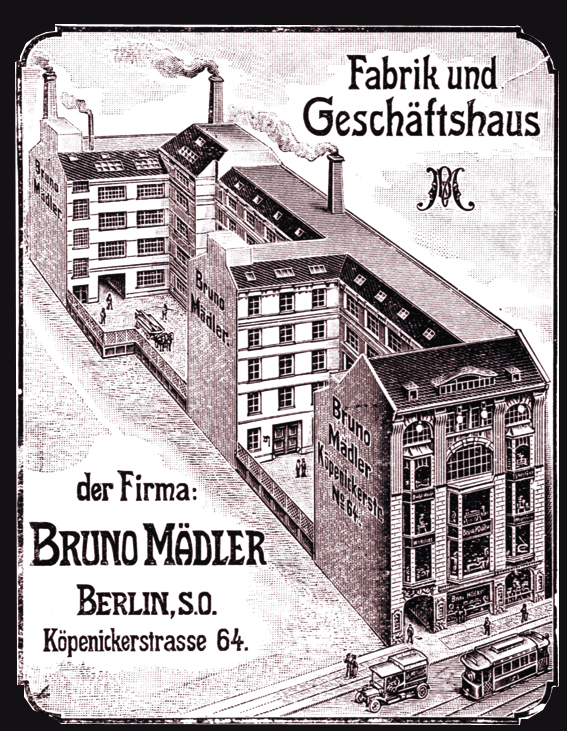
Mädler factory and office building, Köpenicker Str. 64, Berlin (1905)

On November 9, 1882, Bruno Mädler founded a business in Berlin with fittings for the building industry, tools, foundry articles, patented door closers, door fittings, rivets, screws and nuts. After his death, his only son Walter continued the company. Walter Mädler's wife Irma was a born Hoffmann and related to the German entrepreneur Hugo Hoffmann from Berlin, who became known in 1881 with the chocolate brand Sarotti. In the 1930s, the Mädler company had around 300 employees and was one of the leading tool and mechanical engineering companies in Germany.
