= Leipzig Wilhelm-Leuschner-Platz station =

Railway halt in Leipzig, Germany

Leipzig Wilhelm-Leuschner-Platz
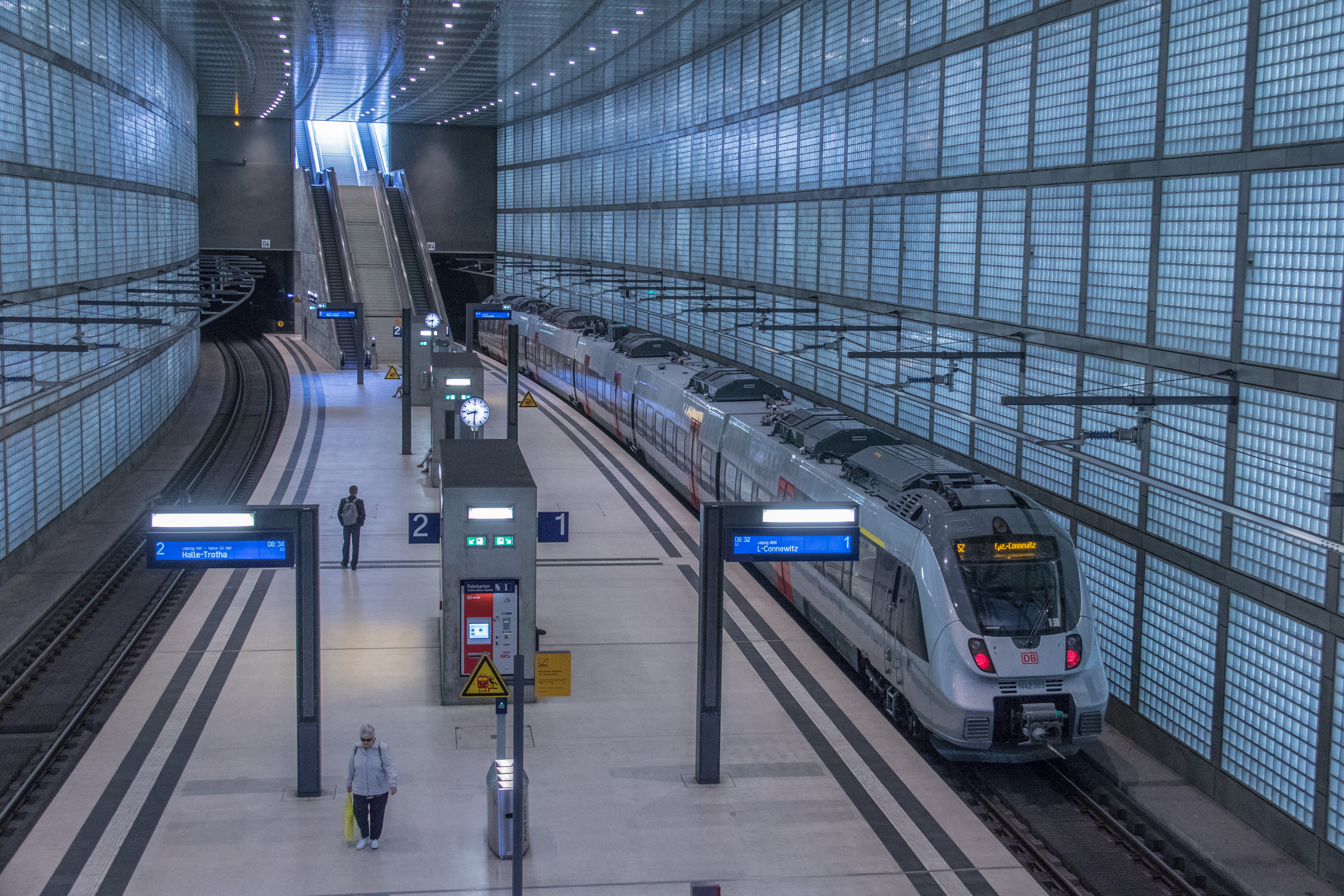
- Leipzig Wilhelm-Leuschner-Platz station

General information
- Location: Leipzig, Saxony; Germany
- Coordinates: 51.335537°N 12.37531°E
- Line: Leipzig City Tunnel
- Platforms: 2

Other information
- Station code: 8098
- DS100 code: LLWP
- Category: 5
- Fare zone: MDV: 110

History
- Opened: 15 December 2013; 12 years ago
- Electrified: at opening
Location
- Location within Saxony Location within Germany Location within Europe

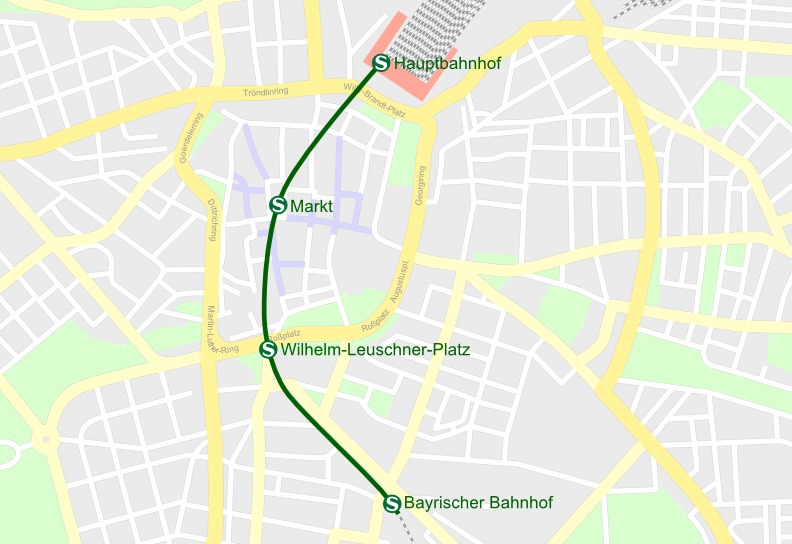
City Tunnel route

Leipzig Wilhelm-Leuschner-Platz is an underground railway station in the city of Leipzig, Germany. It was built as part of the Leipzig City Tunnel project and opened on 15 December 2013, enabling passengers to travel directly by rail from Leipzig Hauptbahnhof to the city centre.

== Train services ==
Leipzig Wilhelm-Leuschner-Platz station is served by seven of the ten S-Bahn Mitteldeutschland lines. Planners hope that the high frequency service and fast journey times will increase passenger capacity on the city's public transport and thus relieve road traffic in the city.

The following services currently call at the station:

Preceding station	Mitteldeutschland S-Bahn	Following station
Leipzig Markt towards Leipzig Miltitzer Allee	S 1	Leipzig Bayerischer Bahnhof towards Leipzig-Stötteritz
Leipzig Markt towards Dessau Hbf or Lutherstadt Wittenberg Hbf	S 2	Leipzig Bayerischer Bahnhof towards Leipzig-Stötteritz
Leipzig Markt towards Halle-Nietleben	S 3	Leipzig Bayerischer Bahnhof towards Wurzen or Oschatz
Leipzig Markt towards Falkenberg (Elster)	S 4	Leipzig Bayerischer Bahnhof towards Markkleeberg-Gaschwitz
Leipzig Markt towards Halle (Saale) Hbf	S 5	Leipzig Bayerischer Bahnhof towards Zwickau Hbf
Leipzig Markt towards Halle (Saale) Hbf	S 5x	Leipzig Bayerischer Bahnhof towards Zwickau Hbf
Leipzig Markt towards Leipzig Messe	S 6	Leipzig Bayerischer Bahnhof towards Geithain

== Tram services ==
- 2
- 8
- 9
- 10
- 11
- 14

== Design ==
Located 20 m (66 ft) underground, Leipzig Wilhelm-Leuschner-Platz station has a 140 m-long (460 ft) island platform. There are two entrances, north and south of the Martin Luther Ring-Road.
