= Leipzig Markt station =

Railway station in Leipzig, Germany

Leipzig Markt
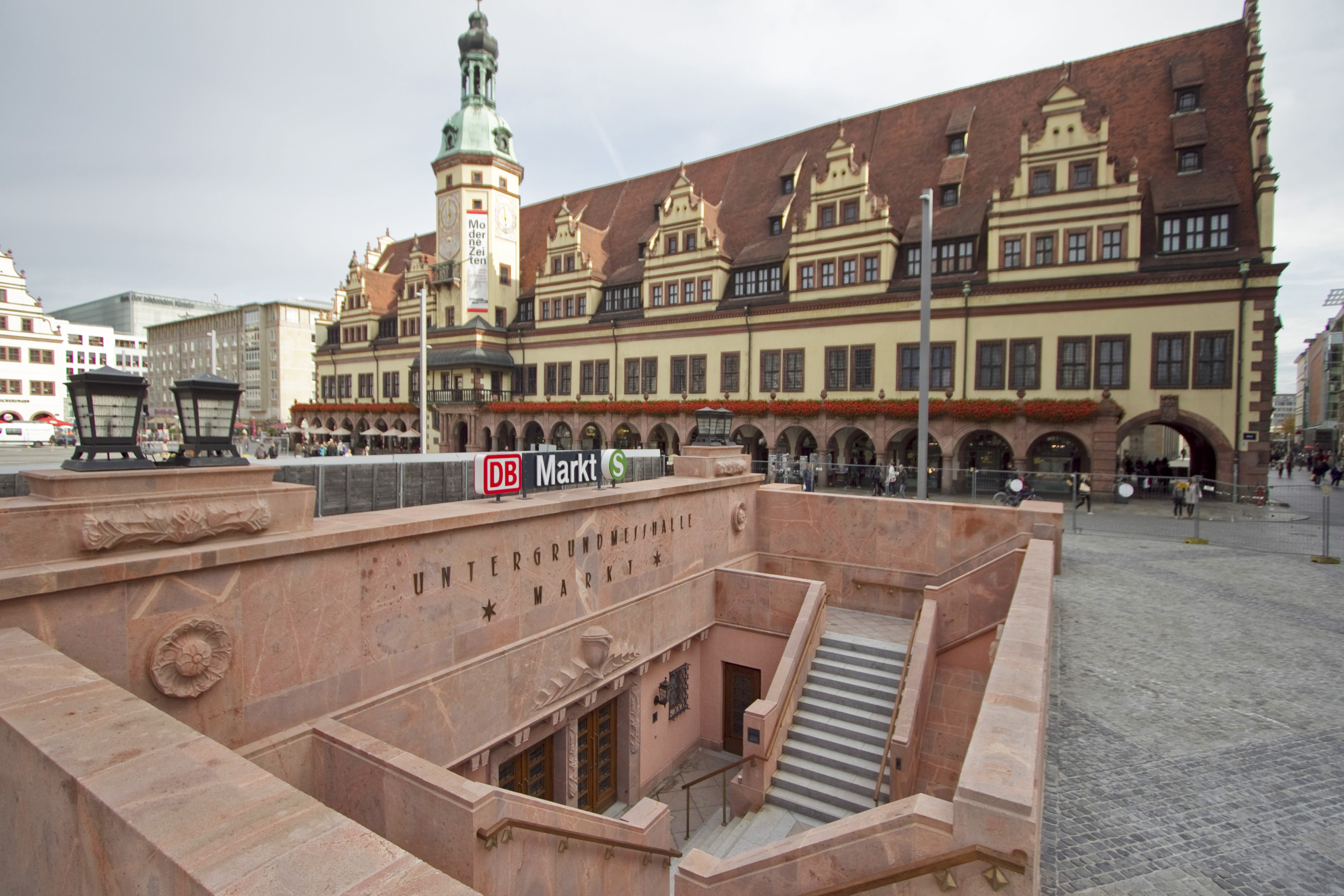

General information
- Location: Leipzig, Saxony; Germany
- Line: Leipzig City Tunnel

Other information
- Station code: 8097
- DS100 code: LLMK
- Category: 5
- Fare zone: MDV: 110

History
- Opened: 15 December 2013; 12 years ago
- Electrified: at opening
Location
- Location within Saxony Location within Germany Location within Europe

Leipzig Markt is a central railway station in the city of Leipzig, Germany. It was built as part of the Leipzig City Tunnel project and opened on 15 December 2013, enabling passengers to travel directly by rail from Leipzig Hauptbahnhof to the Markt square and the city centre.

== Train services ==
Leipzig Markt station is served by seven of the ten S-Bahn Mitteldeutschland lines. Planners hope that the high frequency service and fast journey times will increase passenger capacity on the city's public transport and thus relieve road traffic in the city.

Preceding station	Mitteldeutschland S-Bahn	Following station
Leipzig Hbf towards Leipzig Miltitzer Allee	S 1	Leipzig Wilhelm-Leuschner-Platz towards Leipzig-Stötteritz
Leipzig Hbf towards Dessau Hbf or Lutherstadt Wittenberg Hbf	S 2	Leipzig Wilhelm-Leuschner-Platz towards Leipzig-Stötteritz
Leipzig Hbf towards Halle-Nietleben	S 3	Leipzig Wilhelm-Leuschner-Platz towards Wurzen or Oschatz
Leipzig Hbf towards Falkenberg (Elster)	S 4	Leipzig Wilhelm-Leuschner-Platz towards Markkleeberg-Gaschwitz
Leipzig Hbf towards Halle (Saale) Hbf	S 5	Leipzig Wilhelm-Leuschner-Platz towards Zwickau Hbf
Leipzig Hbf towards Halle (Saale) Hbf	S 5x	Leipzig Wilhelm-Leuschner-Platz towards Zwickau Hbf
Leipzig Hbf towards Leipzig Messe	S 6	Leipzig Wilhelm-Leuschner-Platz towards Geithain

== Design ==
Located 22 m (72.2 ft) underground, Leipzig Markt station has a 140 m (459.3 ft) long island platform. There are two entrances, in the north and south of the market square. The south entrance is the renovated Art Deco original entrance to a former underground exhibition hall dating from 1925. The side walls have a facade of terracotta slabs, while front and rear station walls and the service rooms on the platform have ceramic decoration.

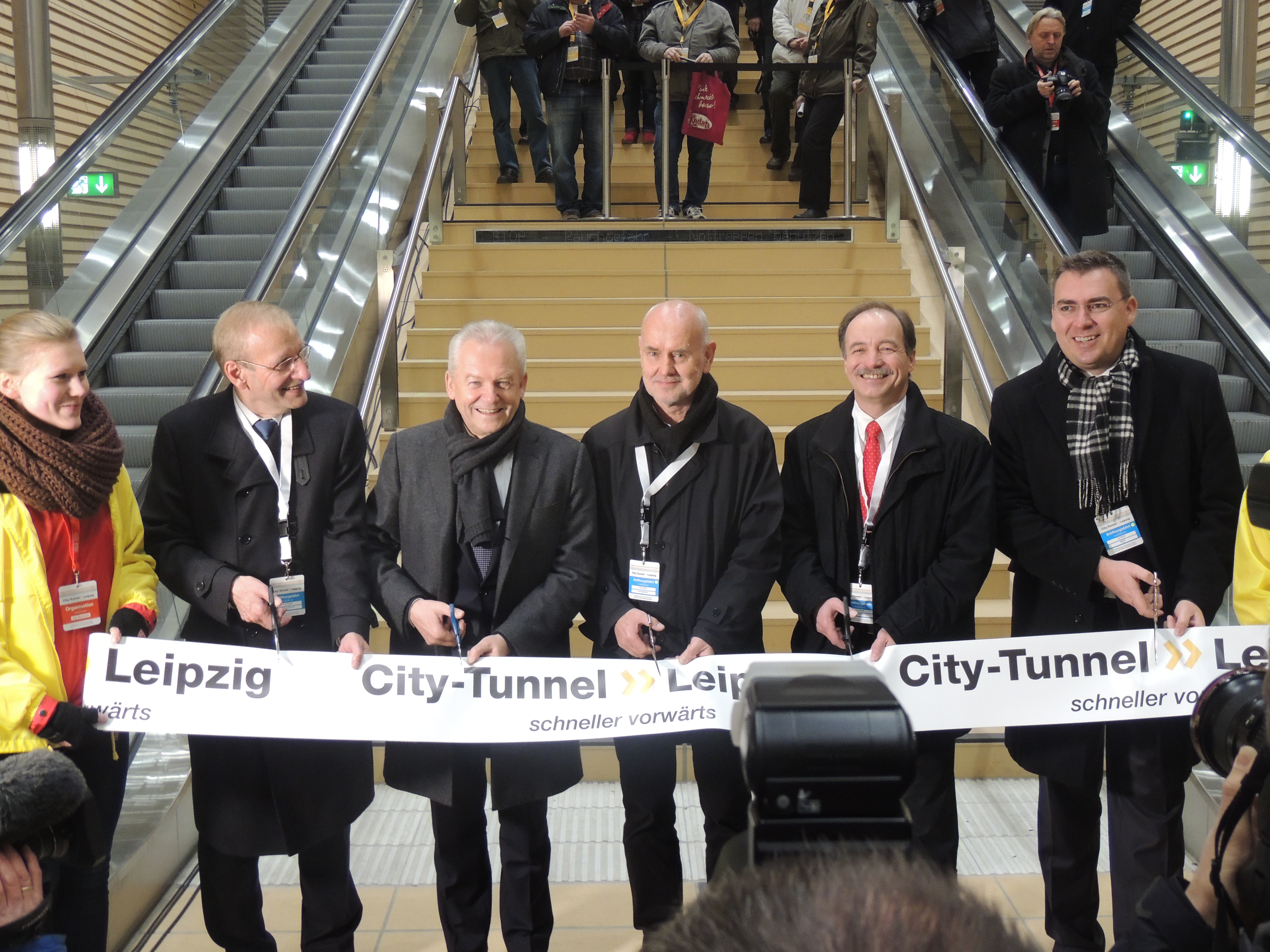
Opening in December 2013

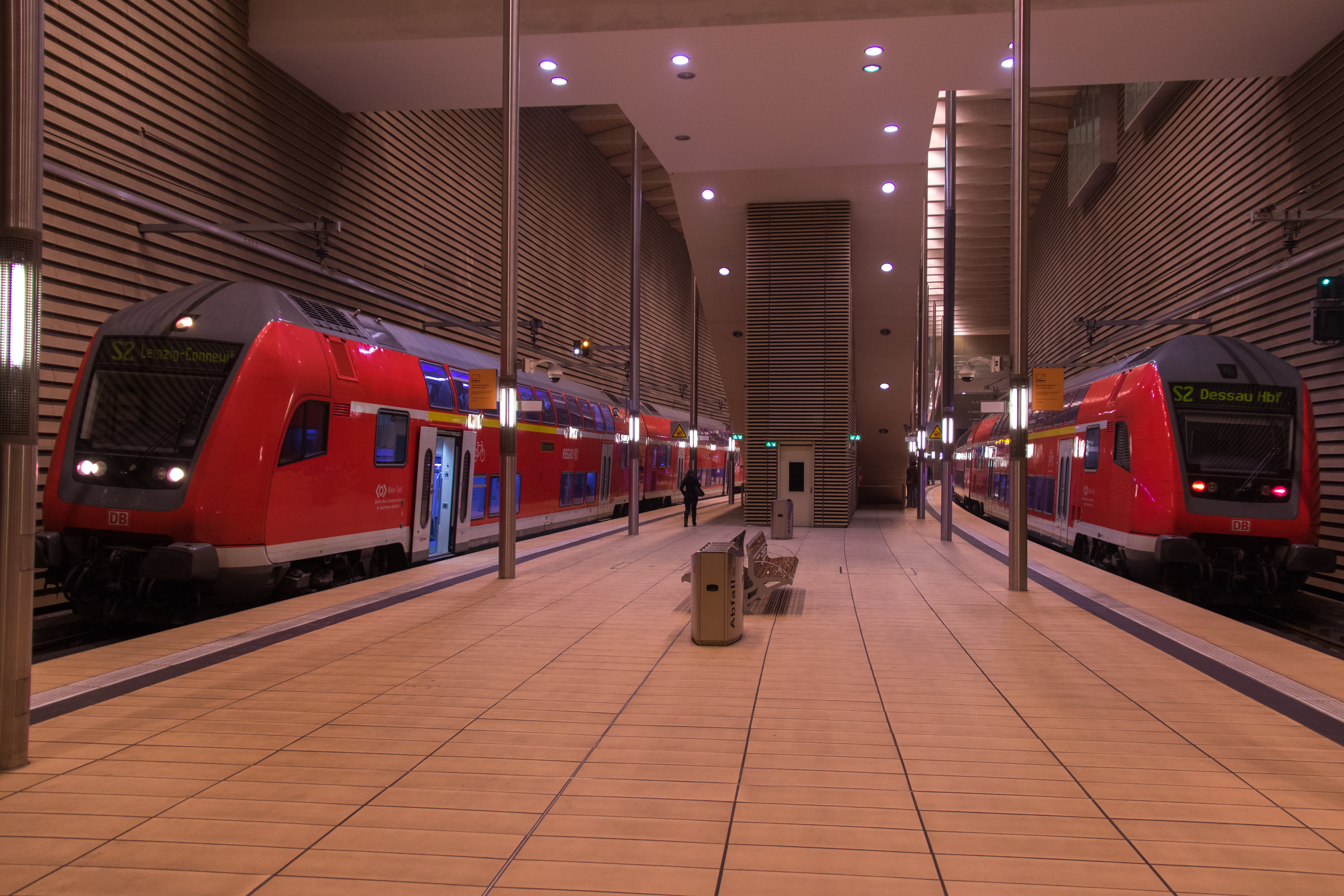
Inside Markt station

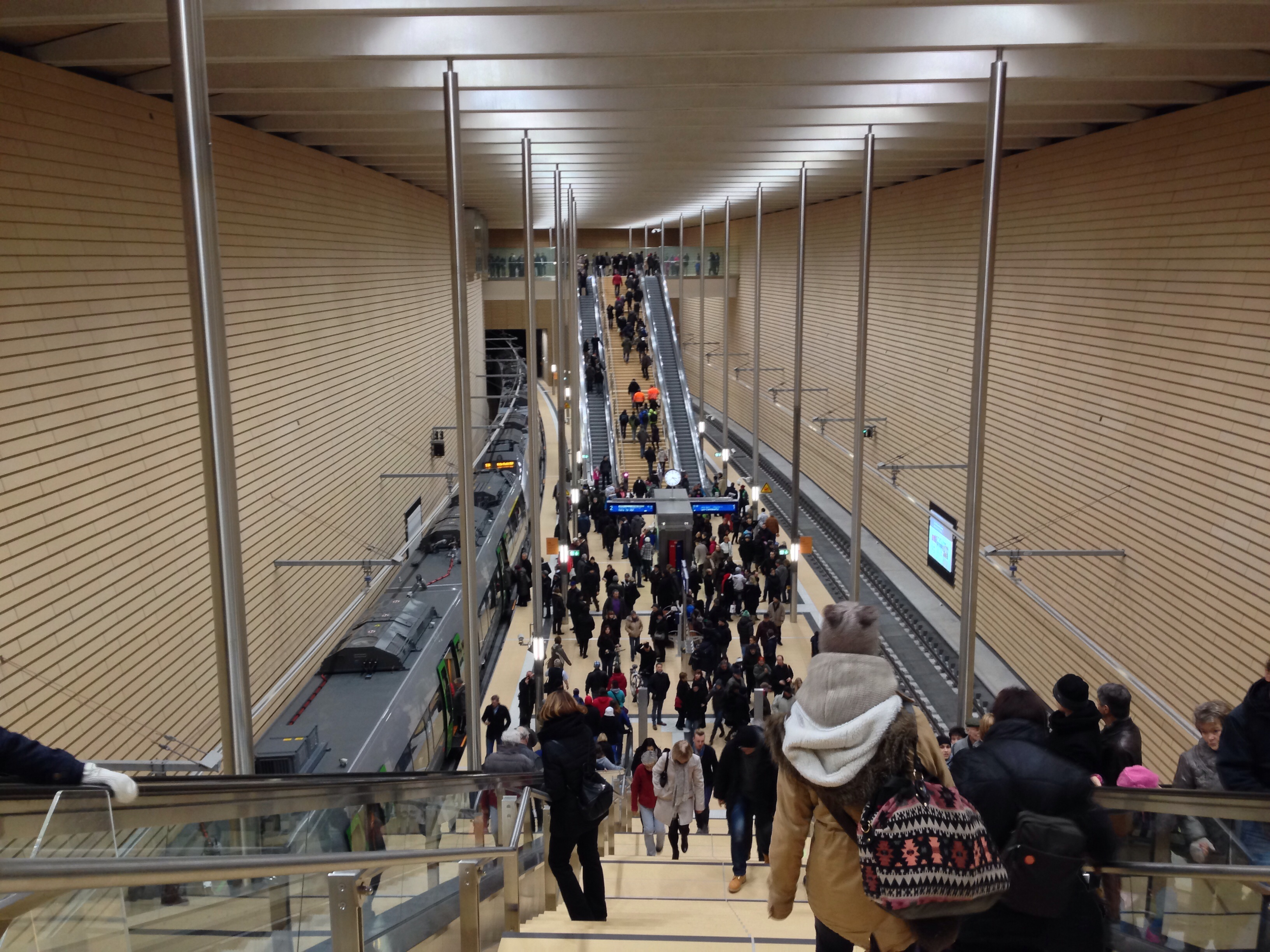
Markt station in the morning

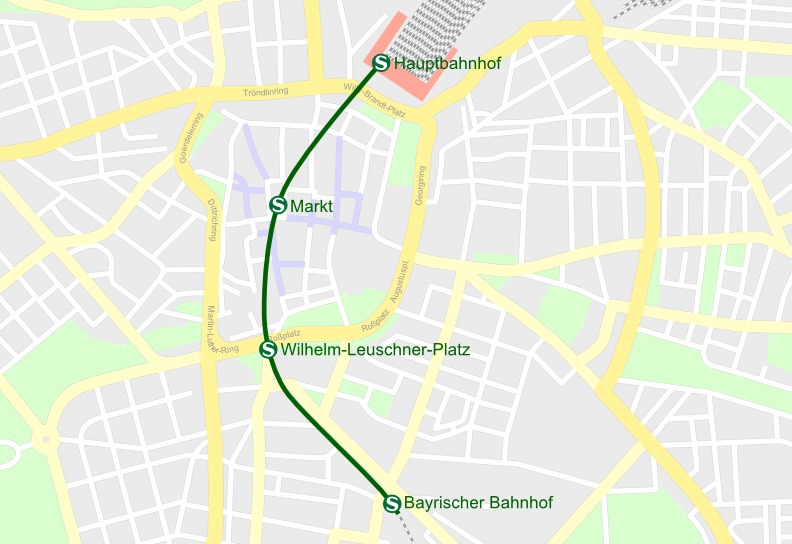
City Tunnel route
