= Leipzig-Connewitz station =

Railway station in Saxony, Germany

Leipzig Connewitz
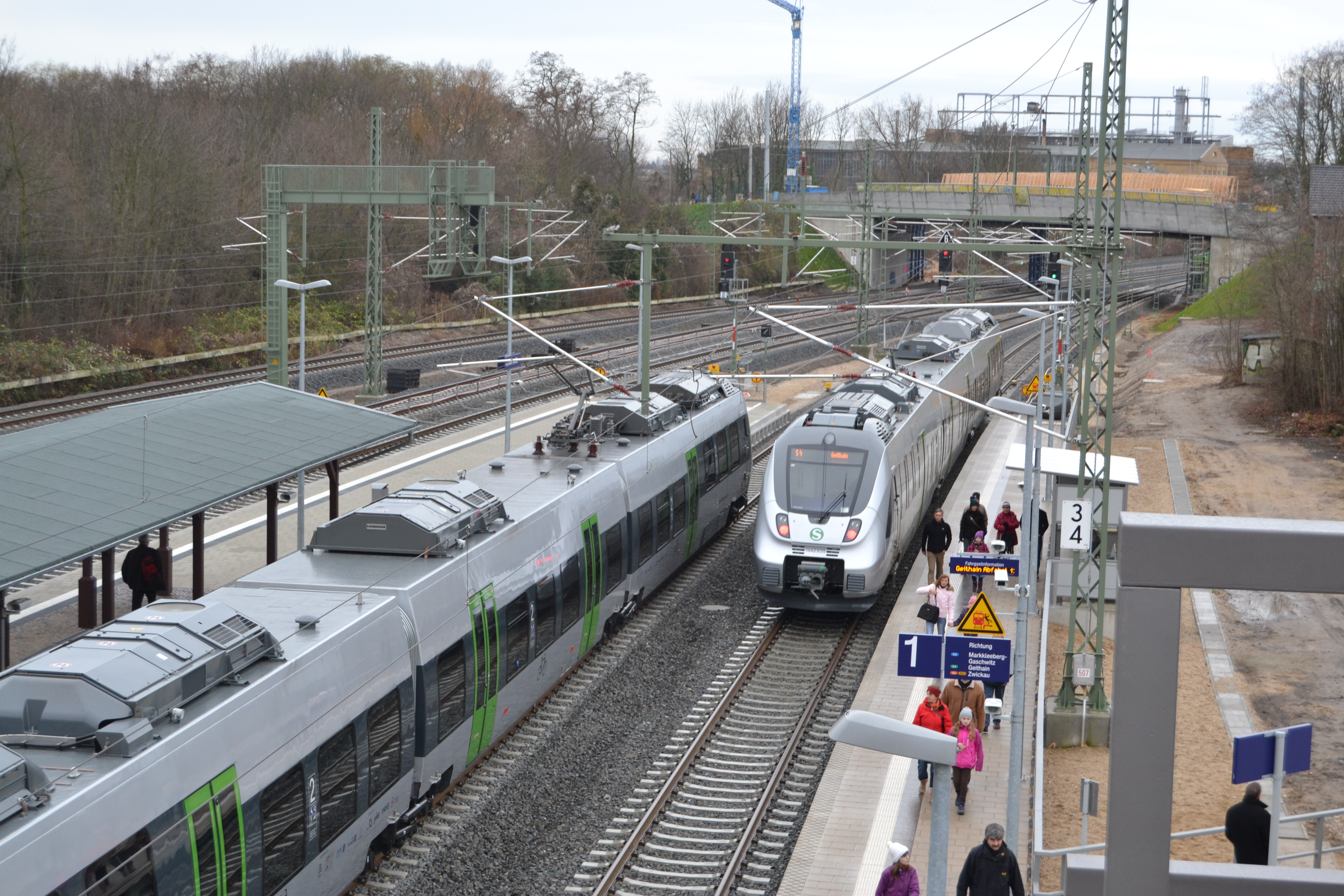
- Leipzig-Connewitz station, which was opened in December 2013, with trains of S-Bahn Mitteldeutschland

General information
- Location: Bornaische Str. 95a, Leipzig, Saxony; Germany
- Coordinates: 51°18′01″N 12°23′09″E
- Lines: Leipzig–Hof; Hauptbahnhof–Connewitz; Engelsdorf–Connewitz (out of service); Leipzig-Connewitz–Plagwitz (out of service)
- Platforms: 2
- Tracks: 3

Construction
- Accessible: Yes

Other information
- Station code: 3636
- DS100 code: LLC
- IBNR: 8010206
- Category: 5
- Fare zone: MDV: 110
- Website: www.bahnhof.de

History
- Opened: 10 July 1889
Location
- Location within Saxony Location within Germany Location within Europe

Leipzig-Connewitz is a railway station in the city of Leipzig, Germany. The station is located on the Leipzig–Hof railway and Leipzig Hbf–Leipzig-Connewitz railway. Since December 2013 the station is served by the S-Bahn Mitteldeutschland, a subsidiary of Deutsche Bahn.

== History ==
The station was opened on 10 July 1889 as Connewitz loading point (Ladestelle). The connection from Connewitz to Leipzig was opened in 1891. The station was opened on 1 November 1893 as a halt (Haltestelle) and renamed Leipzig-Connewitz in 1897. The halt was reclassified as a station in 1905.

The station is a railway junction in southern Leipzig. Between 1888 and 1925, the Leipzig-Connewitz–Plagwitz railway connected the industrial area of Plagwitz to the Saxon State Railways network. Between 1876 and 2012, the Leipzig Hbf–Leipzig-Connewitz railway (known as the Zweite Verbindungsbahn—"second connecting railway") ran from Leipzig Hauptbahnhof (called Leipzig-Dresdener Bahnhof until 1915). The section of the Leipzig-Engelsdorf–Leipzig-Connewitz railway (which was opened in 1906) between the former Tabakmühle junction and Leipzig-Connewitz was closed in 2012 and dismantled with the opening of the S-Bahn Mitteldeutschland in 2013. Leipzig-Connewitz was the starting point of the Leipzig–Hof line during the reconstruction of the line to connect with the new City Tunnel. The remaining part of the Leipzig Hbf–Leipzig-Connewitz route from Stötteritz runs past the station. The S-Bahn trains run between Connewitz and Gaschwitz over the suburban tracks, line number 6377. There are platforms exits only on the suburban tracks, which were built on the former long-distance tracks and opened in 2013.

== Train services ==
The following services currently call at the station:

Preceding station	Mitteldeutschland S-Bahn	Following station
Leipzig MDR towards Falkenberg (Elster)	S 4	Markkleeberg Nord towards Markkleeberg-Gaschwitz
Leipzig MDR towards Halle (Saale) Hbf	S 5	Markkleeberg Nord towards Zwickau Hbf
Leipzig MDR towards Halle (Saale) Hbf	S 5x	Markkleeberg Nord towards Zwickau Hbf
Leipzig MDR towards Leipzig Messe	S 6	Markkleeberg Nord towards Geithain
