= Markkleeberg station =

Railway station in Markkleeberg, Germany

Markkleeberg
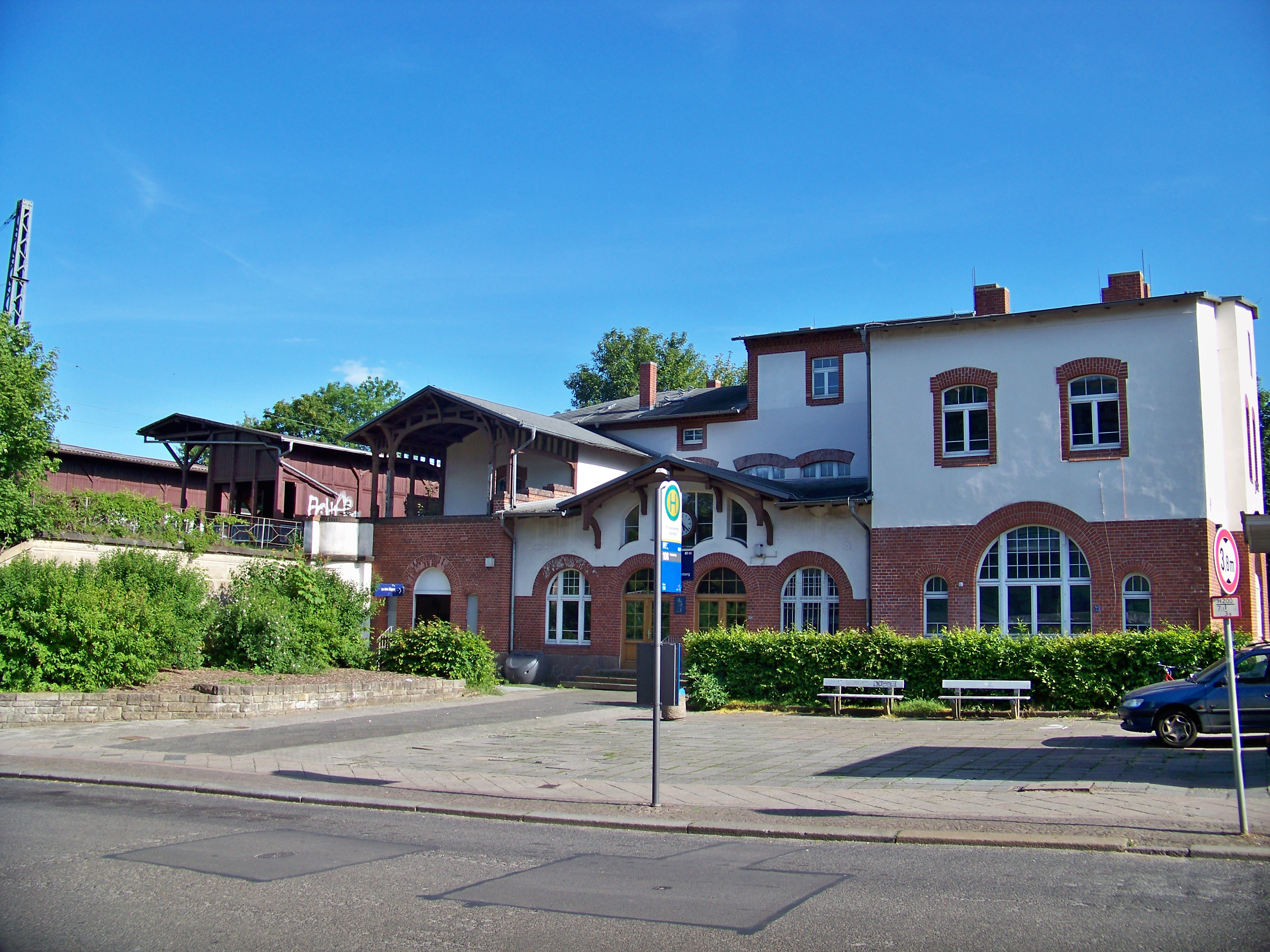
- Markkleeberg station

General information
- Location: Rathausstr. 29, Markkleeberg, Saxony; Germany
- Coordinates: 51°16′45″N 12°22′21″E
- Line: Leipzig–Hof railway
- Platforms: 2

Construction
- Accessible: Yes

Other information
- Station code: 3961
- DS100 code: LMA
- IBNR: 8012308
- Category: 5
- Fare zone: MDV: 151
- Website: www.bahnhof.de

History
- Opened: 1 July 1889
Location
- Location within Saxony Location within Germany Location within Europe

Markkleeberg is a railway station in Markkleeberg, Saxony, Germany. The station is located on the Leipzig–Hof railway. The train services are operated by Deutsche Bahn. Since December 2013 the station is served by the S-Bahn Mitteldeutschland.

== History ==
The station was opened on 1 July 1889 under the name of Oetzsch. It has had the following names:

- until 1905: Oetzsch
- until 1924: Ötzsch
- until 1934: Oetzsch
- since 1934: Markkleeberg

After Oetzsch and Markkleeberg had united to form Oetzsch-Markkleeberg in 1915, the station retained the name of Oetzsch. It was only with the formation of the new town of Markkleeberg that it was renamed to Markkleeberg. In 1969, the station was integrated in the Leipzig S-Bahn network, which since 2013 has formed part of the S-Bahn Mitteldeutschland. Since 2013, there have been no platforms on the main line.

== Train services ==
The following services currently call at the station:

Preceding station	Mitteldeutschland S-Bahn	Following station
Markkleeberg Nord towards Falkenberg (Elster)	S 4	Markkleeberg-Großstädteln towards Markkleeberg-Gaschwitz
Markkleeberg Nord towards Halle (Saale) Hbf	S 5	Böhlen (Leipzig) towards Zwickau Hbf
Markkleeberg Nord towards Halle (Saale) Hbf	S 5x	Böhlen (Leipzig) towards Zwickau Hbf
Markkleeberg Nord towards Leipzig Messe	S 6	Markkleeberg-Großstädteln towards Geithain
