= Leipzig Bayerischer Bahnhof =

Railway station in Leipzig, Germany

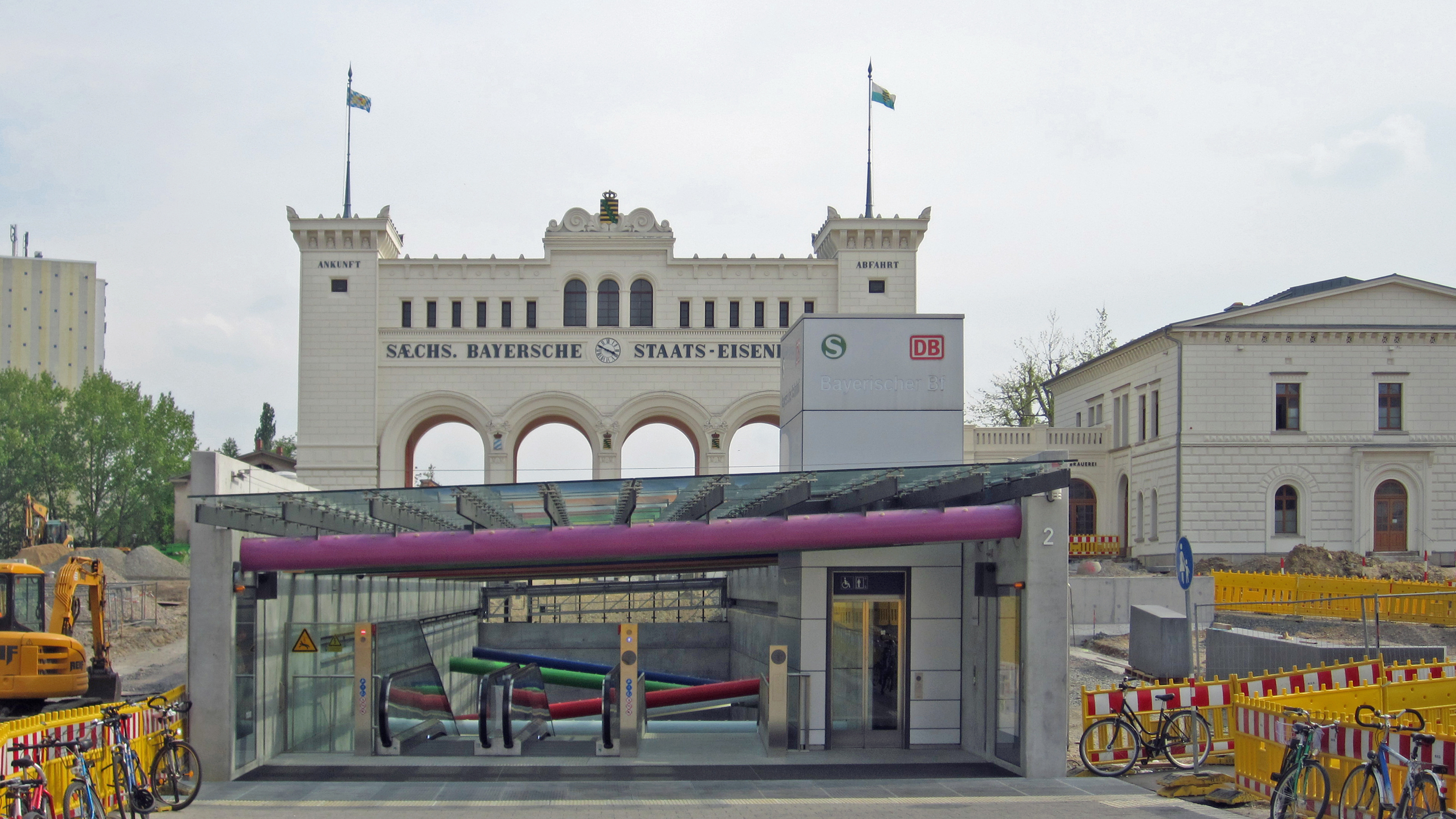
- Leipzig Bayerischer Bahnhof

General information
- Location: Leipzig, Saxony; Germany
- Coordinates: 51°19′45″N 12°22′54″E
- System: Bf
- Lines: Leipzig City Tunnel; Leipzig–Hof railway
- Platforms: 2

Other information
- Station code: 8099
- DS100 code: LLB
- Category: 5
- Fare zone: MDV: 110

History
- Opened: 19 September 1842; 15 December 2013; 12 years ago
- Closed: 10 June 2001
- Electrified: 2 October 1961; 64 years ago
Location
- Location within Saxony Location within Germany Location within Europe

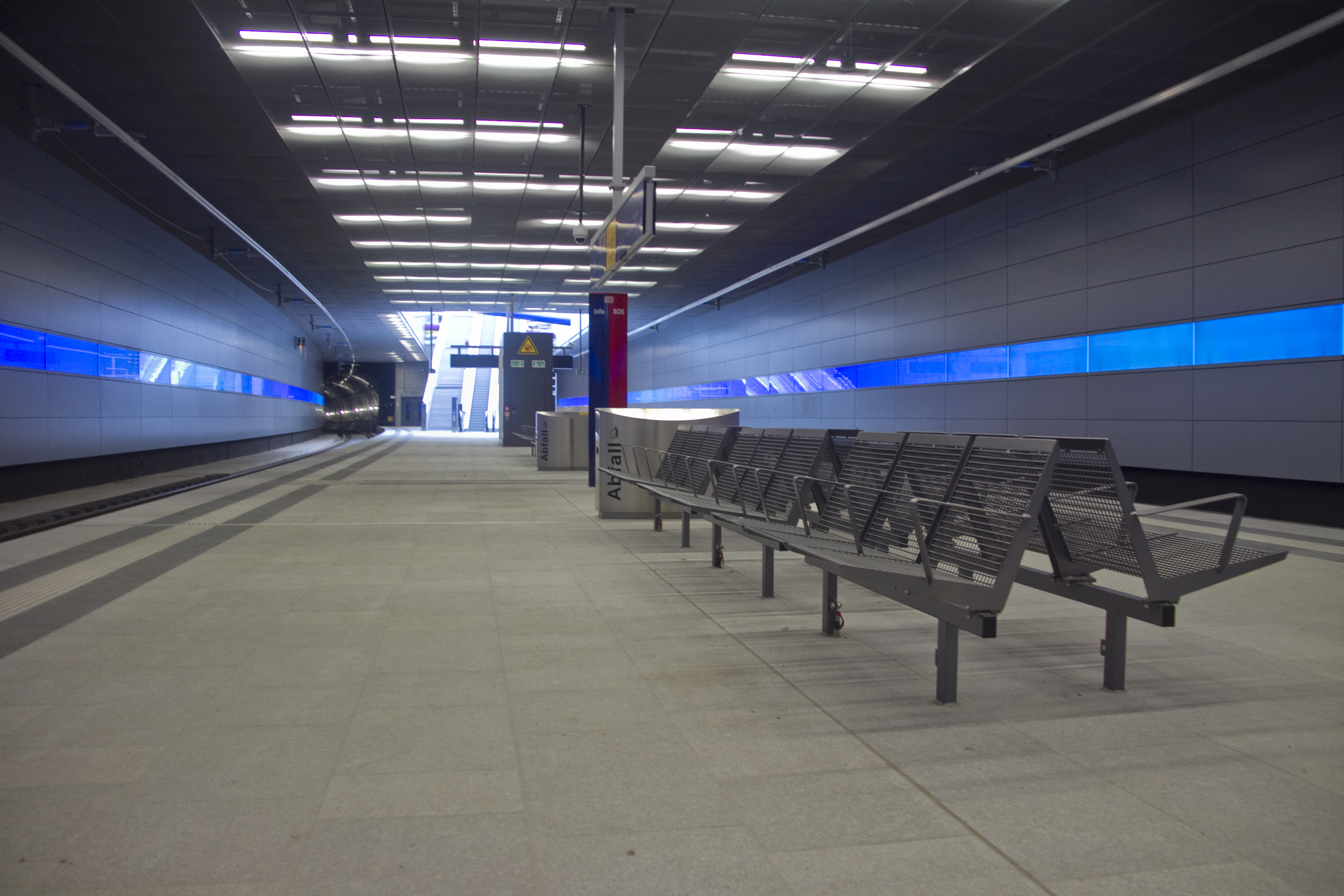
The new underground platforms

Leipzig Bayerischer Bahnhof (Leipzig Bavarian station) is Germany's oldest preserved railway station, located in Leipzig, Germany, in the southeastern part of the district Mitte. The station was first opened in 1842 for the Leipzig–Hof railway by the Saxon-Bavarian Railway Company (German: Sächsisch-Baiersche Eisenbahn-Compagnie), later taken over by the Royal Saxon State Railways (Königlich Sächsische Staatseisenbahnen) and operated as the Saxon-Bavarian State Railways (Sächsisch-Bayerische Staatseisenbahn).

The station was closed in 2001 for the construction of the Leipzig City Tunnel. It re-opened on 15 December 2013 after the completion of the tunnel. Since then it has been integrated into S-Bahn Mitteldeutschland system. The new station is built directly underneath the site of the former station.

The buildings on the west side of the station were renovated in 1999 and are now used by the Bayerischer Bahnhof Gose Brewery and Gasthaus.

== Train services ==
Leipzig Bayerischer Bahnhof station is served by seven of the ten S-Bahn Mitteldeutschland lines. Planners hope that the high frequency service and fast journey times will increase passenger capacity on the city's public transport and thus relieve road traffic in the city.

The following services currently call at the station:

Preceding station	Mitteldeutschland S-Bahn	Following station
Leipzig Wilhelm-Leuschner-Platz towards Leipzig Miltitzer Allee	S 1	Leipzig MDR towards Leipzig-Stötteritz
Leipzig Wilhelm-Leuschner-Platz towards Dessau Hbf or Lutherstadt Wittenberg Hbf	S 2	Leipzig MDR towards Leipzig-Stötteritz
Leipzig Wilhelm-Leuschner-Platz towards Halle-Nietleben	S 3	Leipzig MDR towards Wurzen or Oschatz
Leipzig Wilhelm-Leuschner-Platz towards Falkenberg (Elster)	S 4	Leipzig MDR towards Markkleeberg-Gaschwitz
Leipzig Wilhelm-Leuschner-Platz towards Halle (Saale) Hbf	S 5	Leipzig MDR towards Zwickau Hbf
Leipzig Wilhelm-Leuschner-Platz towards Halle (Saale) Hbf	S 5x	Leipzig MDR towards Zwickau Hbf
Leipzig Wilhelm-Leuschner-Platz towards Leipzig Messe	S 6	Leipzig MDR towards Geithain

== See also ==
- Architecture of Leipzig - Neoclassicism
