= Markkleeberg Nord station =

Railway station in Markkleeberg, Germany

Markkleeberg Nord
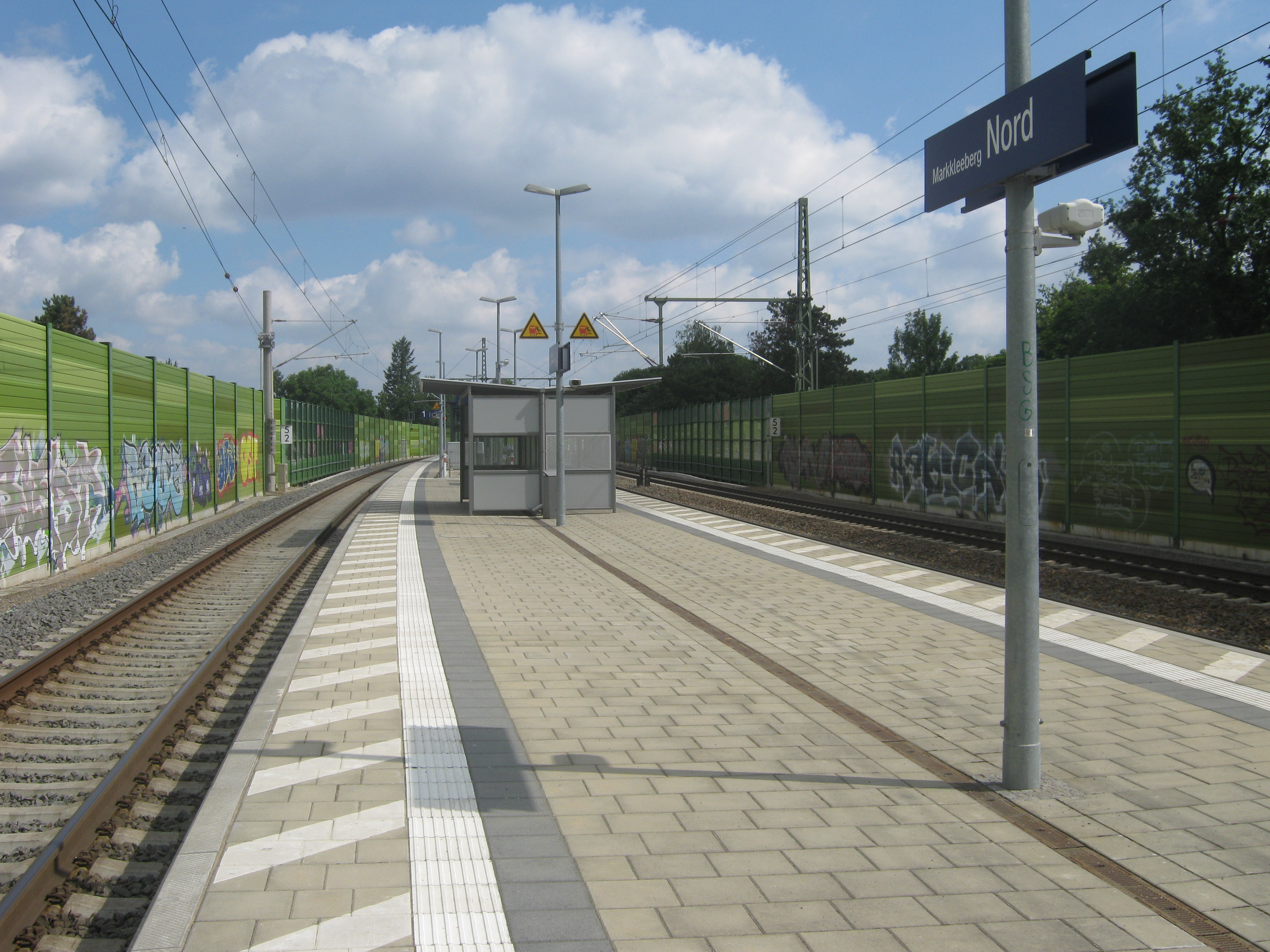
- Markkleeberg Nord railway station

General information
- Location: Breitscheidstr. 1, Markkleeberg, Saxony; Germany
- Coordinates: 51°17′17″N 12°22′20″E
- System: Hp
- Line: Leipzig–Hof railway
- Platforms: 2

Construction
- Accessible: Yes

Other information
- Station code: 8297
- DS100 code: LMAN
- IBNR: 8012304
- Category: 6
- Fare zone: MDV: 625 (Note: Both zones 110 and 151.)
- Website: www.bahnhof.de

History
- Opened: 15 December 2013; 12 years ago
- Electrified: at opening
Location
- Location within Saxony Location within Germany Location within Europe

Markkleeberg Nord is a railway station in Markkleeberg, Saxony, Germany. The station is located on the Leipzig–Hof railway. The train services are operated by Deutsche Bahn. The station was opened with the commissioning of the S-Bahn Mitteldeutschland on 15 December 2013. It is located on the suburban tracks, line number 6377, and because of the space needed for the platform, the main line between Leipzig-Connewitz and Gaschwitz has been reduced to one track since 2013.

== Train services ==
The following services currently call at the station:

Preceding station	Mitteldeutschland S-Bahn	Following station
Leipzig-Connewitz towards Falkenberg (Elster)	S 4	Markkleeberg towards Markkleeberg-Gaschwitz
Leipzig-Connewitz towards Halle (Saale) Hbf	S 5	Markkleeberg towards Zwickau Hbf
Leipzig-Connewitz towards Halle (Saale) Hbf	S 5x	Markkleeberg towards Zwickau Hbf
Leipzig-Connewitz towards Leipzig Messe	S 6	Markkleeberg towards Geithain
