= Leipzig MDR station =

Railway station in Leipzig, Germany

Leipzig MDR
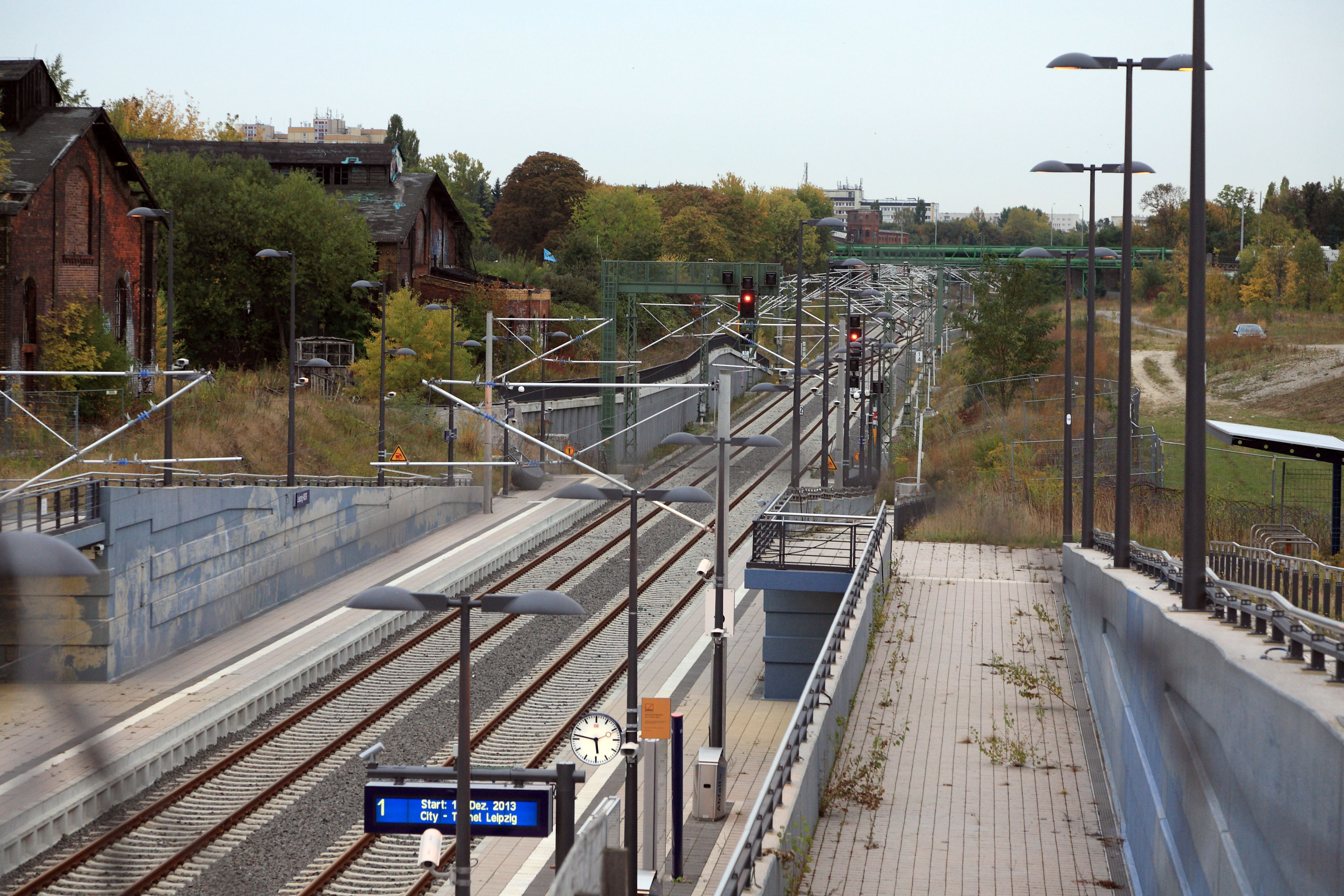
- Leipzig MDR railway station

General information
- Location: Semmelweisstraße 2, Leipzig, Saxony; Germany
- Coordinates: 51°19′12″N 12°23′11″E
- System: Hp
- Owner: DB Netz
- Operator: DB Station&Service
- Line: Leipzig City Tunnel
- Platforms: 2

Construction
- Accessible: Yes

Other information
- Station code: 8100
- DS100 code: LMDR
- IBNR: 8012187
- Category: 6
- Fare zone: MDV: 110
- Website: www.bahnhof.de

History
- Opened: 15 December 2013; 12 years ago
- Electrified: at opening
Location
- Location within Saxony Location within Germany Location within Europe

Leipzig MDR is a railway station in the city of Leipzig, Germany. It was built as part of the Leipzig City Tunnel project and opened on 15 December 2013, enabling passengers to travel directly by rail from Leipzig Hauptbahnhof through the city centre to destinations south of the city.

The station is in the cutting running from the southern ramp of the City Tunnel. Its planning name was Semmelweisstraße. It consists of two 140 metre-long side platforms that are located directly south of Semmelweisstraße, which crosses the railway tracks here; this street was recently built to connect Kurt-Eisner-Straße with Zwickauer Straße. Access to the platforms is by stairs and ramps.

MDR stands for Mitteldeutscher Rundfunk, a public broadcaster located near the station.

== Train services ==
Leipzig MDR station is served by seven of the ten S-Bahn Mitteldeutschland lines. Planners hope that the high frequency service and fast journey times will increase passenger capacity on the city's public transport and thus relieve road traffic in the city.

The following services currently call at the station:

Preceding station	Mitteldeutschland S-Bahn	Following station
Leipzig Bayerischer Bahnhof towards Leipzig Miltitzer Allee	S 1	Leipzig-Völkerschlachtdenkmal towards Leipzig-Stötteritz
Leipzig Bayerischer Bahnhof towards Dessau Hbf or Lutherstadt Wittenberg Hbf	S 2	Leipzig-Völkerschlachtdenkmal towards Leipzig-Stötteritz
Leipzig Bayerischer Bahnhof towards Halle-Nietleben	S 3	Leipzig-Völkerschlachtdenkmal towards Wurzen or Oschatz
Leipzig Bayerischer Bahnhof towards Falkenberg (Elster)	S 4	Leipzig-Connewitz towards Markkleeberg-Gaschwitz
Leipzig Bayerischer Bahnhof towards Halle (Saale) Hbf	S 5	Leipzig-Connewitz towards Zwickau Hbf
Leipzig Bayerischer Bahnhof towards Halle (Saale) Hbf	S 5x	Leipzig-Connewitz towards Zwickau Hbf
Leipzig Bayerischer Bahnhof towards Leipzig Messe	S 6	Leipzig-Connewitz towards Geithain
