= Markkleeberg-Großstädteln station =

Railway station in Markkleeberg, Germany

Markkleeberg Großstädteln
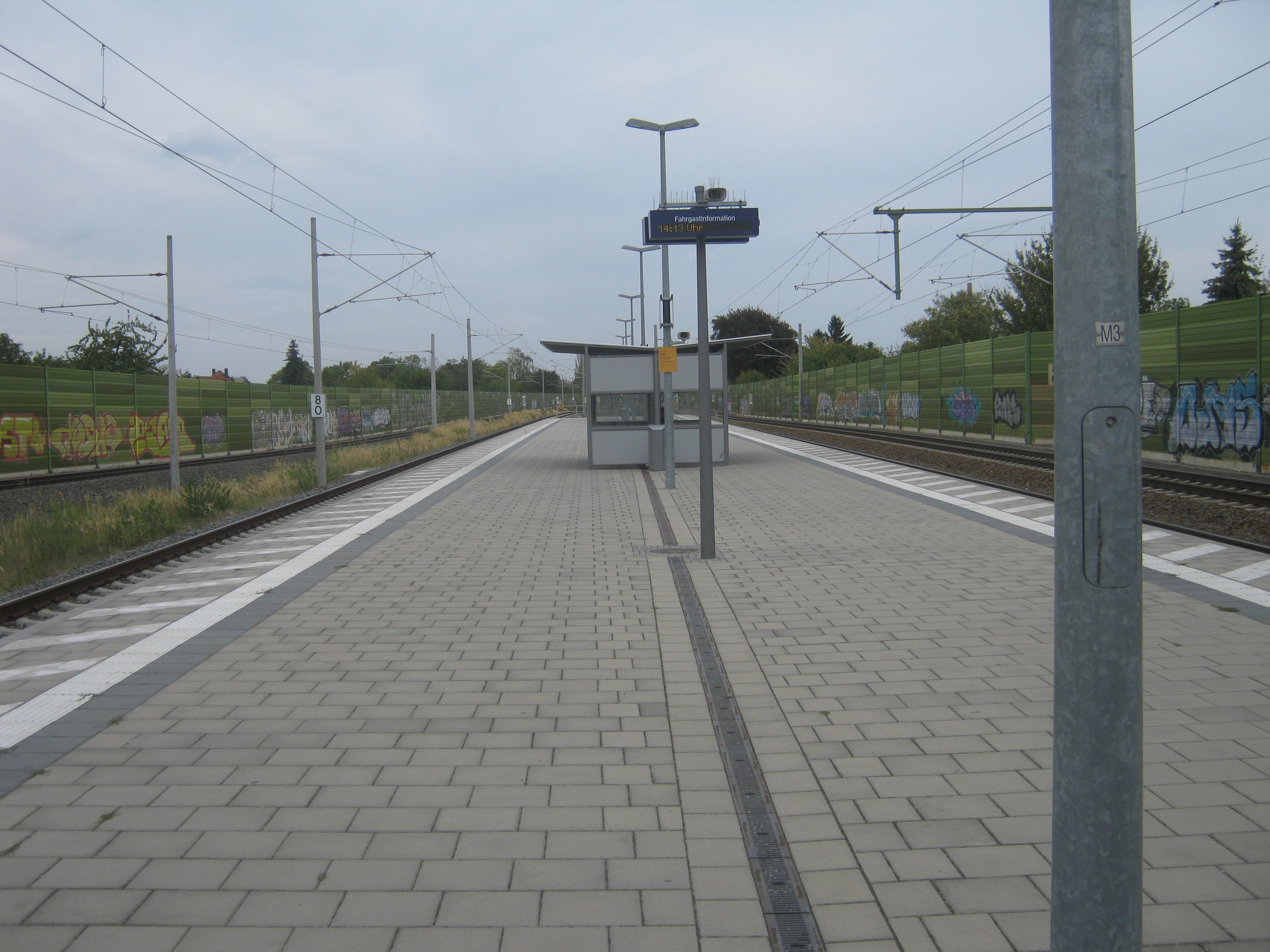
- Markkleeberg-Großstädteln railway station after reconstruction in 2012/2013

General information
- Location: Am Bahnhof 1, Markkleeberg, Saxony; Germany
- Coordinates: 51°15′45″N 12°22′34″E
- Lines: Leipzig–Hof; Leipzig–Markkleeberg (until 2012)
- Platforms: 2

Construction
- Accessible: No

Other information
- Station code: 3964
- DS100 code: LMAG
- IBNR: 8010228
- Category: 6
- Fare zone: MDV: 151
- Website: www.bahnhof.de

History
- Opened: 1 November 1907
Location
- Location within Saxony Location within Germany Location within Europe

Markkleeberg-Großstädteln is a railway station in Markkleeberg, Germany. The station is located on the Leipzig–Hof railway. The train services are operated by Deutsche Bahn. Since 15 December 2013 the station is served by the S-Bahn Mitteldeutschland.

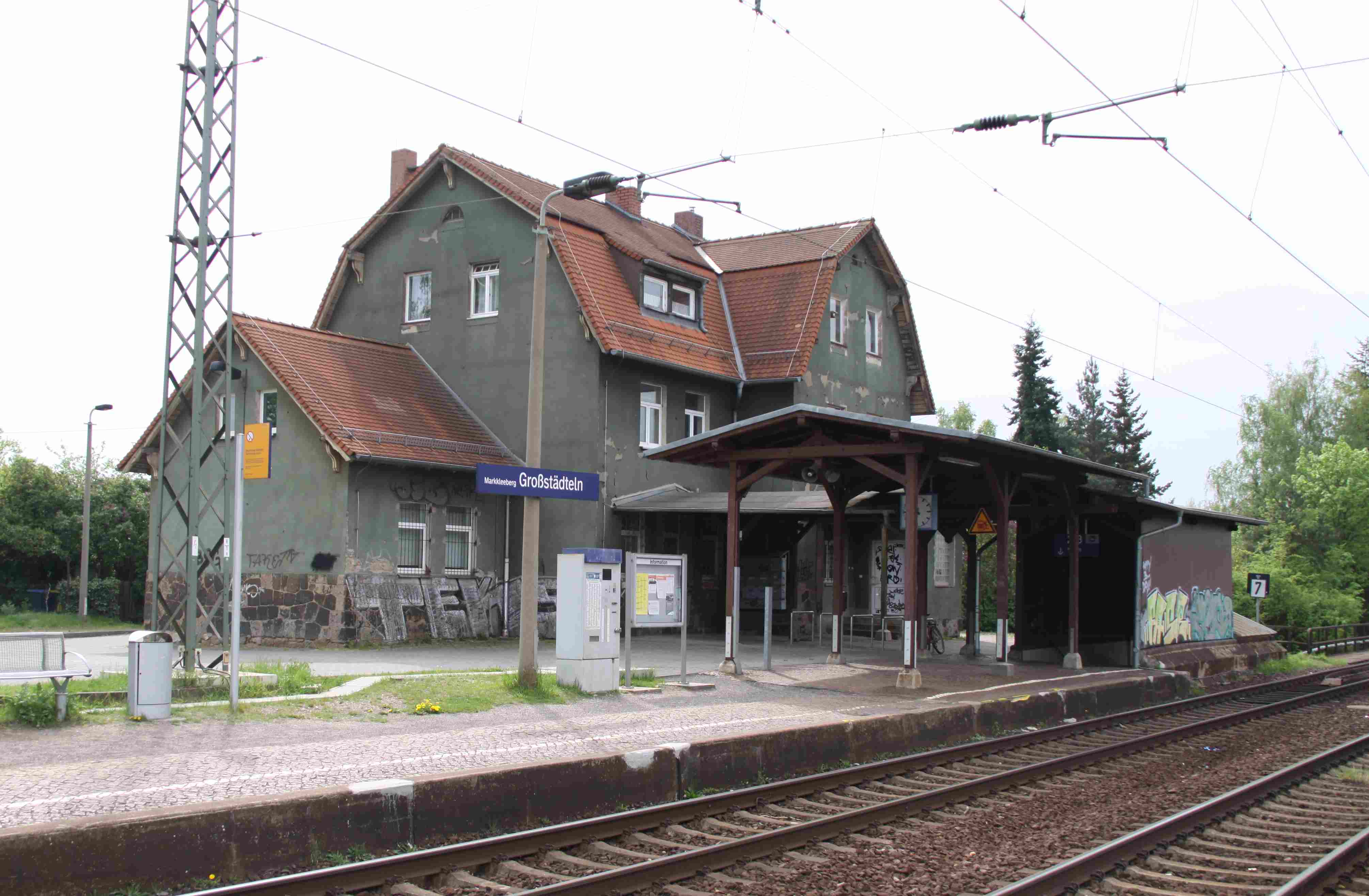
Markkleeberg-Großstädteln railway station before reconstruction in 2012–13

The station was opened on 1 November 1907 as Großstädteln. With the integration of Großstädteln into the municipality of Markkleeberg on 1 November 1937, it was renamed Markkleeberg-Großstädteln. From 1879 to the cessation of passenger traffic in 2002, Großstädteln was also a stop on the Leipzig-Plagwitz–Markkleeberg-Gaschwitz railway. It is served by lines S3 and S6.

== Train services ==
The following services currently call at the station:

Preceding station	Mitteldeutschland S-Bahn	Following station
Markkleeberg towards Falkenberg (Elster)	S 4	Markkleeberg-Gaschwitz Terminus
Markkleeberg towards Leipzig Messe	S 6	Markkleeberg-Gaschwitz towards Geithain
