= Leipzig City Tunnel =

Railway tunnel in Leipzig, Germany

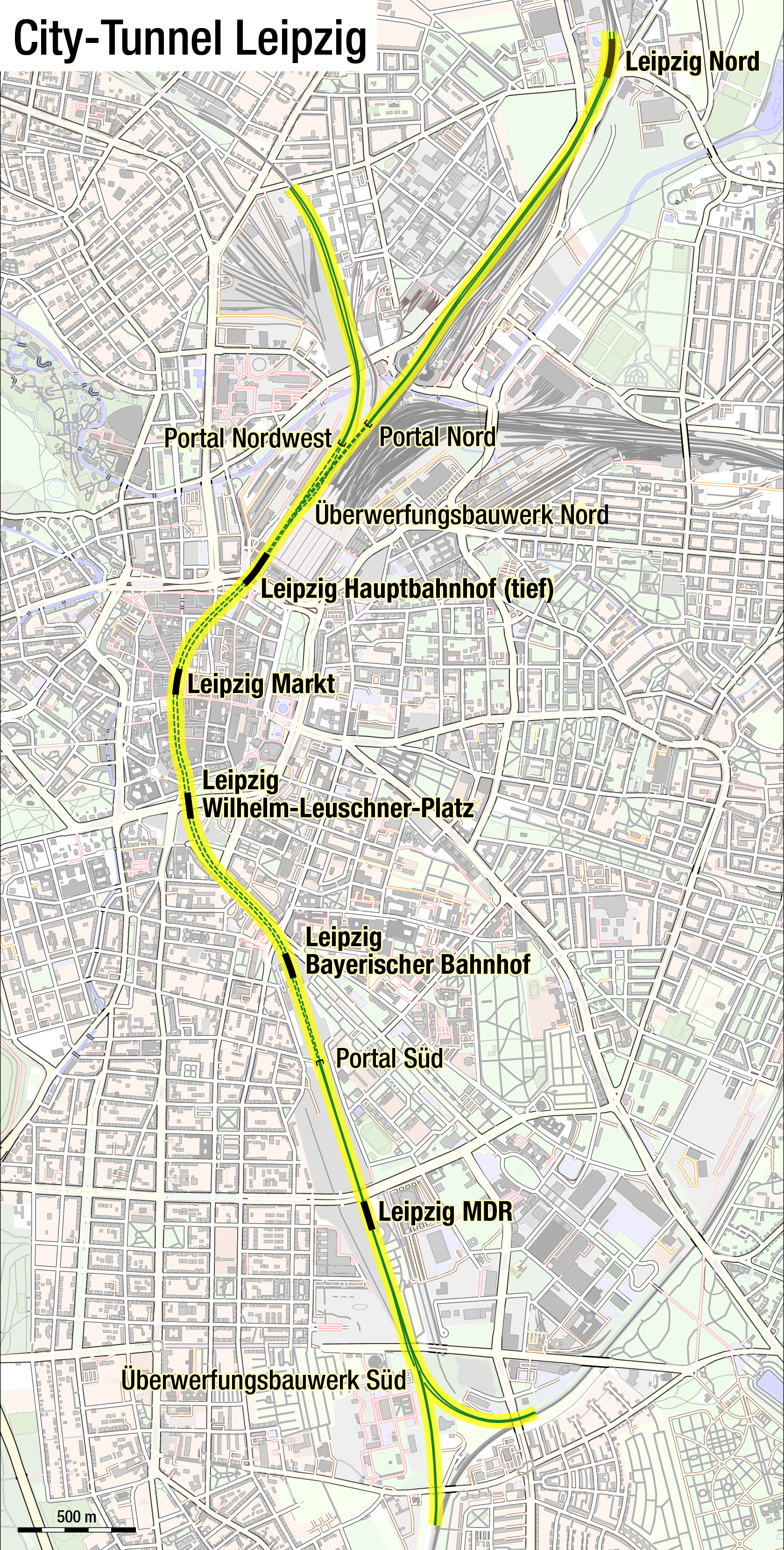
- Tunnel route, including adjacent ground-level tracks
- Interactive map of Leipzig City Tunnel

Overview
- Line: Railway line from Leipzig Hbf to Leipzig Bayerischer Bf
- Location: Leipzig
- Coordinates: Northern Portal: 51°20′44″N 12°22′51″E; Southern Portal: 51°19′40″N 12°22′56″E

Operation
- Work began: 2003
- Opened: 15 December 2013
- Operator: DB Netz

Technical
- Length: 3,609 m (11,841 ft)
- No. of tracks: double throughout
- Track gauge: 1435 mm
- Electrified: 15 kV 16.7 Hz

The City Tunnel is a twin-bore railway tunnel for the city-centre S-Bahn in Leipzig. It links Leipzig Hauptbahnhof with the central Markt station, Wilhelm-Leuschner-Platz station and Bayerischer Bahnhof.

Construction began in July 2003. The first bore was structurally completed in March 2008, the second in October 2008. The tunnel and new tracks linking it with the rest of the network were opened for commercial service on 15 December 2013, the date of the timetable change in December 2013.

== Route ==
From South to North

- Leipzig MDR (originally Leipzig Semmelweißstraße, outside the tunnel)
- Leipzig Bayerischer Bahnhof (platform length of 140 m)
- Leipzig Wilhelm-Leuschner-Platz (platform length of 140 m)
- Leipzig Markt (platform length of 140 m)
- Leipzig Hauptbahnhof (platform length of 215 m. Option to extend in a northerly direction to a length of 400 m); 800 m long ramps
- Leipzig Nord (originally Leipzig Theresienstraße, outside the tunnel)

In addition to the four underground stations of the City Tunnel, the shells of the new stations Leipzig MDR and Leipzig Nord - Berliner Brücke were completed in January 2011.

The northern ramp to the entrance of the tunnel is 600 m long and has a slope of 40 ‰

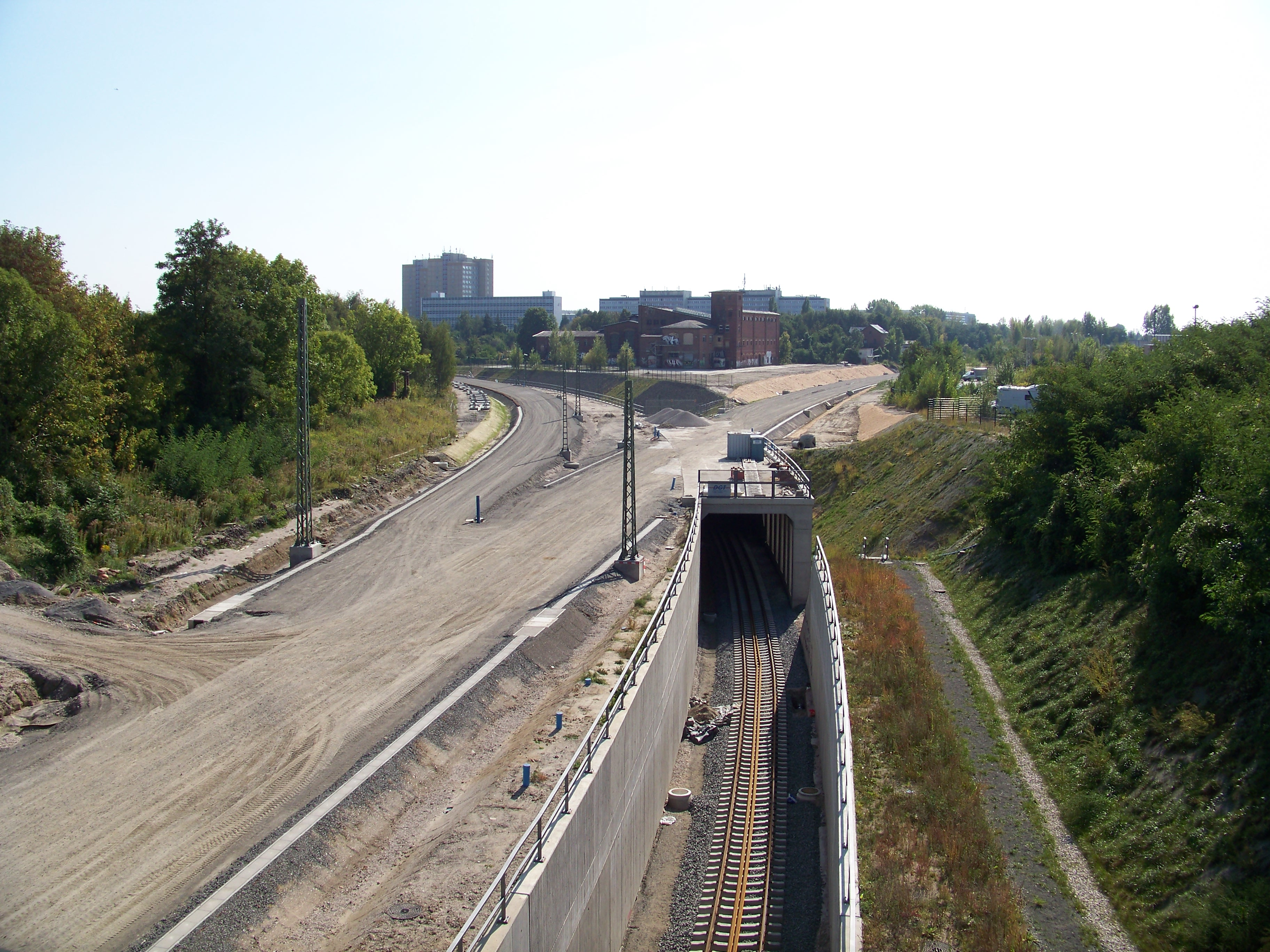
A flying junction located south of the tunnel separates tracks to the south from those to the east (construction phase, 2009).

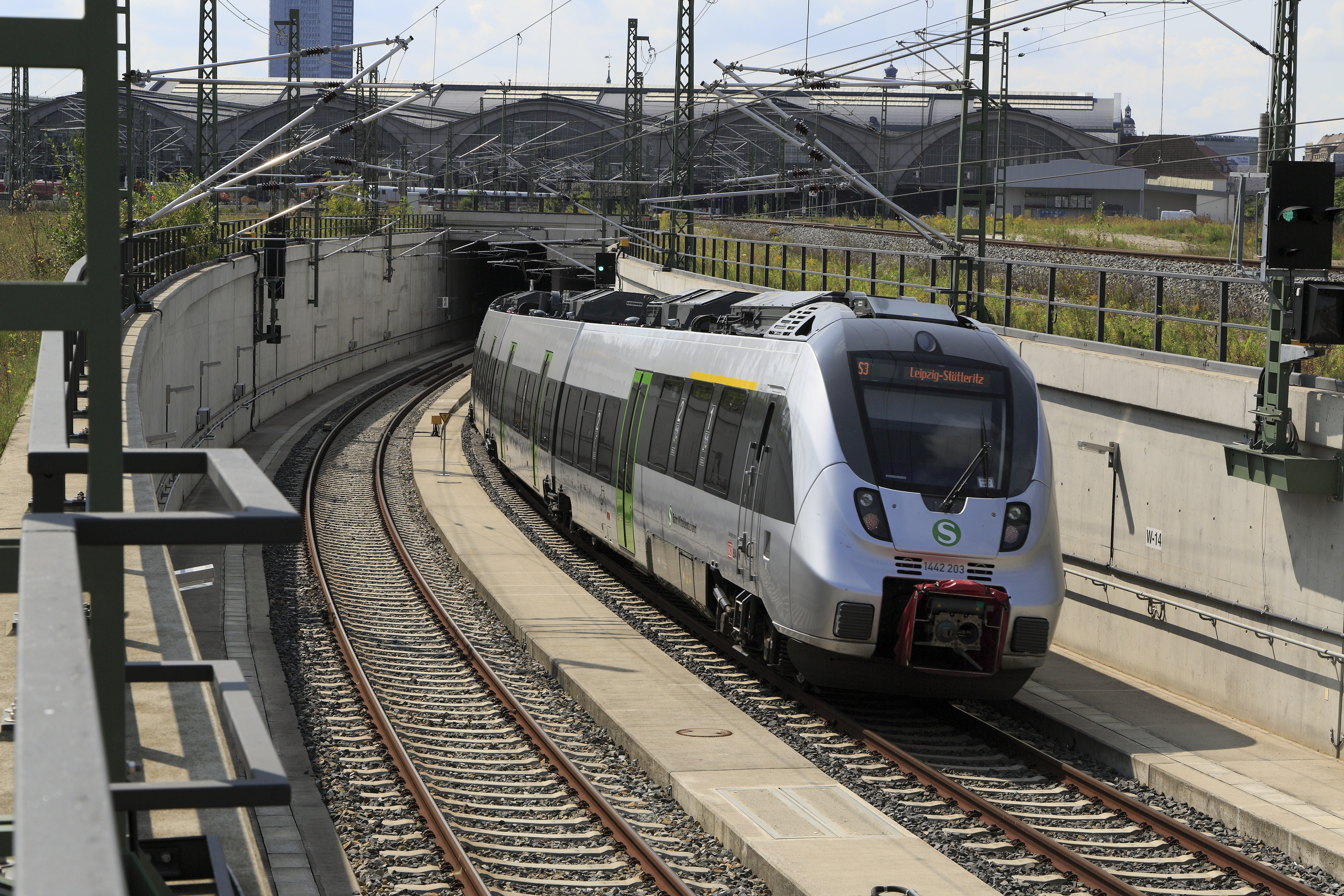
North ramp at Leipzig Hauptbahnhof

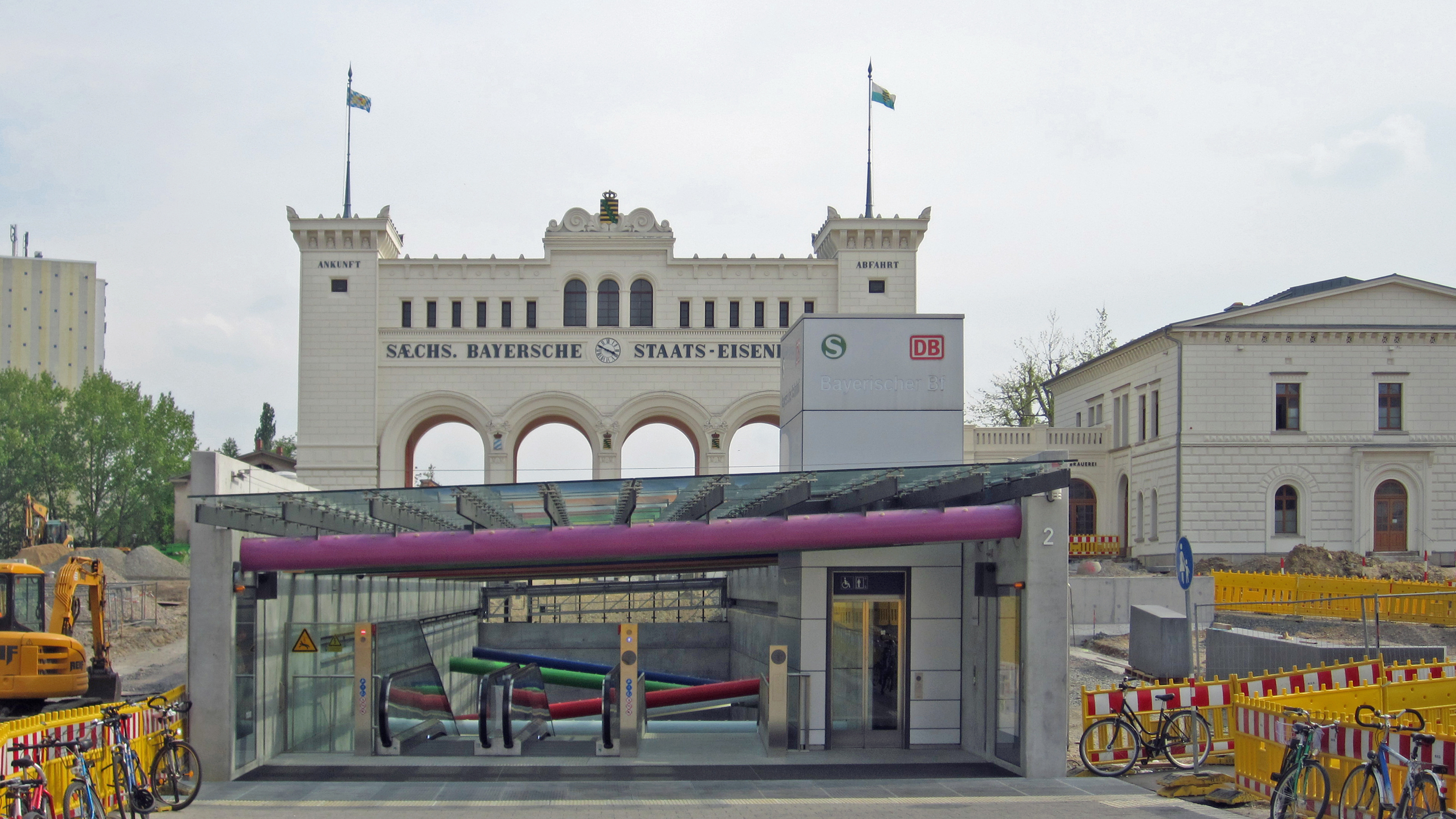
Entrance of Bayerischer Bahnhof station, architect: Peter Kulka

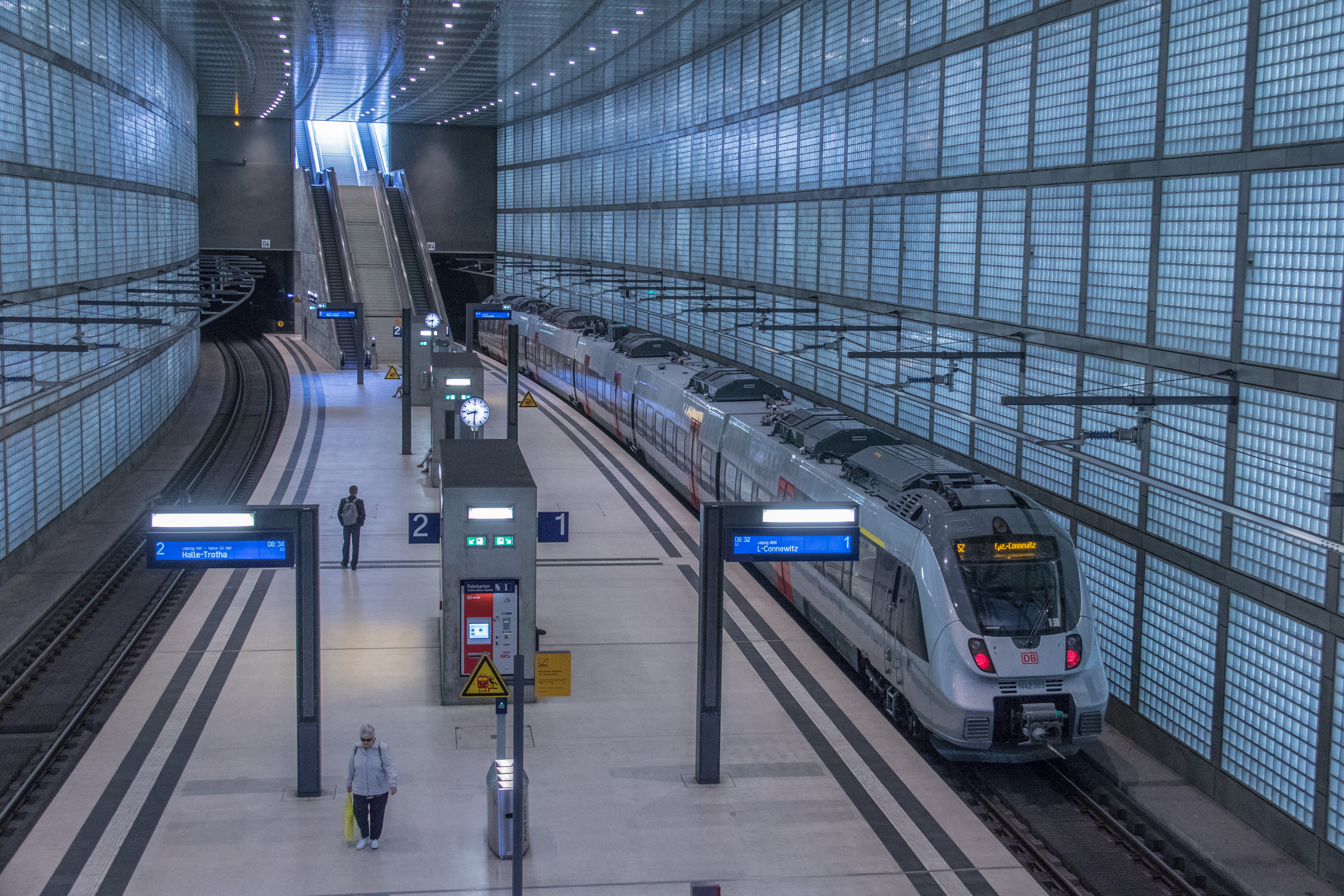
The S-Bahn station beneath Wilhelm-Leuschner-Platz, architect: Max Dudler

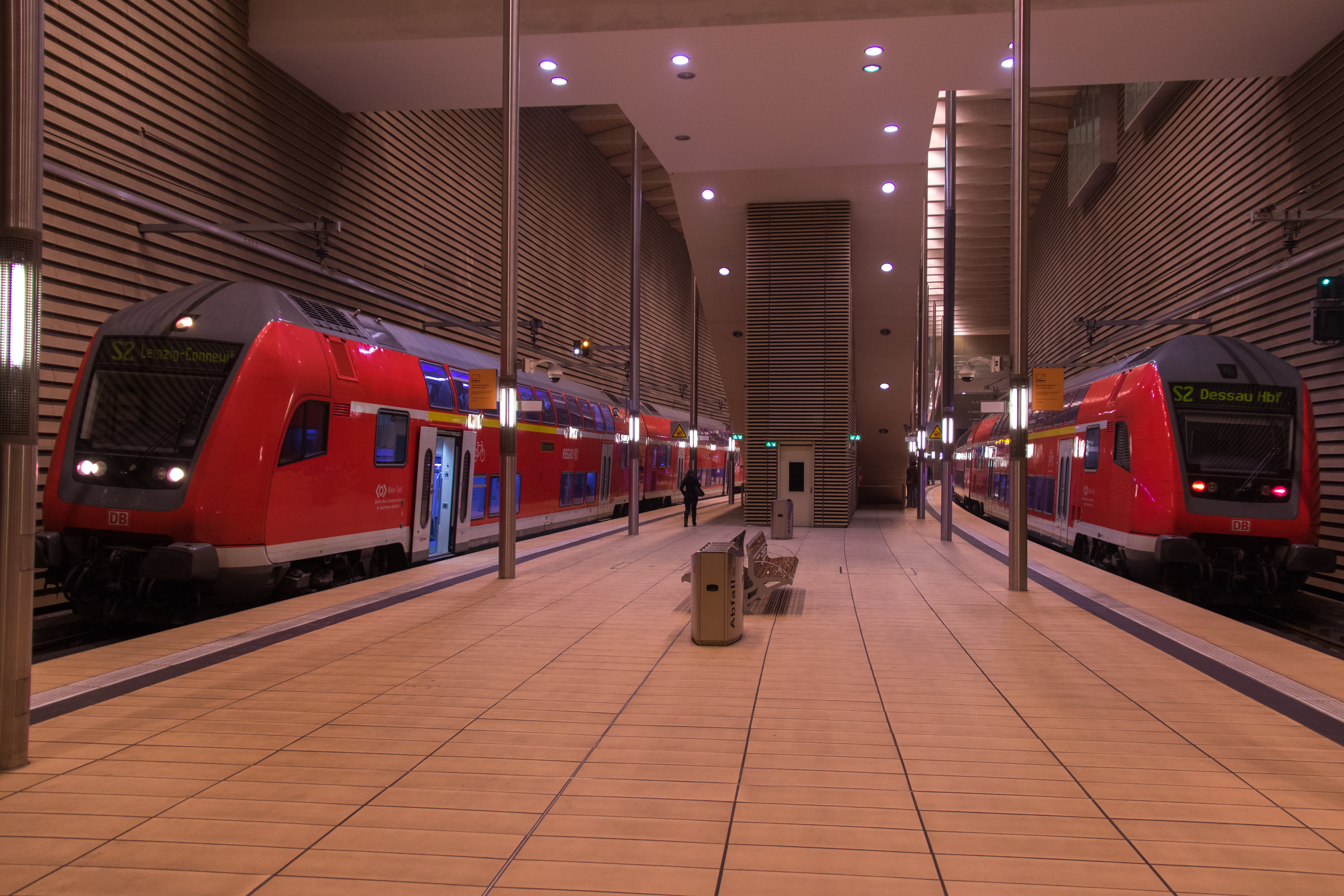
The S-Bahn station Markt in Leipzig

== Operating schedule ==
It was planned that each hour and in each direction, there would be up to ten S-Bahn, two regional trains and one express (as of July 2007).

The S-Bahn network, which is in service since 15 December 2013, is operating as follows (December 2019):

Line	Route
S 1	Leipzig Miltitzer Allee – Leipzig-Leutzsch – Leipzig-Gohlis – City Tunnel – Leipzig-Stötteritz
S 2	Lutherstadt Wittenberg -/Dessau - Bitterfeld – Delitzsch – Leipzig Messe – City Tunnel – Leipzig-Stötteritz
S 3	Halle (Saale) – Schkeuditz – Leipzig-Gohlis – City Tunnel – Leipzig-Stötteritz – Wurzen (– Oschatz) (Wurzen – Oschatz is only operated in weekend nights)
S 4	Hoyerswerda – Torgau – Eilenburg – Taucha – Leipzig-Mockau – City Tunnel – Leipzig-Connewitz – Markkleeberg-Gaschwitz
S 5	Halle (Saale) – Leipzig Messe – City Tunnel – Leipzig-Connewitz – Markkleeberg – Altenburg – Zwickau
S 5X	Halle (Saale) – Leipzig/Halle Airport – Leipzig Messe – City Tunnel – Leipzig-Connewitz – Markkleeberg – Altenburg – Zwickau
S 6	Leipzig Messe – City Tunnel – Leipzig-Connewitz – Markkleeberg – Borna – Geithain

All lines run with intervals of between 30 minutes and 120 minutes. Due to the high number of trains (regional trains, S-Bahn and ICE) between the main station and Leipzig-Leutzsch, since December 2013 the S1 has operated at 15-minute intervals. For this a supplementary track between Leipzig Messe and Leipzig-Stötteritz was introduced. Since December 2017, the S1 is operating in a 30 minutes-interval between Miltitzer Allee and Stötteritz, the services Messe-Stötteritz has been replaced by the new S6.

Before construction, capacity was limited to eleven S-Bahn trains, two regional express trains and one express train per hour in each direction. Critics have expressed doubts that a more appropriate mixed mode of regional and long-distance traffic in the tunnel is possible.

== History ==
A connection between Leipzig Hauptbahnhof and Bayerischer Bahnhof was first considered in 1892. The implementation was planned as an underground railway, running parallel to the two mainline tracks from Borsdorf via the Hauptbahnhof and the Bayerischer Bahnhof and on to Connewitz and Gaschwitz. It would be powered by a Third Rail system. During the construction of the main station (started in 1909), between 1913 and 1914 a 140m long entrance ramp was built from the direction of Dresden with a 675m long tunnel under part of the station. The tunnel ended 8.5 m in front of the station building under the inner city ring road. Beneath the current tram and bus stops, underground platforms 22 and 23 of some 40m in length were built. An extension below the ring road was planned and prepared to a length of 100m. The construction work was suspended during World War I and was not resumed thereafter.

During World War II the tunnel and underground stop were converted to provide air-raid shelters. During the bombing raid on Leipzig on 7 July 1944, there were two explosions that destroyed the tunnel at two places and thus divided it into three parts. During reconstruction of the main station, the area around the second impact point was walled-in, and the platform under the east portico converted into the DEFA-Zeitkino Cinema and was used for this purpose until 1992. During the redevelopment of the main railway station in the years 1995 to 2000, parts of the tunnels under the station were demolished. The tunnel below the apron and the first few metres of the station hall were closed, but remained preserved.

Shortly after World War II, in 1946, planning for an underground city crossing restarted. In order to accommodate the entrance of the tunnel, redevelopment work at the corner of Windmühlen- and Grünewaldstraße was delayed. That would allow a curve to be built with a suitable arc for long-distance trains. The plan foresaw an S-Bahn route and a mainline railway tunnel in the direction of Munich. The latter was dropped a few years later due to the division of Germany. By 1967 three variants for the S-Bahn tunnel had been developed which, together with the current tunnel, no longer ran in the direction of the Dresden route, but rather in the direction of Magdeburg and Berlin. Stations were planned under the Western Hall of the Hauptbahnhof and under the city-centre Markt. Due to the expected high financial and technical effort, the plans were not realized before the end of the GDR.

=== Planning ===
The tunnel is used by 6 out of 7 S-Bahn Mitteldeutschland lines. It is hoped that shorter intervals and faster connections will allow public transport to carry more passengers and thereby relieve road traffic in the city. In addition, it will bring more passengers directly by rail from Leipzig Hauptbahnhof to the city centre and convert the terminus to a partial through-station.

Additionally, it was planned to run one intercity train per hour in each direction through the tunnel. However, until December 2012 the electrified route ended in Reichenbach im Vogtland. Therefore, the states of Saxony and Bavaria, the Federal Government and DB were planning to continue rail electrification first to Hof, and later on to Regensburg and Nuremberg. The section to Hof was fully electrified by 15 December 2013.

Early in 2002, the Saxony State Government gave support for the implementation of the City Tunnel. On 18 March 2003, they approved the project formally.

On 6 January 2010 a correction notice to the tender for the Leipzig train network was issued, announcing that the start of the new train service would be delayed for another year until the timetable change in December 2013.

==== Costs ====
The 2002 framework agreement foresaw the total project cost as €571.62 million, financed by funds from the State of Saxony (€182.02 million), by the European Union (ERDF programme, €168.73 million), the Federal Government (€191.73 million), Deutsche Bahn (€16.36 million) and the City of Leipzig (€12.78 million). This agreement covered many issues, including the refurbishment of the stations and the electrification of several sections.

At the end of 2001 it was expected that the total cost would amount to 1.04 billion DM. DM 240 million would come from the EU Structural Fund. Additional safety measures led to increased costs.

In 2006, the ERDF funding allocated at the end of the funding period was reduced from 168.73 to 127.59. million Euro, which was spent in its entirety. For the 2007-2013 funding period, a further follow-up funding application was submitted, but was not approved (February 2011).

The contractor's representatives DEGES expected the costs in December 2006 to amount to 585 million euro. A risk analysis by Deutsche Bahn saw at that time possible additional costs of up to 73 million euro. In December 2007, the additional cost was estimated at 133 million euro, so that the expected total cost will be 705 million €.

After the estimated total costs had risen by the end of November 2009 to 893 million euro, the state auditors of Saxony reviewed the project. At the end of February 2010, a further cost increase to 960 million Euros was announced. According to the State of Saxony, this remains the expected total cost (as of September 2010).

The federal share provided is limited, in line with the framework agreement, to 191.73 million euro (plus wage and price increases). With the exception of the indexation component, the federal share has already been used in full (as of September 2010). The additional costs are mainly supported by the Free State of Saxony and the City of Leipzig, and to a lesser extent, the German Railways.

The project has been criticised by various parties because of the high construction costs for the relatively lightly used Leipzig S-Bahn, for the limited usability by long-distance trains and for the long-lasting construction work in the city centre, with its associated obstruction and loss of revenue.

=== Construction ===
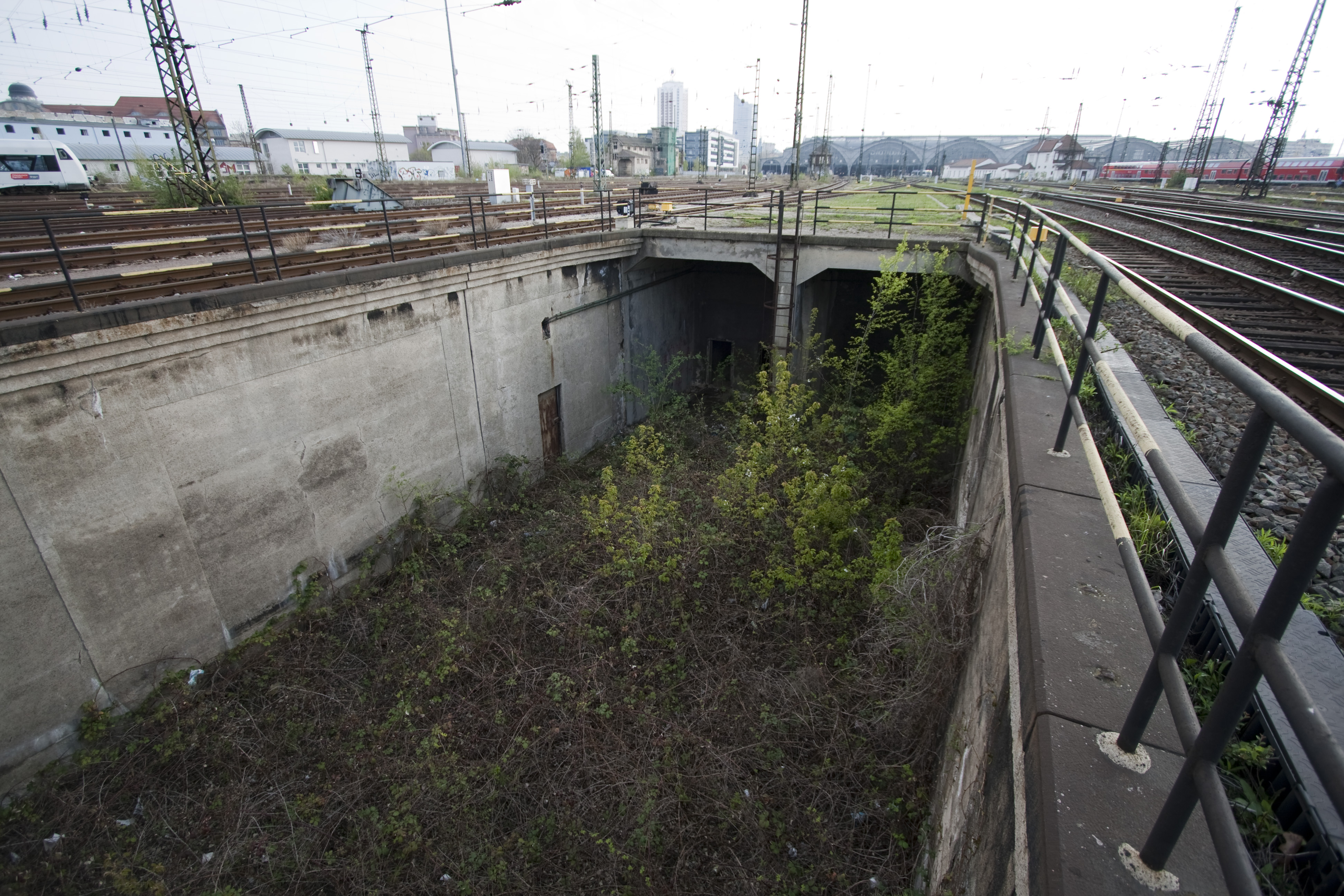
North portal of the unfinished tunnel of 1915 (in 2010)

When constructing Leipzig Hauptbahnhof, the Saxon State Railway had planned a tunnel to Bayerischer Bahnhof. In 1913 and 1915, a 710m long section below tracks 22 and 23 was created before the work came to a halt due to World War I and a lack of funds. As part of the modernisation of the railway station, this tunnel section was excavated in 1997 and demolished within the station hall area.

In the early 1990s the plans for a public transport tunnel through central Leipzig, which had existed for decades, were presented together with the results of new planning in 1995. In 1996 the DB and the Land of Saxony, expressed their support for the project. In the same year the Land, City Planning and DB AG Company founded the planning company S-Bahn Tunnel Leipzig GmbH. Following a cost-benefit analysis in 1998, a planning application was issued. In 2000 planning approval was granted.

In the autumn of 2001, Saxony invited DB to be the owner of the City Tunnel project. The company was therefore expected to build the tunnel on its own financial risk. After the completion of a financing agreement in the spring of 2002 the invitation of the individual building sub-contracts took place.

On 9 July 2003, the construction began with the official groundbreaking. At the start of the construction process, the tunnel was planned to be in operation by late 2009. Initial activities mainly consisted of ground investigations and the relocation of services. The construction of the underground stations began in early 2005.

At the end of March 2005 preparations for building the platform area of the main station began. This space was created for the following excavation. In December 2006, the construction of the ramps at the main station was interrupted after cracks were found in neighbouring station buildings. Between 17 February and 25 March 2007 two auxiliary bridges of 105 m were built as part of the construction in the Central Station. In addition 1,400 metres of track and eight sets of points were rebuilt.

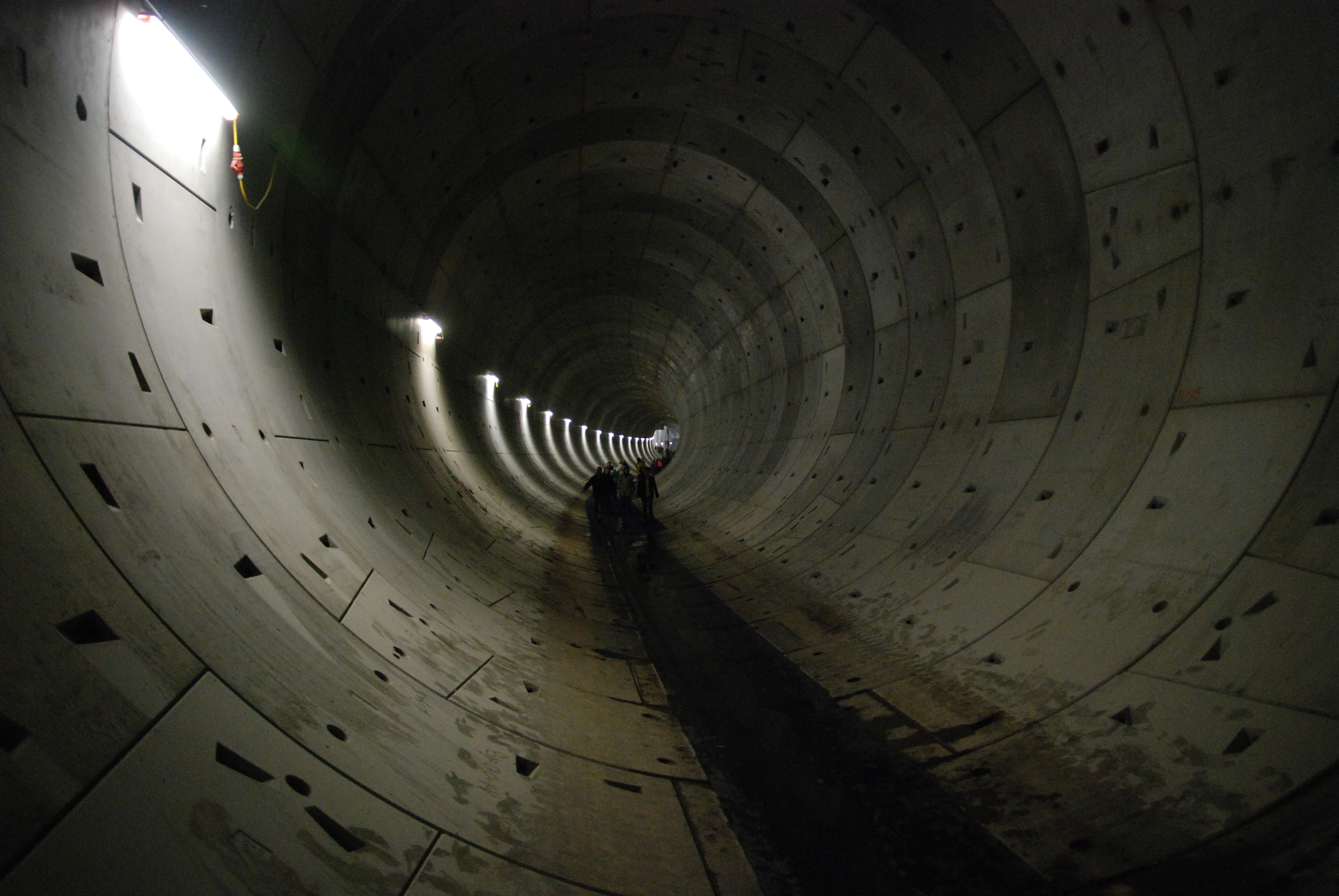
Bare tunnel before fit-out (in 2008)

On 11 January 2007 the tunnel boring machine called Leonie began (with a ceremony at the Bayerischer Bahnhof) to symbolically bore the first tunnel. The tunnel's godmother is Angelika Meeth-Milbradt, wife of then Prime Minister of Saxony Georg Milbradt The excavation began on 15 January 2007 and on 10 March 2008 reached the railway station, so completing the first bore. After the return of the tunnel boring machine to Bayerischer Bahnhof in late March 2008, the excavation began of the second bore on 9 May 2008. On 31 October 2008, the tunnel boring of the tunnel ended with the completion of the second bore.

Ahead of the expected opening in December 2013, activities centred on the interior fitting-out of the tunnel and railway stations. In mid-February 2009, the contract to develop the five stations was advertised throughout Europe. The contract ran from February 2010 to November 2011. The tender has been divided between two companies.

== Construction technique ==
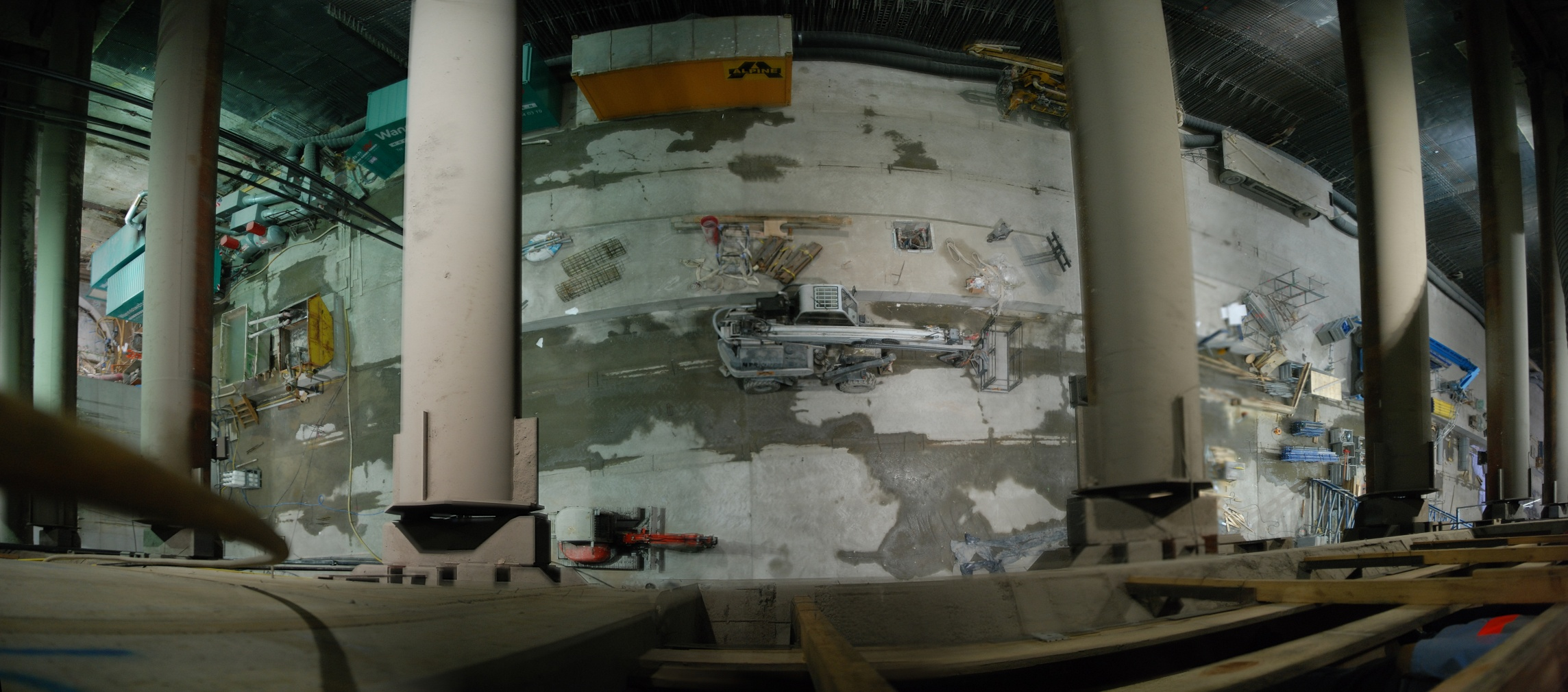
conscripts and braced excavation of the Markt station

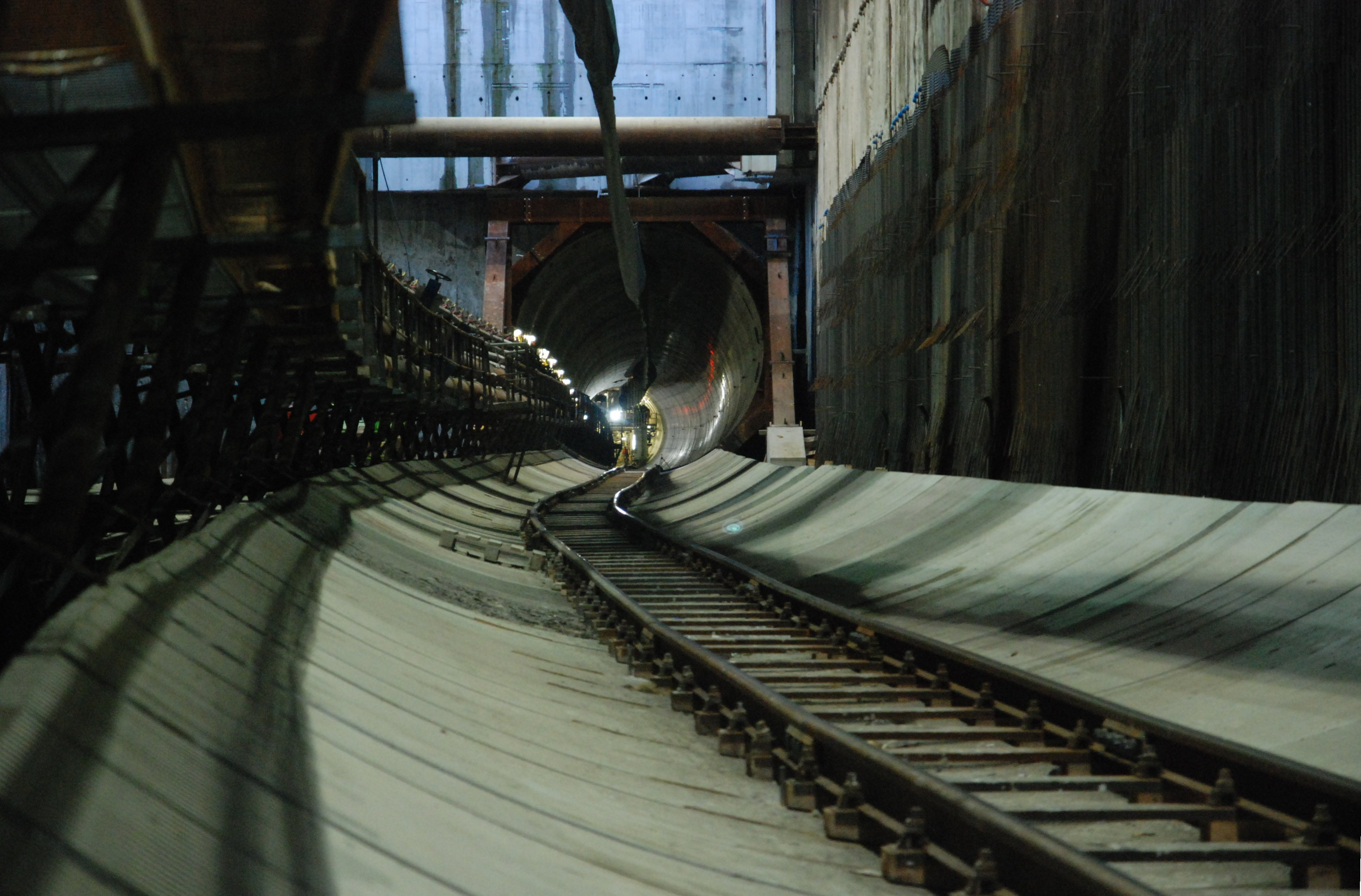
Wilhelm-Leuschner-Platz station, overlooking the tunnel boring machine

The two 1438-m-long tunnels were largely dug using a 65-m Tunnel Boring Machines. The start of the tunnel boring machine work was in the pit at Bayerischen Bahnhof, from where they worked towards the Central Station. There it was dismantled and re-built at Bayerischen Bahnhof, after which it started a second time. At Bayerischen Bahnhof and at all other stops between, three slurry walls were constructed. The slurry was mixed with cement and hardened in the slot. This mass then formed a waterproof wall through which the tunnel boring machines could run without the surrounding water and rock penetrating.

The tunnel has an excavated diameter of nine metres and was driven by a fluid-based plate. This generates a positive pressure that prevented the ingress of water and rock into the tunnel. Using this approach, however, there is a danger that the pressure is lost due to old water wells with the collapse of the ground in front of the tunnel boring machine. The coverage varies from eight to sixteen metres. The shortest distance between the building foundation and tunnel roof is under the Petersbogen underground carpark at 2.20 metres. The tunnel was in the ground water at a pressure altitude of approximately 16 m to the bottom of the tunnel. The lining of the tunnel was carried out with seven re-enforced concrete segments, which form a tunnel ring, which are 40 cm thick and a keystone. For the two tunnels approximately 13,000 segments were required.

When tunnelling in soft ground it is expected that the tunnel will sag due to soil loss (sagging of the soil after tunnelling or mining operations) which cannot be avoided completely. The lower tray is about 60 to 80 m wide. The depth depends (among other things) on the type of coverage, the shear strength of the soil and the overlay. A maximal deviation of 20 to 30 mm is anticipated after the second tunnel bore. All buildings that are in the tunnel route and affected, have been examined in advance. (Drilling, geotechnical investigation, Bauakteneinsicht)

The crossing under the main railway station is not done by the tunnel boring machine, but by manual digging. There were extensive measures to secure the main railway station against the building work. The plan was to freeze the pit edge and drive through this frozen ground under the station. The plans include two tunnel excavations with a diameter of 2.40 m using compressed air and a cover plate. From this side vertical tubes were inserted to freeze the ground were built and the ground was frozen into a waterproof layer.

=== Compensation grouting process (CGP) ===
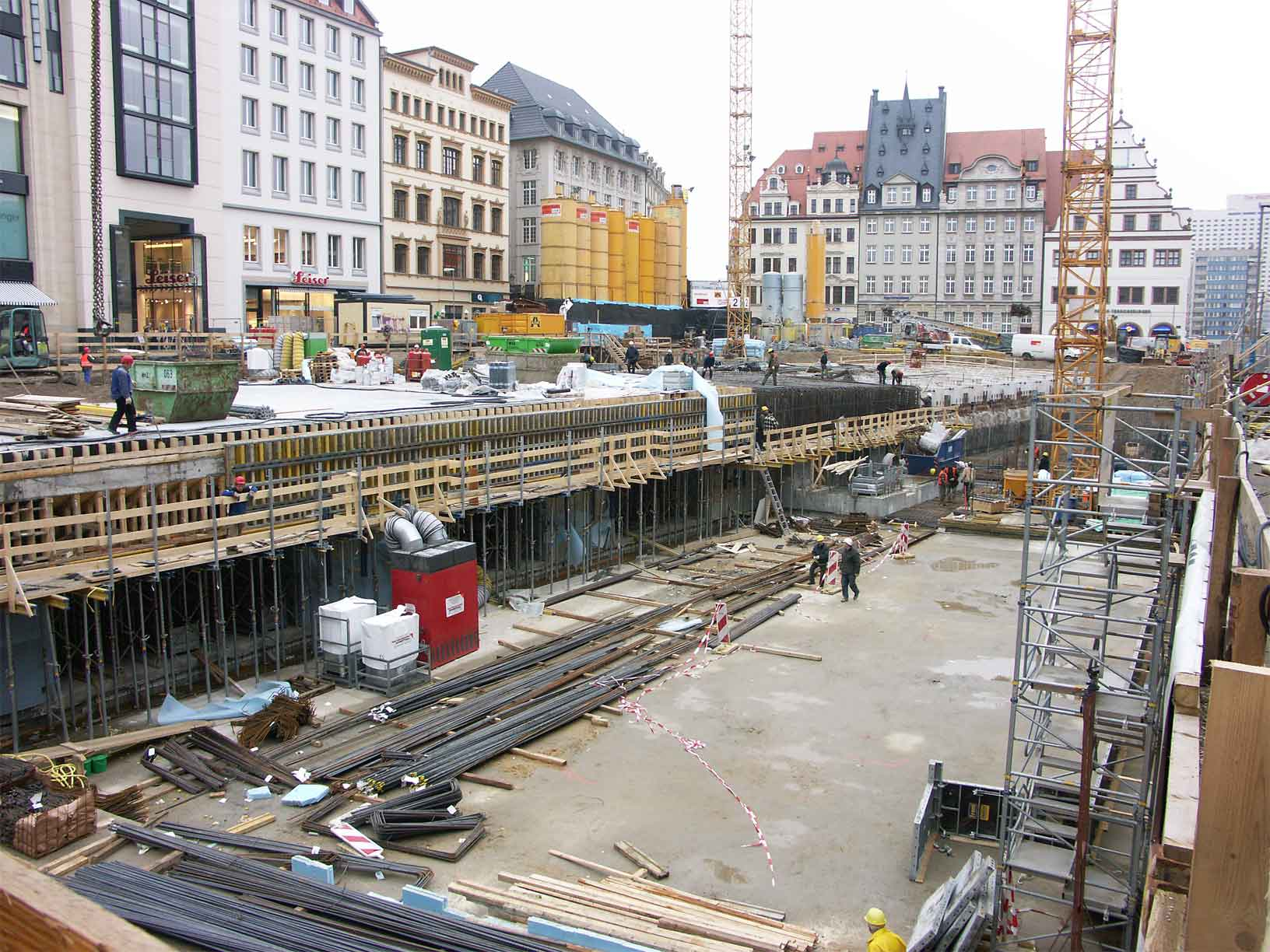
Construction at Marktplatz in February 2006

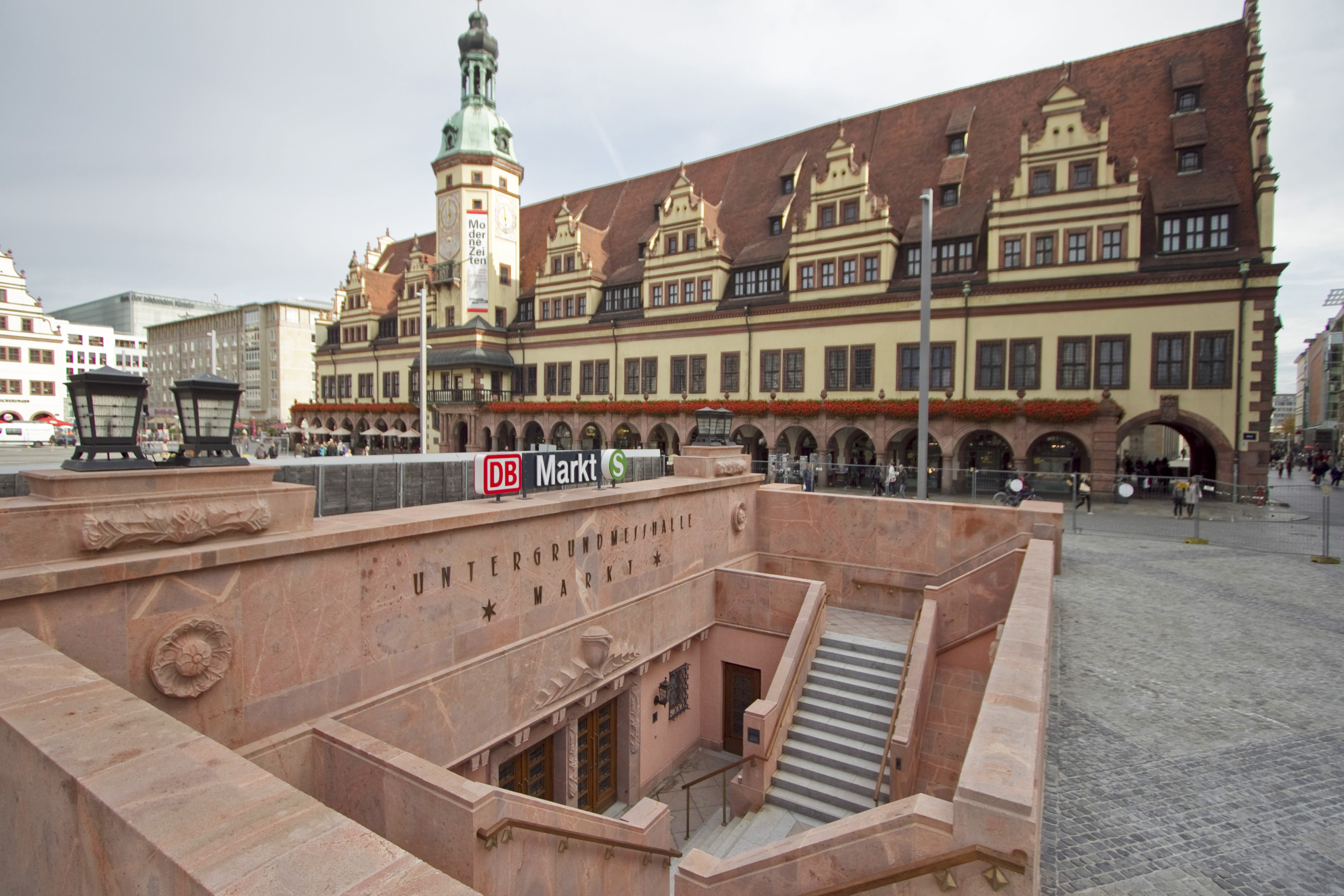
Entrance of Markt station

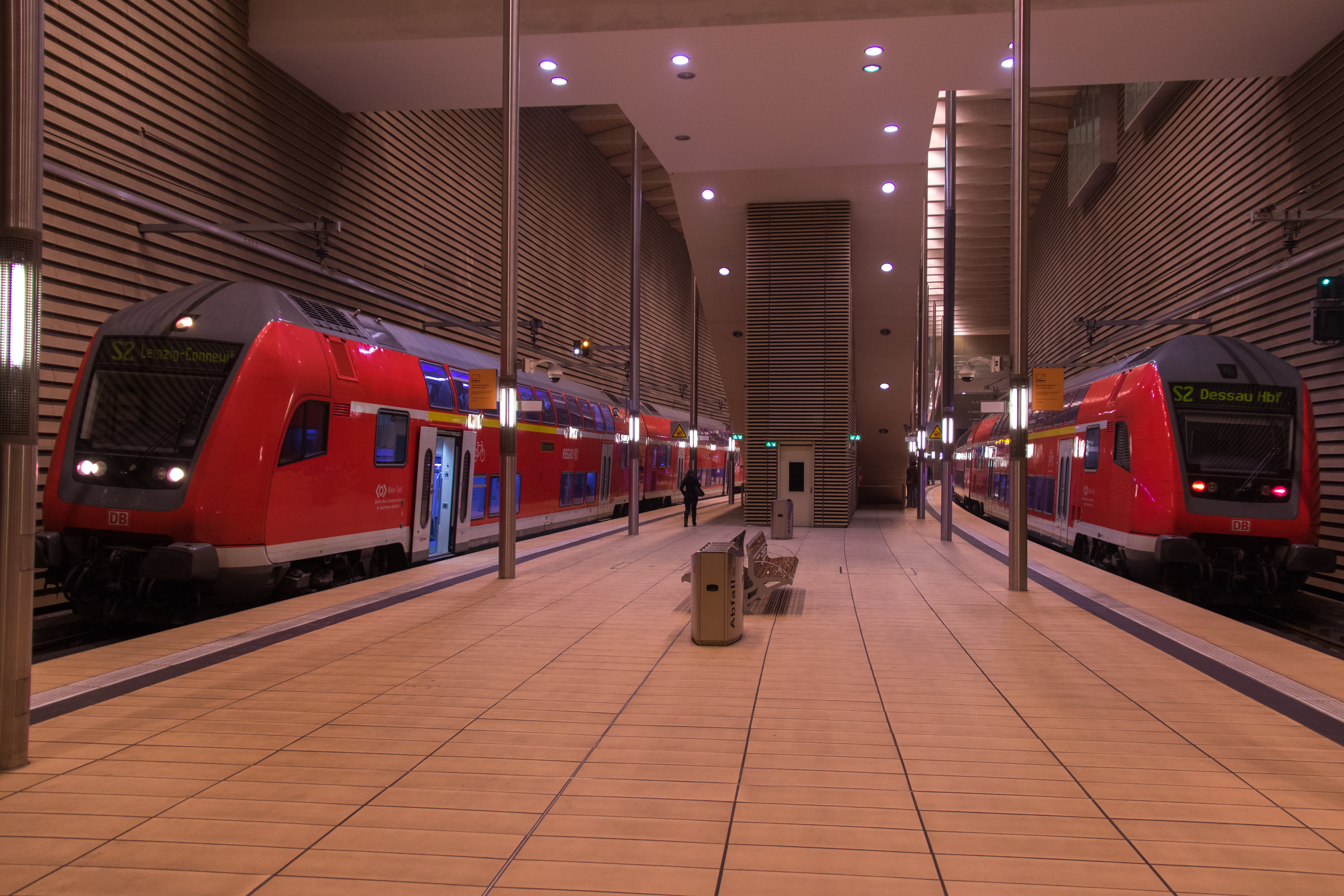
Trains of S-Bahn Mitteldeutschland at Markt station

In order to prevent settlement of more than 30 millimeters at the tunnel grout shafts have been built. Of these, were generated as necessary, heave of the soil by high-pressure injections. Partially, the soil was already previously raised by a few millimetres in order to reduce the final setting depth. Under the Petersstrasse an about 250 m long supply tunnel from GDR times was used for the injection. It begins and ends at St. Peter's bow on the market. All the buildings in Petersstrasse can be achieved. Of the Verpressschächten holes were made, terminating at the buildings. These holes are provided as needed and then with Verpressrohren Verpressgut is introduced under high pressure. The Verpressgut is composed of binder and water.

Here, the Compensations-grouting process was applied. For it are in different places pits, the so-called CGV-shafts arranged. Overall, the method consists of four phases. First, dug wells or pits at appropriate points, be created from which horizontal wells. This can be, according to a length of up to 70 m. In the horizontal drilling valve tubes are installed. Through these tubes is finally pressed cement into the ground. This will start the actual backup of the building. The soil is compacted and any gaps there may be filled.

In a second phase, the land in some places is controlled by additional increased pumping. The elevation is to compensate for reductions occurring under certain circumstances during the tunneling. At the time the bore of the City Tunnel tubes the buildings in the vicinity of the bore be monitored. With precise technique smallest movements are registered. Accurate to 0.25 mm, the units can monitor the structural elements of buildings. For the case that the uplift not the actually occurring reduction can compensate, further cement is pressed into the ground and kept the buildings at a constant level.

Even after the completion of the excavation, the houses are still monitored regularly and, if carried further injections.
