= Markkleeberg-Gaschwitz station =

Railway halt in Markkleeberg, Germany

Markkleeberg Gaschwitz
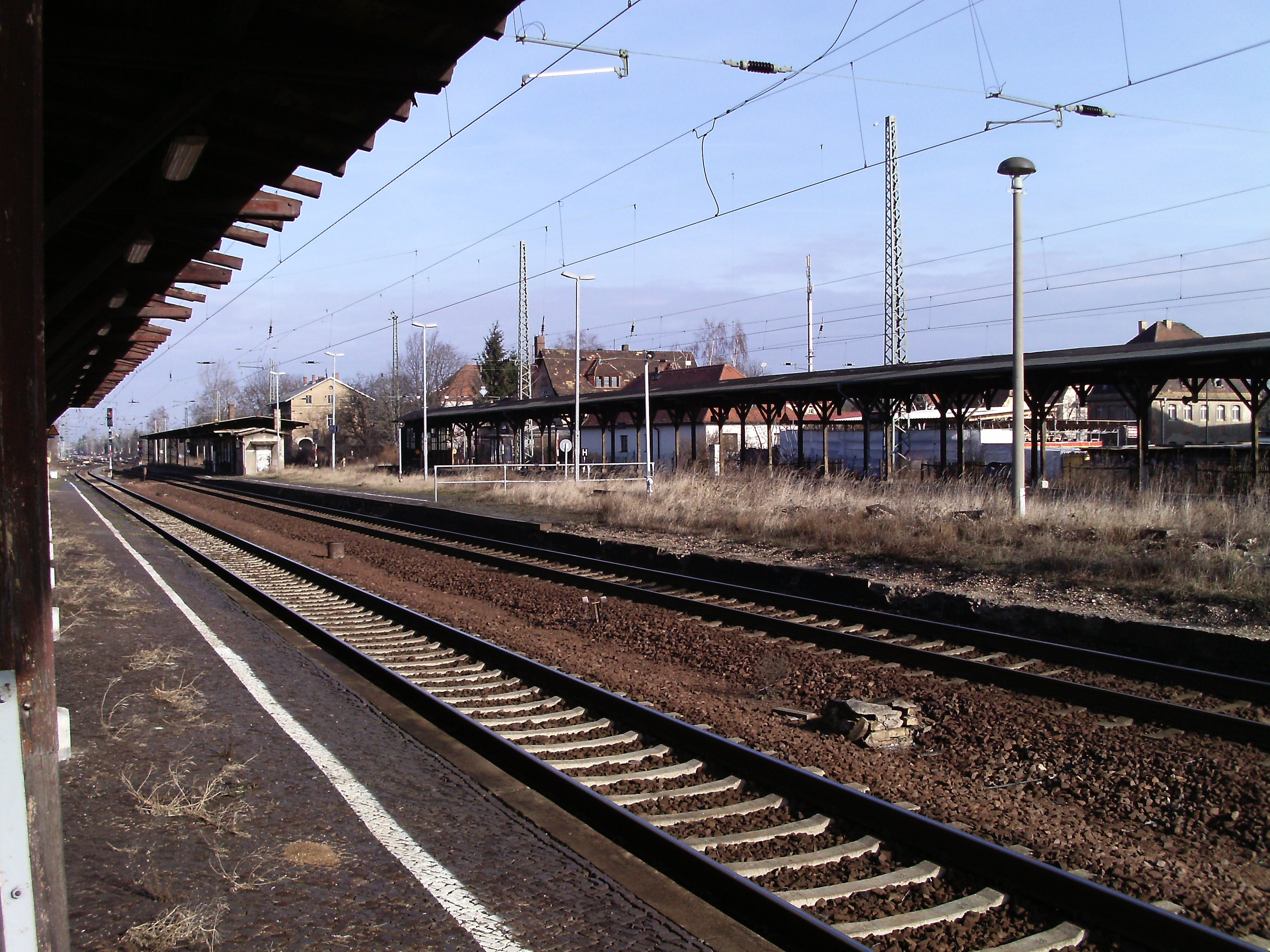
- Markkleeberg-Gaschwitz station in 2012 before reconstruction

General information
- Location: Hauptstr. 312, Markkleeberg, Saxony; Germany
- Coordinates: 51°15′00″N 12°22′44″E
- Lines: Leipzig–Hof; Leipzig-Plagwitz–Markkleeberg-Gaschwitz; Gaschwitz–Meuselwitz (until 1998)
- Platforms: 4

Construction
- Accessible: Yes

Other information
- Station code: 2017
- DS100 code: LGW
- IBNR: 8011598
- Category: 5
- Fare zone: MDV: 151
- Website: www.bahnhof.de

History
- Opened: 19 September 1842

Services
Preceding station	Mitteldeutschland S-Bahn	Following station
Markkleeberg-Großstädteln towards Falkenberg (Elster)	S 4	Terminus
Markkleeberg-Großstädteln towards Leipzig Messe	S 6	Großdeuben towards Geithain
Location
- Location within Saxony Location within Germany Location within Europe

Markkleeberg-Gaschwitz is a railway station in Markkleeberg, Germany. The station is located on the Leipzig–Hof railway and the Leipzig-Plagwitz–Markkleeberg-Gaschwitz railway. The train services are operated by Deutsche Bahn. Since December 2013 the station is served by the S-Bahn Mitteldeutschland.

Bundesautobahn 38 crosses the line over a bridge in the area of the station. The separate suburban tracks (line 6377) end at the southern end of Gaschwitz station and from there to Böhlen there is an additional freight track (line 6378) next to the tracks of the main line.

== History ==
Gaschwitz halt was opened on the Leipzig–Hof railway on 19 September 1842. The station was expanded into a major marshalling yard for freight transport in 1870. Subsequently, the station became an important point for changing trains in the south of Leipzig. The Gaschwitz–Meuselwitz railway opened to Zwenkau in 1874 and the Leipzig-Plagwitz–Markkleeberg-Gaschwitz railway in 1879. The Leipzig S-Bahn-Netz was opened in 1969 with Gaschwitz as the southern reversal point of the heart-shaped line A.

The railway connection to Zwenkau was shut down and dismantled in 1957 because of the advance of open-cast mining in Zwenkau. Since 2002, the line to Leipzig-Plagwitz has only been used as an occasional diversion route for freight or regional traffic. Two of the original six platforms at Gaschwitz station are still in operation. These have been served since 15 December 2013 at half-hour intervals in both directions by services of the S-Bahn Mitteldeutschland between Leipzig and Geithain. At the same time, the station was renamed Markkleeberg-Gaschwitz.

== Train services ==
The station is served by lines S4 and S6 of the S-Bahn Mitteldeutschland.
