= Leipzig Messe station =

Railway station in Leipzig, Germany

Leipzig Messe
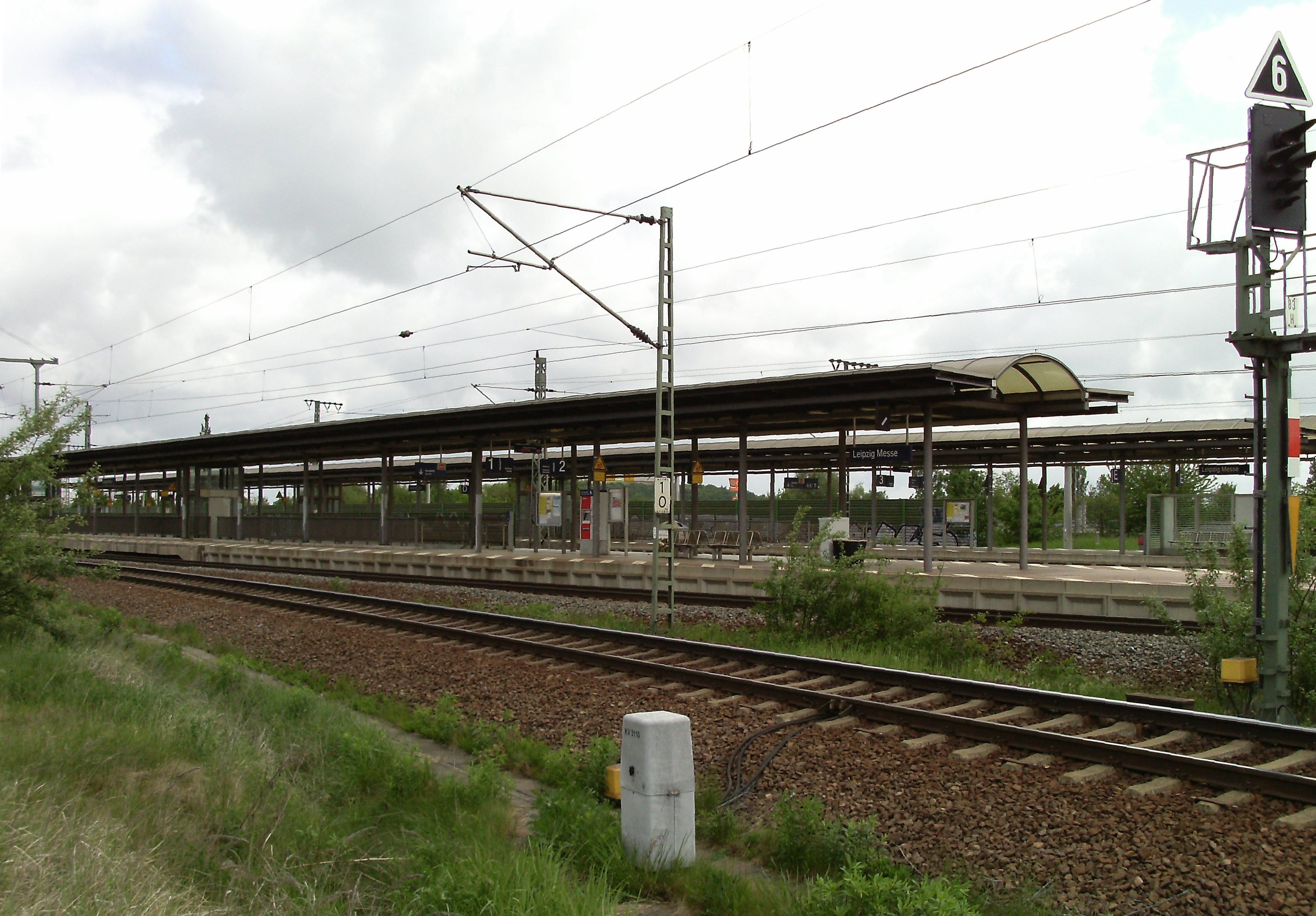
- Leipzig Messe station

General information
- Location: Leipzig, Saxony; Germany
- Coordinates: 51°23′45″N 12°23′22″E
- Lines: Trebnitz–Leipzig; Erfurt–Leipzig/Halle
- Platforms: 4

Other information
- Station code: 7848
- DS100 code: LNW
- Category: 3
- Fare zone: MDV: 110

History
- Opened: 1 January 1908; 118 years ago
- Electrified: 1914-1914 (Note: Since 1915 catenaries were dismantled to gain copper for war production.); 1921-1946 (Note: Since 1946 catenaries and overhead line masts were dismantled as Soviet war reparations.); 9 June 1958; 68 years ago
- Former names: 1908-1996 Neuwiederitzsch; 1996-2003 Neuwiederitzsch-Leipziger Messe; 2003-2008 Leipzig Neue Messe

Services
Preceding station	Mitteldeutschland S-Bahn	Following station
Rackwitz towards Dessau Hbf or Lutherstadt Wittenberg Hbf	S 2	Leipzig Essener Straße towards Leipzig-Stötteritz
Leipzig/Halle Airport towards Halle (Saale) Hbf	S 5	Leipzig Hbf towards Zwickau Hbf
Leipzig/Halle Airport towards Halle (Saale) Hbf	S 5x	Leipzig Hbf towards Zwickau Hbf
Terminus	S 6	Leipzig Essener Straße towards Geithain
Preceding station	DB Regio Südost	Following station
Delitzsch unt Bf towards Magdeburg Hbf	RE 13	Leipzig Hbf Terminus
Location
- Location within Saxony Location within Germany Location within Europe

Leipzig Messe (German: Bahnhof Leipzig Messe) is a railway station located in Leipzig, Germany, serving the Leipzig Trade Fair. The station is located on the Trebnitz–Leipzig railway. The train services are operated by Deutsche Bahn. Since December 2013 the station is served by the S-Bahn Mitteldeutschland.

== Train services ==
The following services currently call at the station:

== See also ==
- Rail transport in Germany
