= Geithain station =

Railway station in Geithain, Germany

Geithain
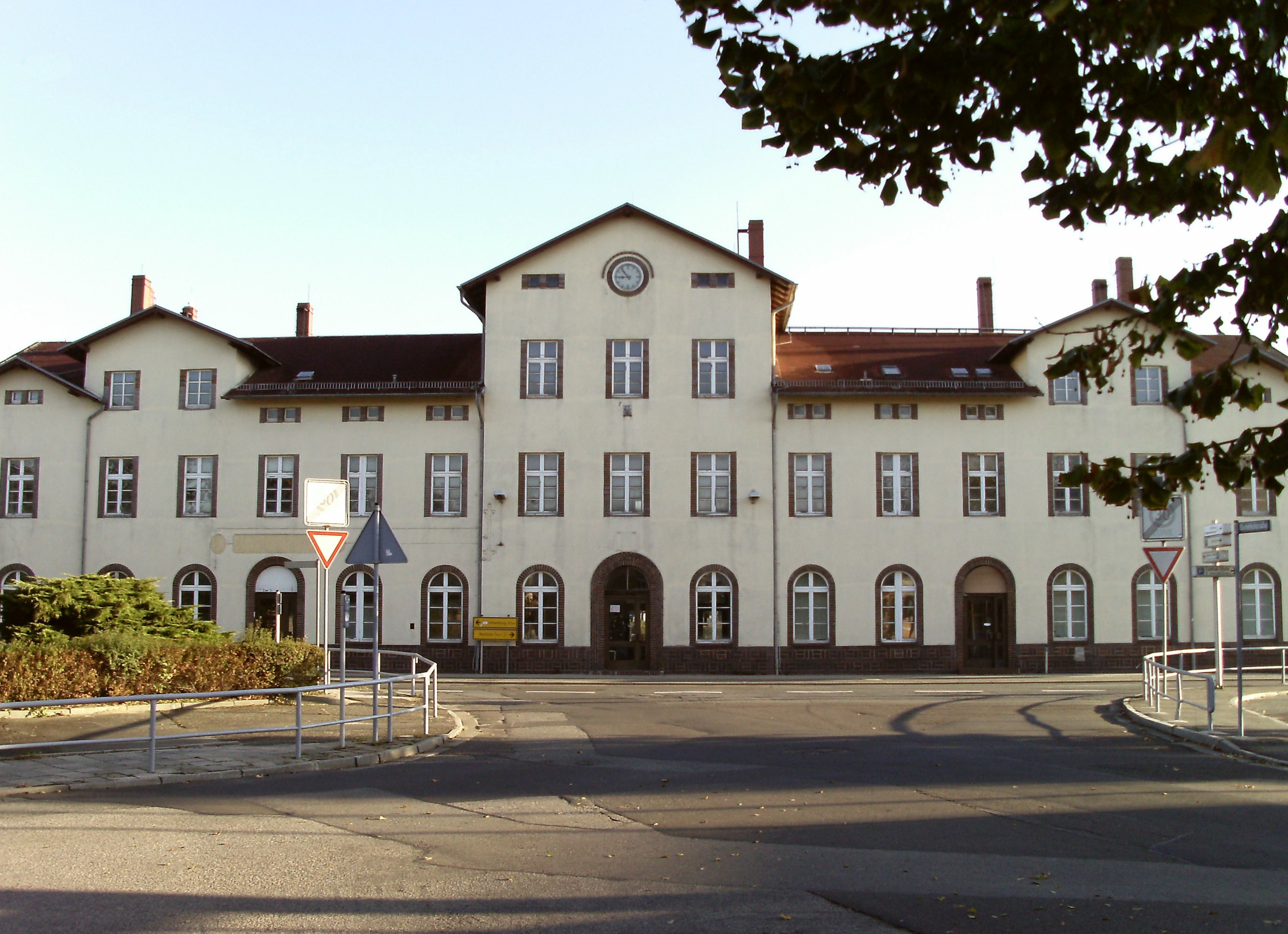
- The Geithain station building in 2011

General information
- Location: Eisenbahnstr. 2, 04643 Geithain; Saxony, Germany
- Coordinates: 51.0582035°N 12.6976207°E
- Lines: Neukieritzsch–Chemnitz; Leipzig–Geithain
- Platforms: 2
- Tracks: 4

Other information
- Station code: 2048
- DS100 code: LGH
- Category: 4
- Fare zone: MDV: 154
- Website: www.bahnhof.de

Services
Preceding station	Mitteldeutsche Regiobahn	Following station
Bad Lausick towards Leipzig Hbf	RE 6	Narsdorf towards Chemnitz Hbf
Preceding station	DB Regio Südost	Following station
Tautenhain towards Leipzig Hbf	RB 113	Terminus
Preceding station	Mitteldeutschland S-Bahn	Following station
Frohburg towards Leipzig Messe	S 6	Terminus
Location
- Location within Saxony Location within Germany Location within Europe

Geithain railway station (German: Bahnhof Geithain) is a railway station in Geithain, Germany. The station is located on the Neukieritzsch–Chemnitz and Leipzig–Geithain lines. It is operated by DB Station&Service.

== Services ==
=== Railway services ===
Train services are currently operated by DB Regio and Mitteldeutsche Regiobahn, a subsidiary of Transdev Germany. As of 10 December 2017, the following services call at the station:

RE 6 and S6 operate hourly and usually connect to each other as S6 and both directions of RE 6 arrive and depart approximately at the same time. RB113 operates during peak hours hourly as well, all other times every 2 hours. RB113 arrives and departs about 30 minutes later than RE 6, which allows northbound connections from Geithain towards Bad Lausick and Leipzig every 30 minutes.

=== Local transport ===
Many regional bus lines frequently stop at this station. The bus station is located near the railway station.
