= Mitteldeutscher Verkehrsverbund =

German public transport association

- Industry: Public transport
- Founded: 1998; 28 years ago
- Headquarters: Halle (Saale), Germany
- Area served: Greater Halle (Saale)/Leipzig area

The Mitteldeutscher Verkehrsverbund (MDV) is a transport association in the German Leipzig-Halle (Saale) area. The company is based in Halle (Saale), but its head office is in Leipzig.

The MDV is a so-called mixed transport association (Mischverbund). Its shareholders are the public authorities (e.g. the administrative districts) (51%) and the transport companies (49%). The aim of the MDV is to make it easier for everyone in Mitteldeutschland to travel by local trains, S-Bahn, tram and bus. The MDV already offers a uniform ticket system and is working on a coordinated timetable.

== History ==
The association was introduced with a uniform tariff system on 1 August 2001 in four administrative districts and the two cities, and has since been expanded several times: on 1 August 2004, the last unaffiliated administrative districts in Saxony were included, and on 1 August 2005, Altenburg, the area of the former GDR district of Leipzig, which is still strongly oriented towards Leipzig, was completed in the MDV. Negotiations on the accession of the Bitterfeld district were also started shortly after its introduction, but have not been successful to date. In contrast to the first accession, the state of Saxony-Anhalt now no longer wants to reimburse through tariffing losses.

== Public authorities ==
MDV area

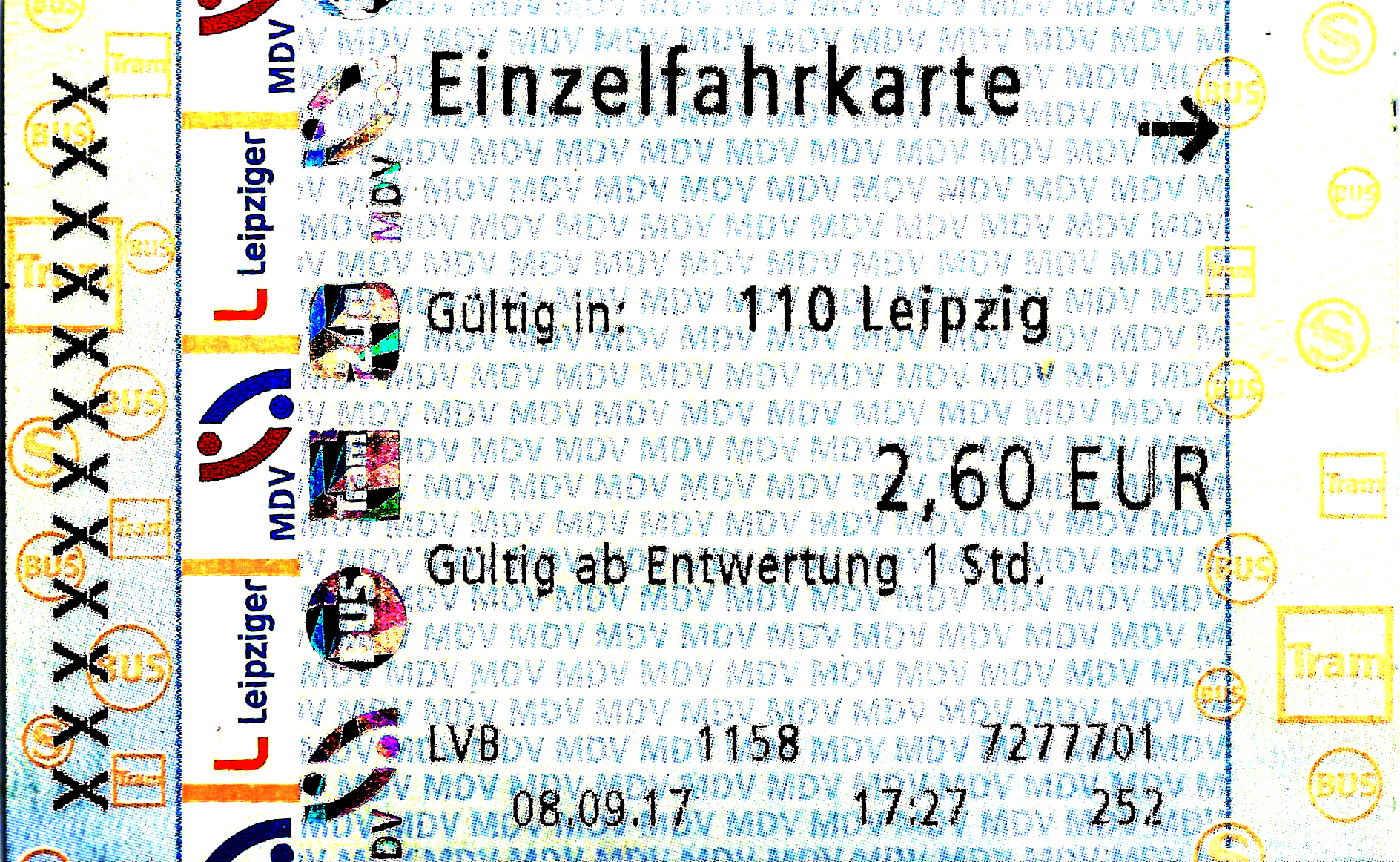
MDV ticket for zone 110 in Leipzig issued by Leipziger Verkehrsbetriebe (LVB).

The MDV includes (year of accession in brackets):

- in Saxony, the former Direktionsbezirk Leipzig:
  - City of Leipzig (since 2001)
  - Leipzig district (former Leipziger Land district since 2001, former Muldentalkreis district since 2004)
  - Nordsachsen district (former Delitzsch district since 2001, former Torgau-Oschatz district since 2004)
  - Zweckverband für den Nahverkehrsraum Leipzig (ZVNL)
- in Saxony-Anhalt parts of the former administrative Halle district:
  - City of Halle (Saale) (since 2001)
  - Saalekreis (former district of Merseburg-Querfurt and former Saalkreis since 2001)
  - Burgenlandkreis (old Burgenlandkreis and former district of Weißenfels since 2004)
  - Nahverkehrsservice Sachsen-Anhalt (NASA)
- in Thuringia, the area formerly belonging to the Bezirk Leipzig:
  - Altenburger Land district (since 2005)

From 2004, the former district of Döbeln was also part of the MDV. As a result of the Saxon district reform of 2008, however, this became part of the administrative district of Mittelsachsen. Since August 2011, the entire district of Mittelsachsen, including the former district of Döbeln, has belonged to the Verkehrsverbund Mittelsachsen (VMS). Only for journeys between the former district of Döbeln and the MDV across all areas of the association there are still transitional tariff regulations.

It was announced in February 2018 that the area would be extended to include the districts of Anhalt-Bitterfeld and Wittenberg as well as the city of Dessau-Roßlau. As of December 2019, rail traffic in this area will initially be integrated into the MDV and full integration with bus and tram traffic will be sought. Also in December 2019, Könnern station in the Salzlandkreis district will become part of the network.

== Transport companies ==
=== Railway companies ===
- Abellio Rail Mitteldeutschland
- Burgenlandbahn
- DB Regio Südost
- Döllnitzbahn
- Erfurter Bahn
- Transdev Regio Ost
- Transdev Sachsen-Anhalt

=== Tram and bus ===
- Hallesche Verkehrs-AG (HAVAG)
- Leipziger Verkehrsbetriebe (LVB)

=== Bus ===
- Auto Webel
- Busverkehr Geißler
- OBS Omnibusbetrieb Saalekreis
- Omnibusverkehrsgesellschaft mbH „Heideland“ (OVH)
- Omnibusverkehr Leupold
- Personennahverkehrsgesellschaft Merseburg-Querfurt
- Personenverkehrsgesellschaft Burgenlandkreis
- Regionalbus Leipzig (until 12 Dezember 2014 Personenverkehrsgesellschaft Muldental (PVM))
- Regionalverkehr Bitterfeld-Wolfen
- Reiseverkehr Schulze
- THÜSAC Personennahverkehrsgesellschaft
