= Puchau =

Puchau may refer to the following places:

- Púchov, Slovakia
- Püchau, Machern, Saxony, Germany
