= Borsdorf =

- Municipality
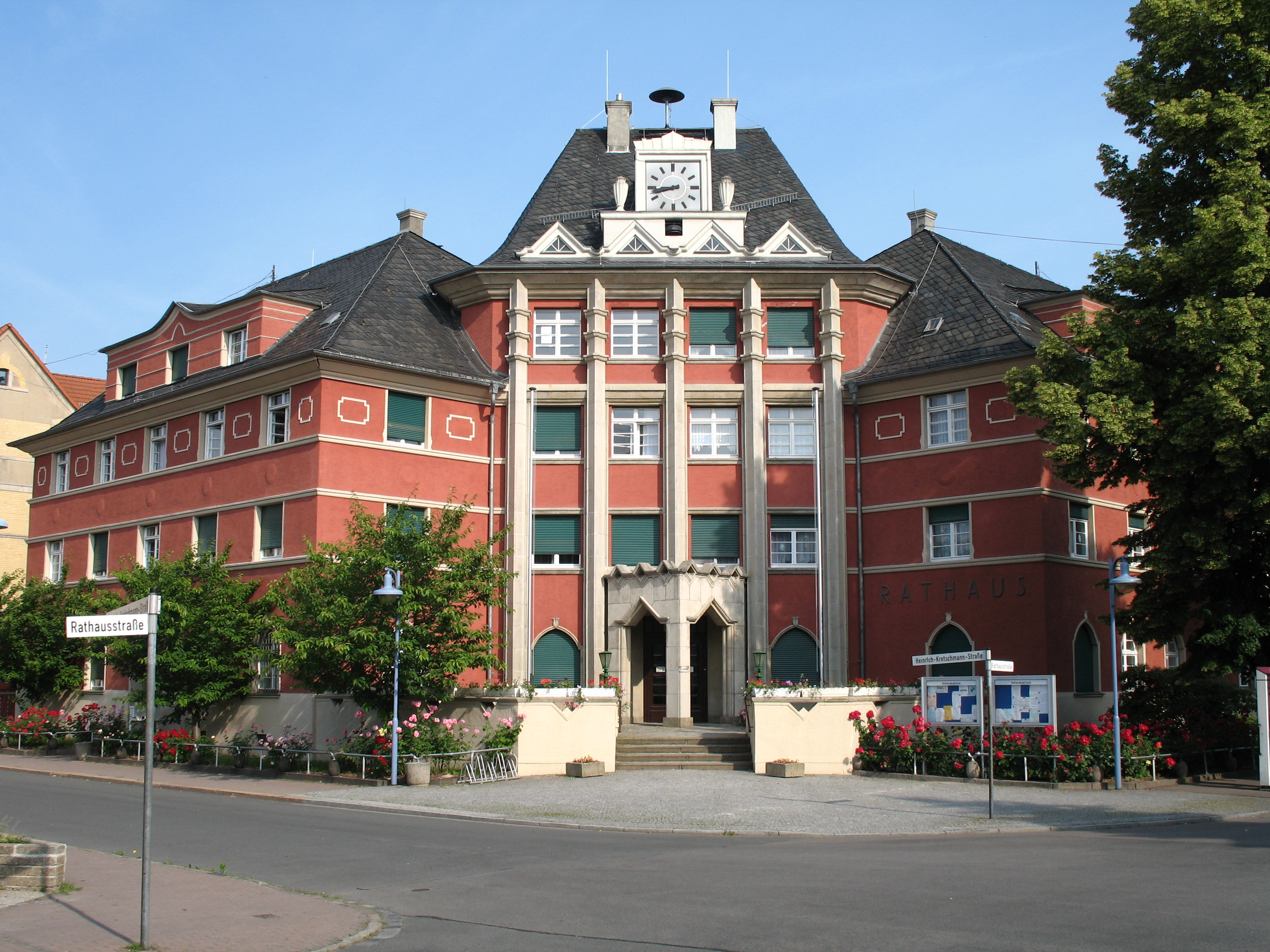
- Town hall

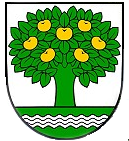
- Coat of arms

- Location of Borsdorf within Leipzig district
- Interactive map of Borsdorf
- Location within Germany Location within Saxony
- Coordinates: 51°20′49″N 12°32′18″E
- Country: Germany
- State: Saxony
- District: Leipzig
- Subdivisions: 3

Government
  - Mayor (2020–27): Birgit Kaden (CDU)

Area
  - Total: 15.56 km^{2} (6.01 sq mi)
- Elevation: 152 m (499 ft)

Population (2025-12-31)
  - Total: 8,089
  - Density: 519.9/km^{2} (1,346/sq mi)
- Time zone: UTC+01:00 (CET)
  - Summer (DST): UTC+02:00 (CEST)
- Postal codes: 04451
- Dialling codes: 034291
- Vehicle registration: L, BNA, GHA, GRM, MTL, WUR
- Website: www.borsdorf.de

Borsdorf is a municipality in the Leipzig district in Saxony, Germany.

== Geography ==
Modern Borsdorf municipality consists of three historical villages: Borsdorf (originally the smallest among the three, serving as a toll station at the historical main road from Leipzig to Dresden), Panitzsch (a settlement of Slavic origin) and Zweenfurth (named after a river crossing). All three villages are situated along the Parthe river.

Borsdorf is neighbouring Leipzig in the west, Taucha in the north, Machern in the east and Brandis in the south-east.

== Transport ==
Borsdorf is located at the railway mainline between Leipzig and Dresden. It is served by local commuter trains, the rapid transit network of S-Bahn Mitteldeutschland as well as the Regional Express train (Regionalexpress) Leipzig-Dresden. In Borsdorf station, the second Leipzig–Dresden line branches off which historically was an important alternative connection to Dresden via Meissen and is still in use today.

The municipality is linked to Leipzig via the B6 federal highway. The closest expressway is Bundesautobahn A14, approx. 4 km west of Borsdorfp.

Leipzig-Halle Airport can be reached within 30 minutes by car.

== Gallery ==
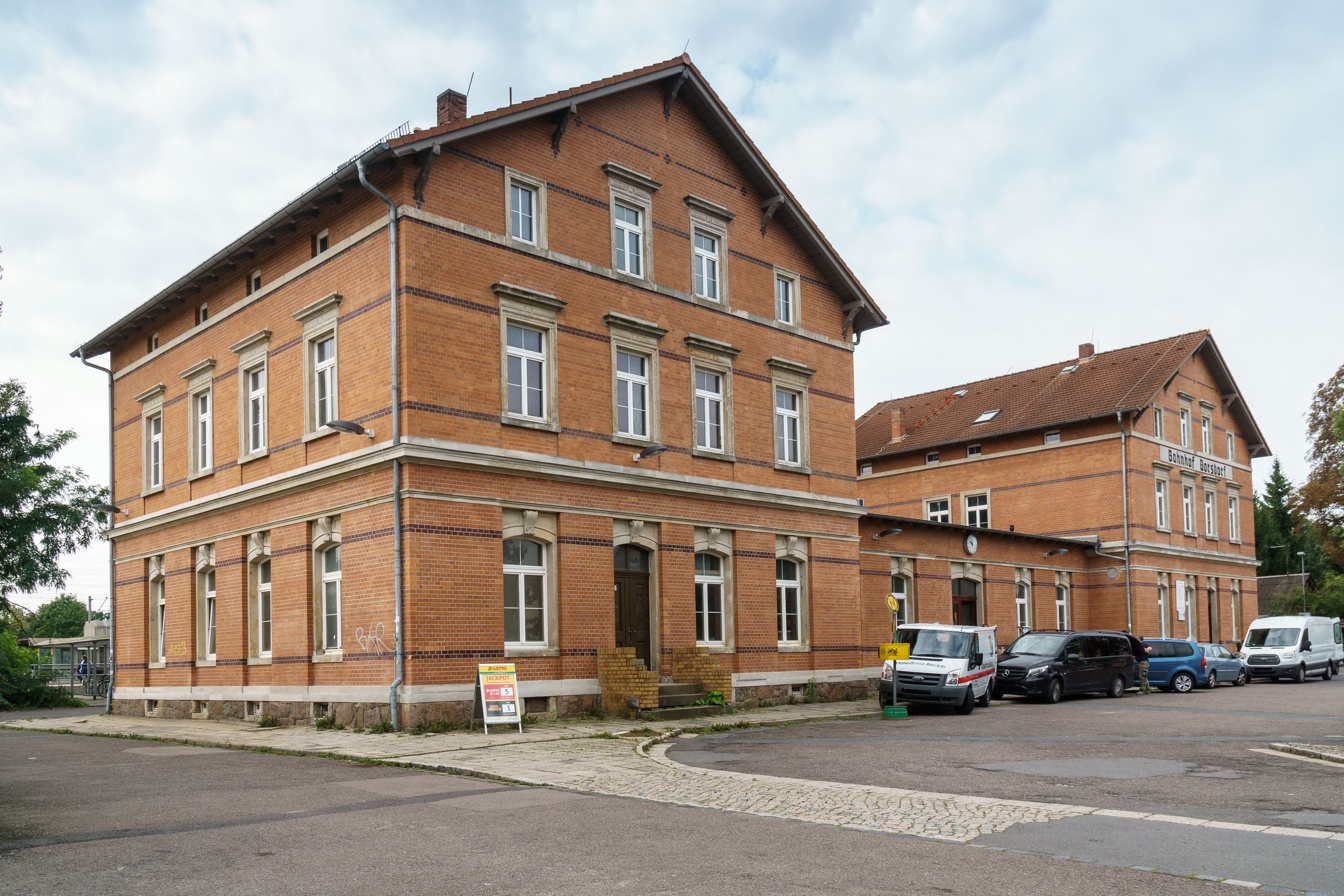
Borsdorf train station

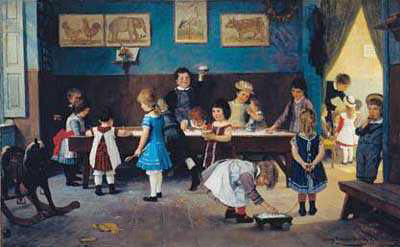
Im Kindergarten (In the kindergarten), by Hugo Oehmichen (b. 1843 in Borsdorf)

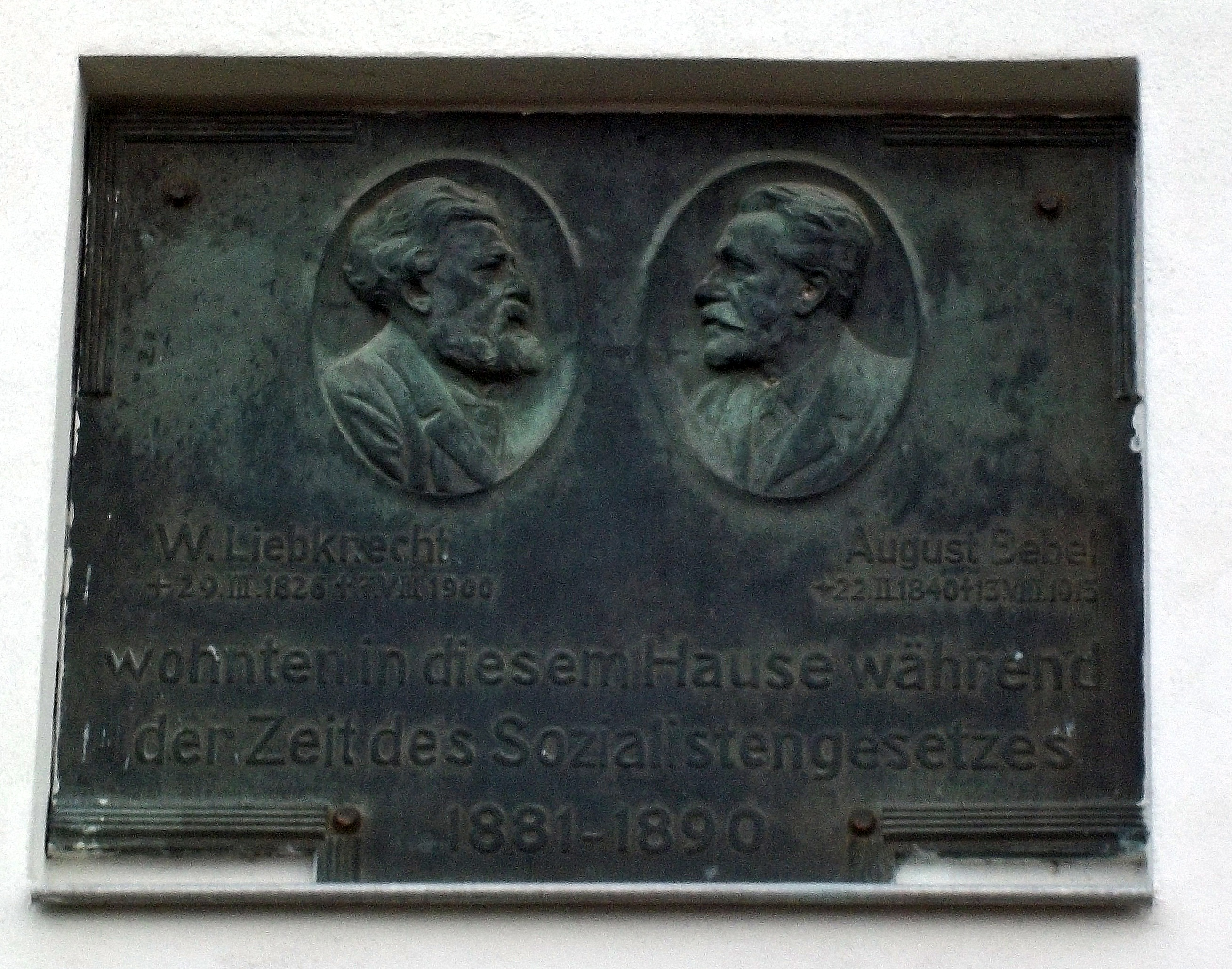
August Bebel and Wilhelm Liebknecht stayed in Borsdorf between 1881 and 1891 during the Anti-Socialist Laws, the picture shows a commemorative plate outside the villa building where they lived.

== Green Belt (Grüner Ring Leipzig) ==
Borsdorf is a member of 'Grüner Ring Leipzig' a coordination group of Leipzig and the surrounding municipalities. As part of this, the 'Grüner Ring' (green belt) bicycle round course is running through Borsdorf.

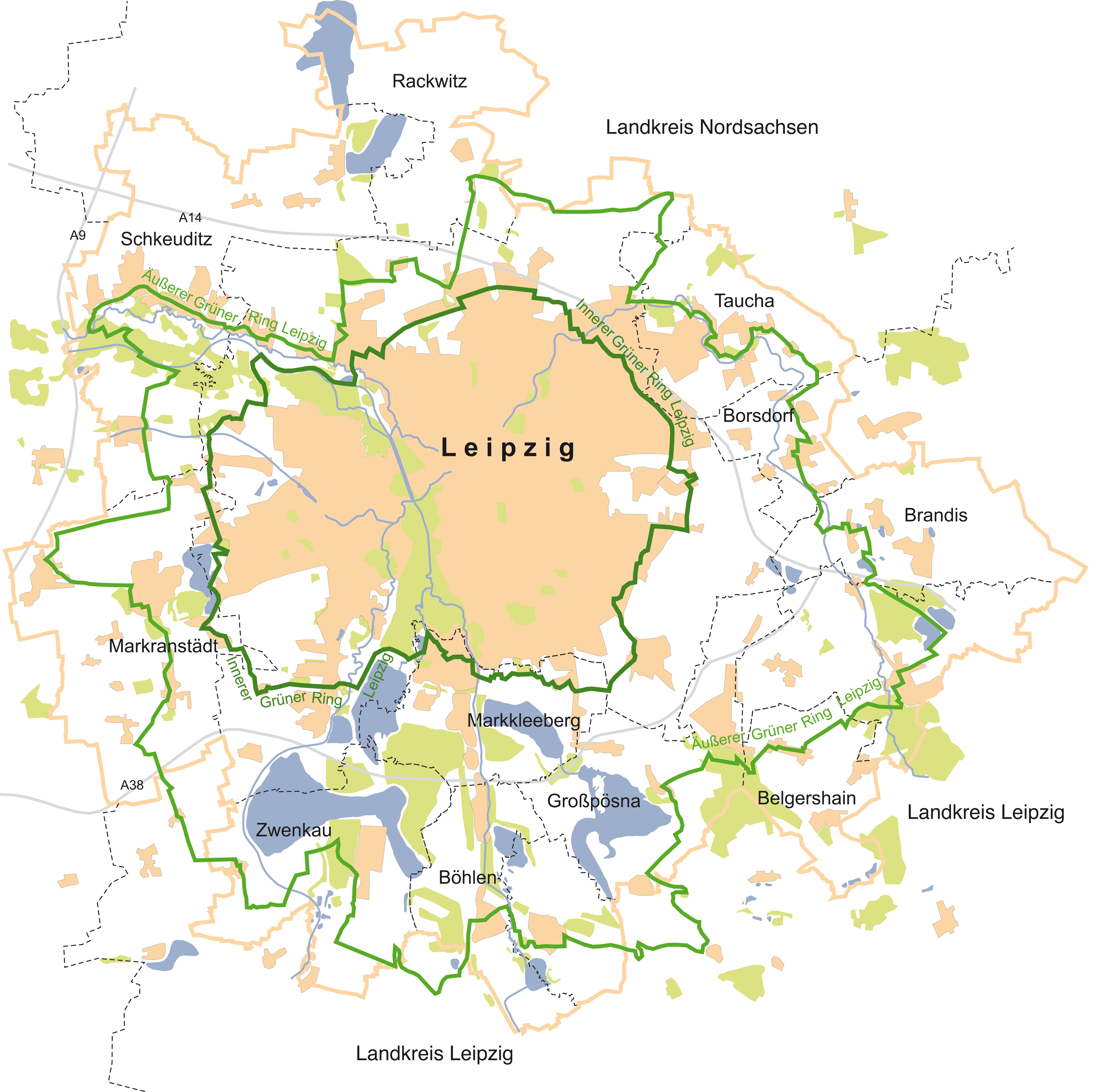
Green belt bicycle round course (dark green ='Inner Green Belt'; light green = 'Outer Green Belt')

== Notable residents ==
Albrecht Gehse (* 1955), Painter, member of the Leipzig School, known i.a. for his portrait of Helmut Kohl in the Federal German Chancellery building, Berlin

Sarah Klier (* 2. October 1990) was the last baby born in the GDR just two minutes before German reunification on midnight 2/3 October 1990.
