= Borsdorf (Sachs) station =

Railway station in Germany

Borsdorf (Sachs)
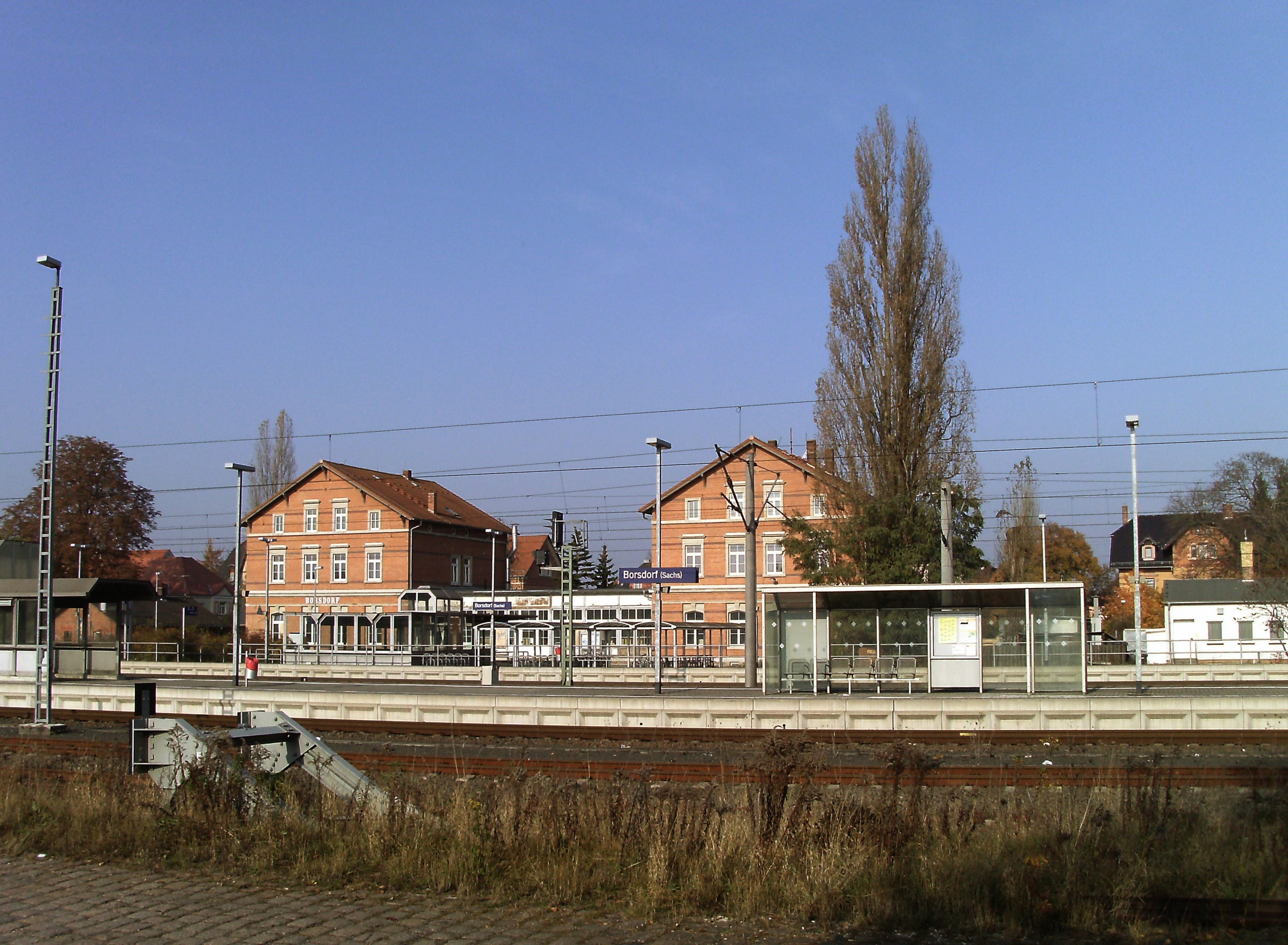
- 2011

General information
- Location: Bahnhofstraße 16; 04451 Borsdorf; Saxony; Germany
- Coordinates: 51.3456°N 12.5410°E
- System: Hp
- Owner: DB Netz
- Operator: DB Station&Service
- Lines: Leipzig–Dresden railway (KBS 500); Borsdorf–Coswig railway (KBS 506)
- Platforms: 1 island platform 1 side platform
- Tracks: 6
- Train operators: DB Regio Südost; Mitteldeutsche Regiobahn; S-Bahn Mitteldeutschland

Construction
- Parking: Yes
- Cycle facilities: Yes
- Accessible: yes

Other information
- Station code: 797
- DS100 code: LBOR
- IBNR: 8010059
- Category: 5
- Fare zone: MDV: 168
- Website: www.bahnhof.de

Services
Preceding station	DB Regio Südost	Following station
Leipzig-Engelsdorf towards Leipzig Hbf	RE 50	Wurzen towards Dresden Hbf
Preceding station	Mitteldeutsche Regiobahn	Following station
Leipzig-Engelsdorf towards Leipzig Hbf	RB 110	Beucha towards Döbeln Hbf
Preceding station	Mitteldeutschland S-Bahn	Following station
Leipzig-Engelsdorf towards Halle-Nietleben	S 3	Gerichshain towards Wurzen or Oschatz
Location
- Location within Saxony Location within Germany Location within Europe

Borsdorf (Sachs) station is a railway station in the municipality of Borsdorf, located in the Leipzig district in Saxony, Germany.
