= Lübschützer Teiche Stasi Bunker =

Museum near Leipzig, Germany

Coordinates: 51.3801°N 12.6447°E

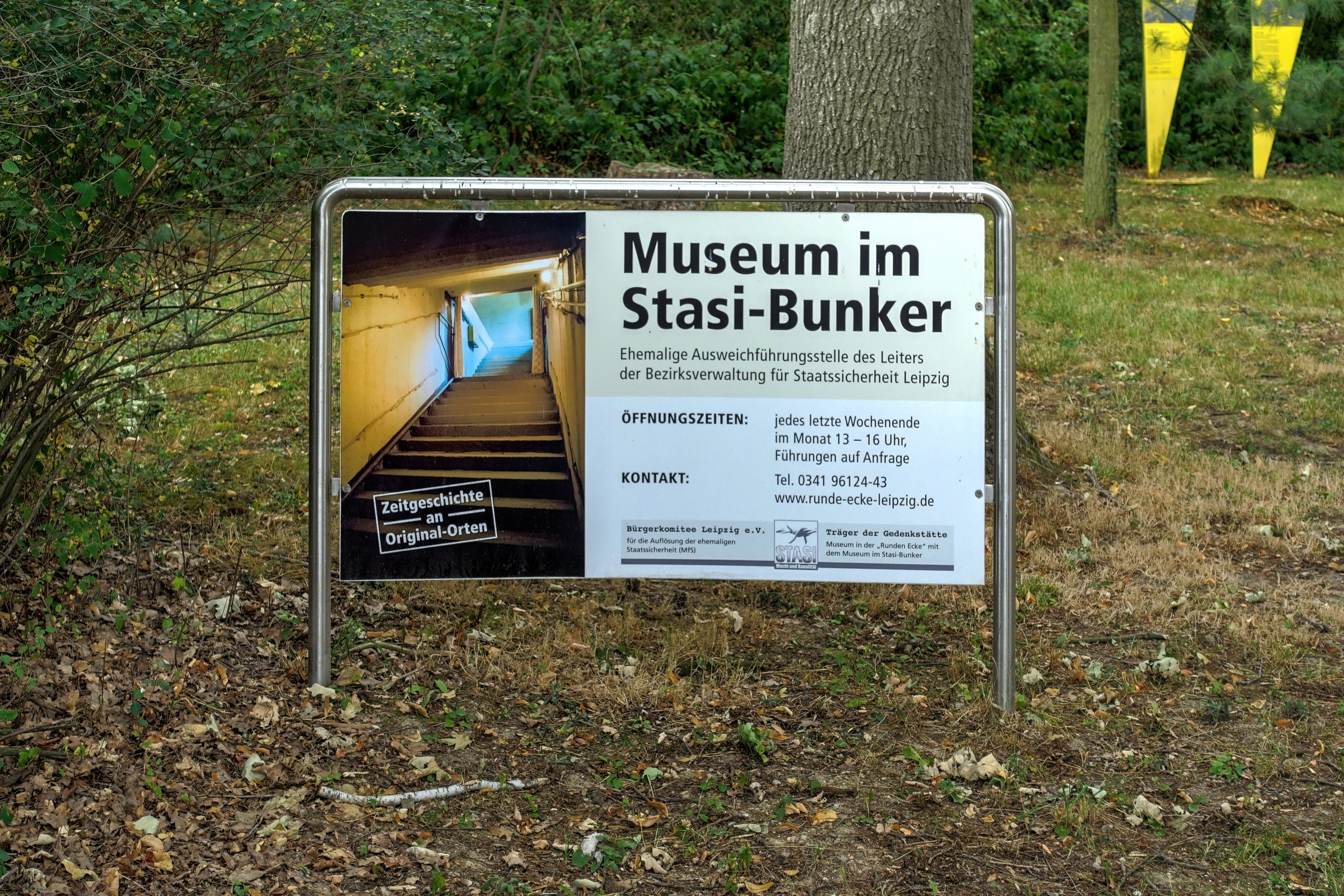
Sign directly behind the south entrance

The Lübschützer Teiche Bunker Complex, built 1968–1972, was designed to be an emergency command centre for the District Administration for State Security, Leipzig (part of the Ministry for State Security, also known as the Stasi) in the event of war or a nuclear attack. It was never used for its intended purpose.

== Location and structure ==
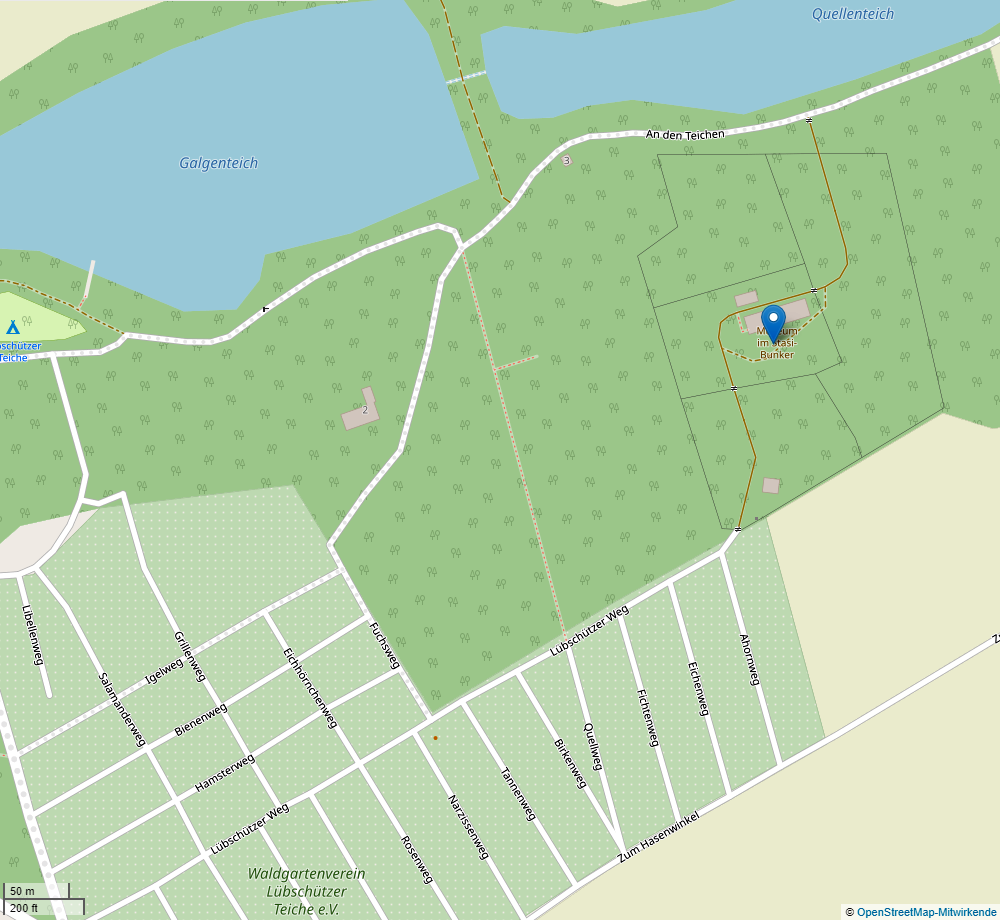
Location and structure of the complex near the Lübschützer Teichen

The facility is about 20 km (12.4 mi) east of Leipzig and about 3 km (1.9 mi) north of Machern. It is located at the northeast end of the "Lübschützer Teiche e.V." recreational area and was disguised as a holiday complex belonging to "VEB Water Supply and Sewage Treatment Leipzig".

The total area of the site is 5.2 ha (12.8 acres). The bunker buildings are approximately 15,000 m^{2} (161,458.7 sq ft).

The entire area was divided into an inner and an outer security zone and surrounded with chain-link fencing. The fences further divided the facility into three outer areas: north, east, and south. The commandant's bungalow was located in the south area, near the southern entrance. The east area had three bungalows, the middle of which was used by the commandant's deputy in his absence. These bungalows also served to disguise the grounds as a company holiday complex. Only specially qualified Stasi employees had access to the inner zone in which the actual bunker was located. The site was secured by a commandant at the rank of major, his deputy, and about six guards, as well as several dogs.

== Construction and camouflage of the camp ==
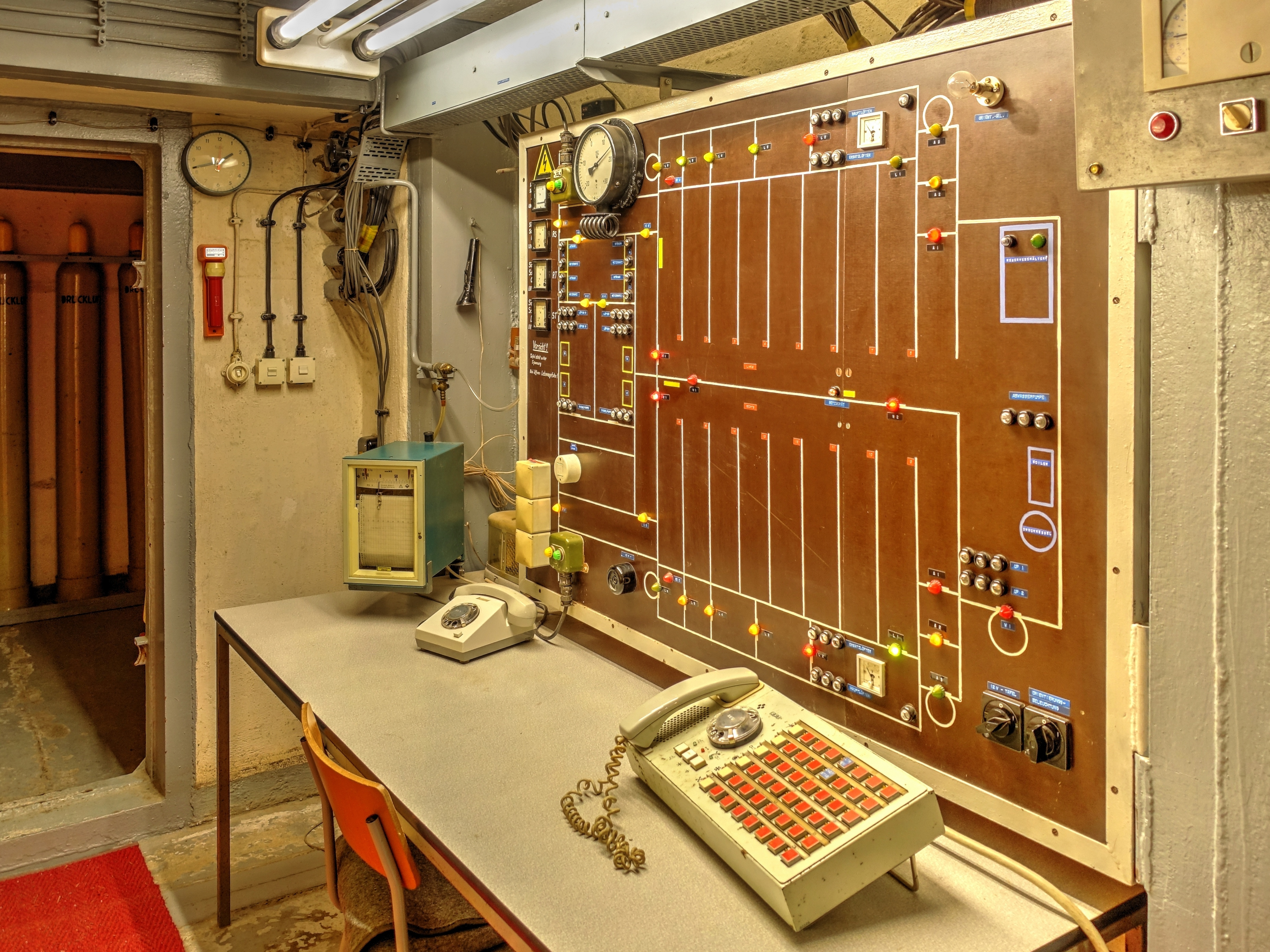
Board for monitoring the bunker's facilities

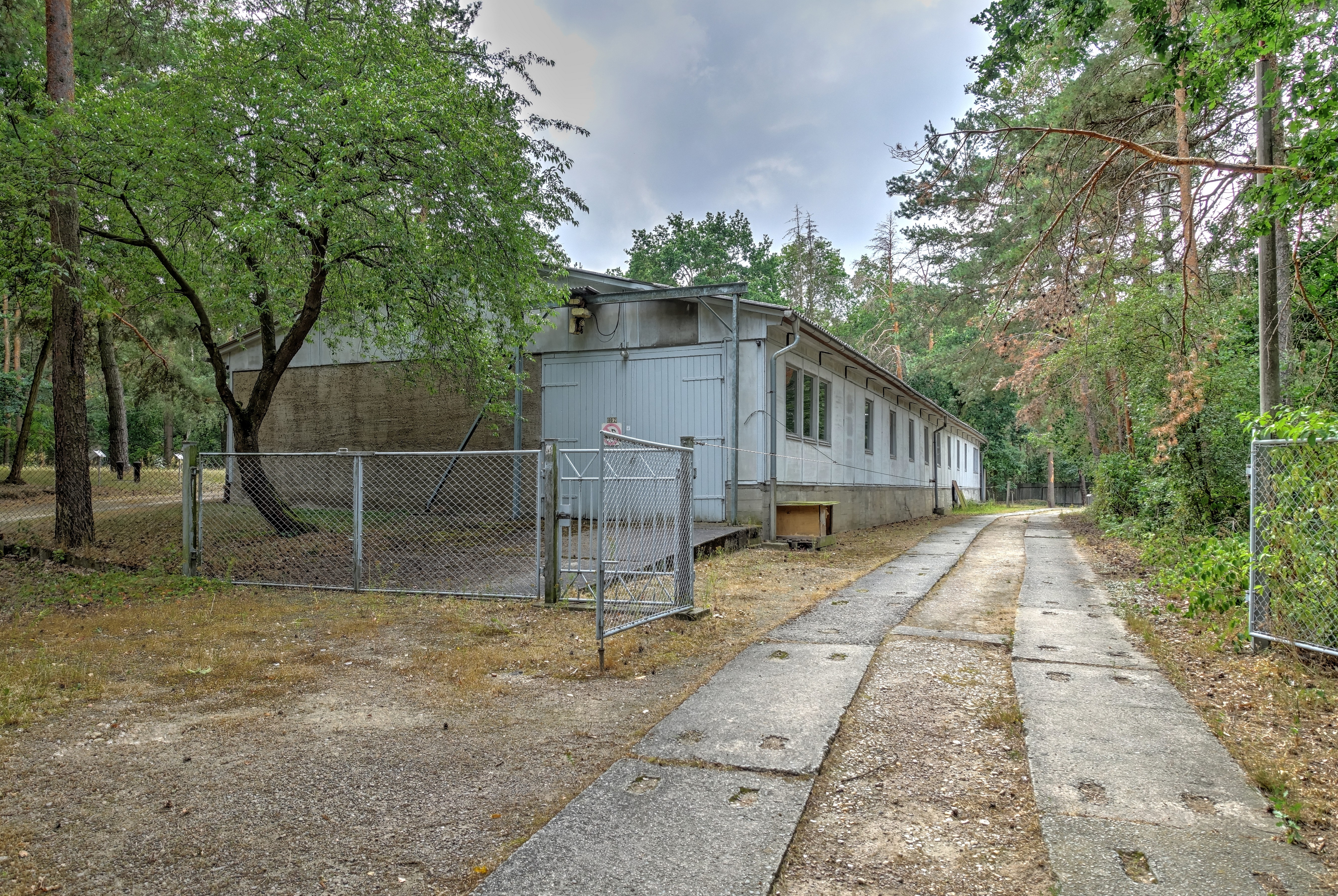
The "legending hall" from the east. To the right is the dog run.

The complex was designed for 100-120 full-time employees. The bunker itself was made of reinforced concrete and measured 35 m (114.8 ft) x 41 m (134.5 ft), at a depth of about 5 m (16.4 ft) to 6 m (19.7 ft). It was covered by about 2.5 m (8.2 ft) of earth. Access was by two staircases, one on the east side and one on the west, that could be closed off by solid panels. The "legending hall", a dummy building meant to disguise the entrance of the bunker, had two large wooden doors and was made of lightweight construction so that the bunker entrances would not be buried if the building was destroyed. The bunker contained working and sleeping rooms, sanitary facilities, a kitchen, and an infirmary, and had air filters, communications equipment, and emergency power generators with tanks for about 6000 litres of diesel fuel. The 16 total rooms were arranged in two rows of eight, with each room measuring approximately 2 m (6.6 ft) x 14 m (45.9 ft).

For radio communication, a transmitter was hidden in a smaller bunker about 3 km (1.9 mi) to the west, in Tresenwald near Gerichshain. This transmitter was placed there to prevent enemy reconnaissance from using radio direction finding to locate the main bunker complex. It was camouflaged with two bungalows, which were supposedly a vacation property of the Council of the District of Leipzig, and could be remotely operated from the main bunker. In case the remote transmitter was destroyed, the complex maintained an emergency transmitter in the bunker itself with an antenna on the grounds.

Since the facility was built under strict secrecy, no civilian employees were allowed on the site. The only exception was for the construction of two wells in the inner zone, which were drilled by a civilian company before the bunker was built in 1968, since the Stasi did not have the necessary specialists. All other work was done by the Stasi employees themselves. For this purpose the complex contained a carpentry shop and an electrical workshop, and there was a locksmith's in the main building. These outbuildings, along with a garage complex and a dog kennel, served to camouflage the bunker, which had no outer zone to the west to hide it. In addition, privacy fencing was placed at the west entrance of the "legending hall". The main function of this building was to camouflage the bunker from western satellite reconnaissance. It was also used to store mobilization reserves. Both entrances to the building were secured by a guard dog on a dog run.

== Discovery and current use ==
The bunker was not discovered until December 1989. Today, the site is part of the "Runde Ecke" Memorial Museum in Leipzig and is operated by the Citizens' Committee. Visitors can see the preserved buildings and the interior furnishings, some of which are original and some of which were sourced from other Stasi bunkers. This includes some of the period communications technology, but not the encryption technology, which was dismantled by Soviet officers. In 1995, the Citizens' Committee succeeded in attaining historical monument protection status for the entire complex.

There are several accompanying exhibitions on the site. For example, near the south entrance, next to the commandant's house, are 11 information boards commemorating the Peaceful Revolution of 1989. There are about 30 weather-resistant information boards permanently installed on the site that explain the function of individual buildings and facilities.

== Gallery ==
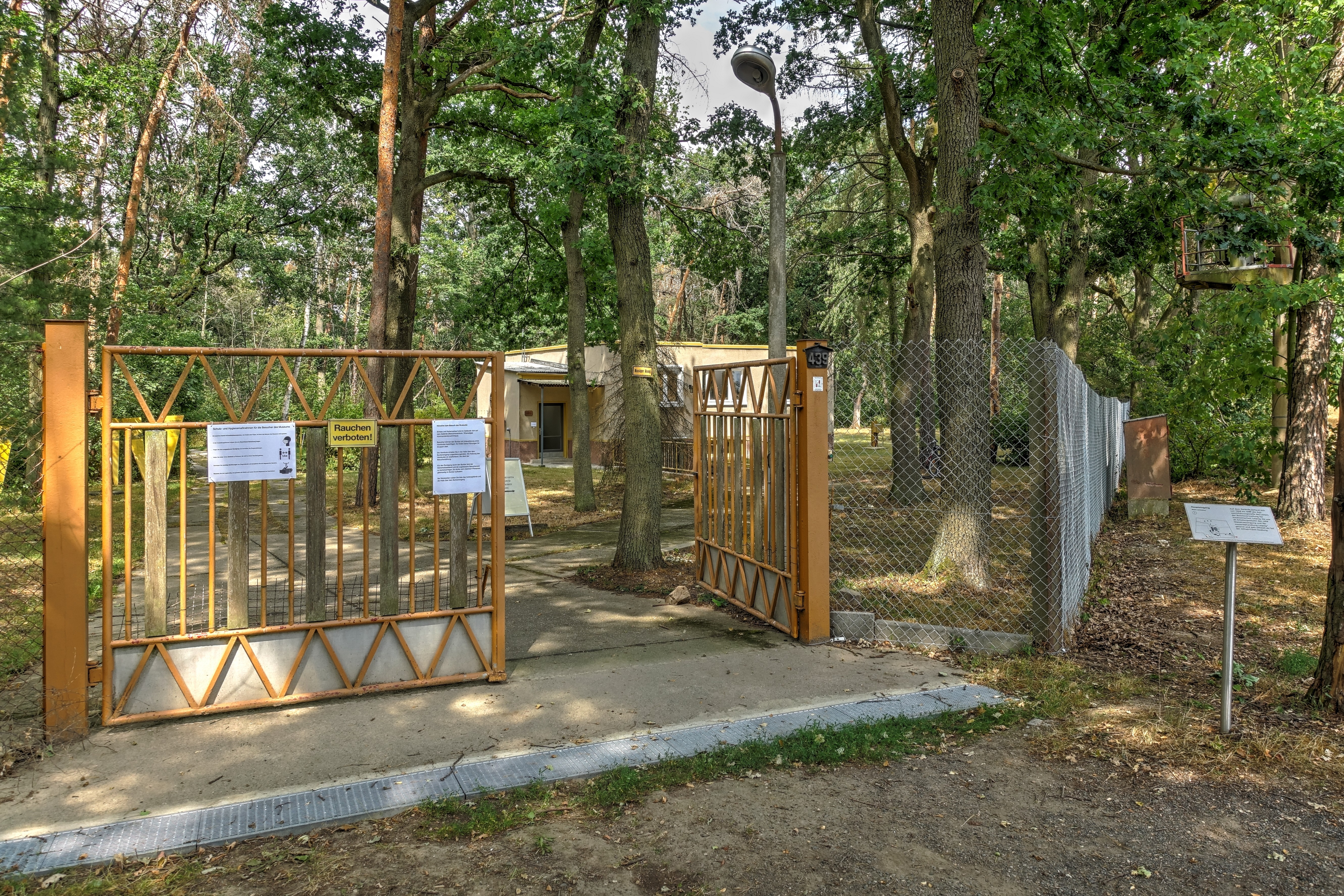
Main entrance on the south side of the site

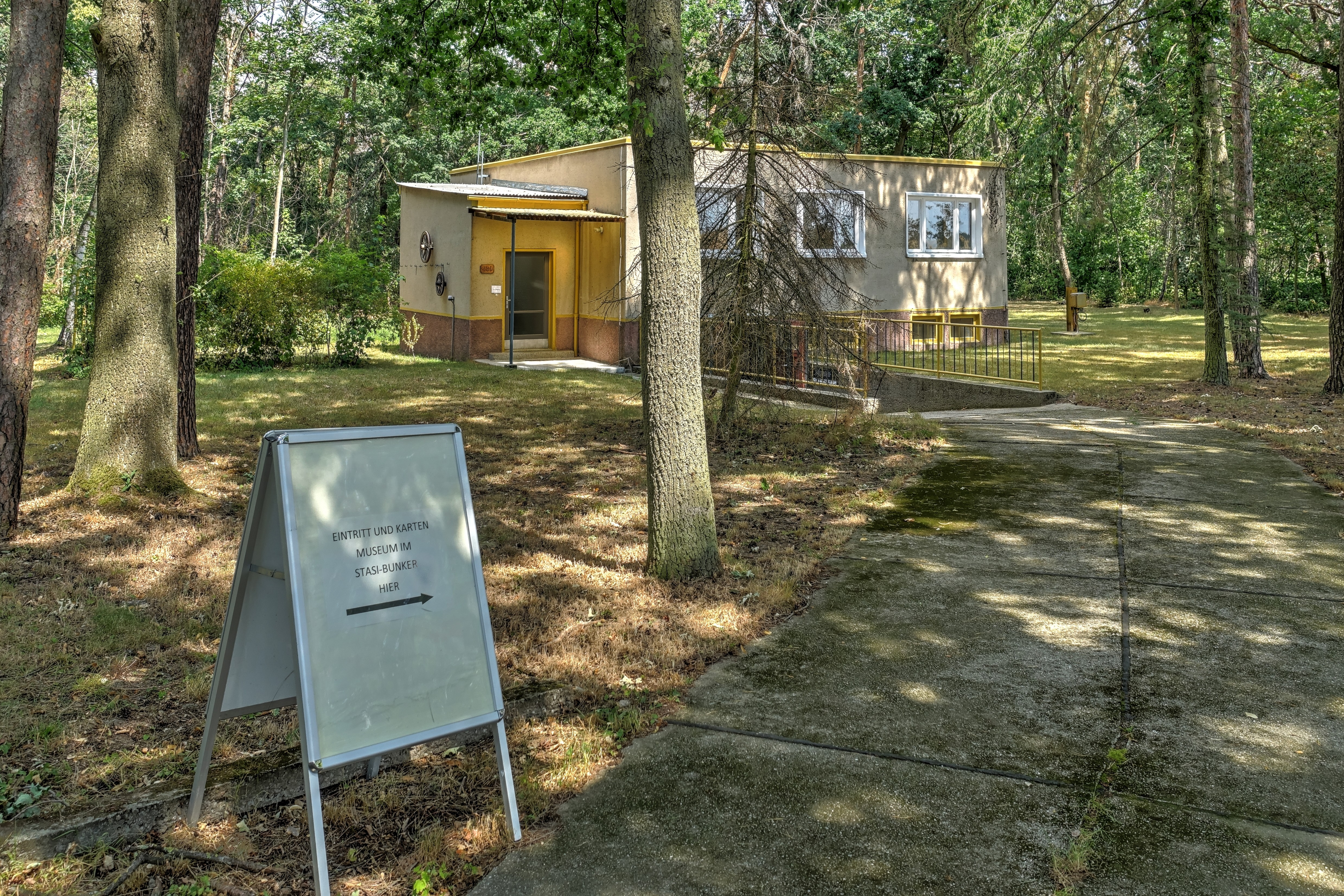
Commandant's bungalow near the south entrance

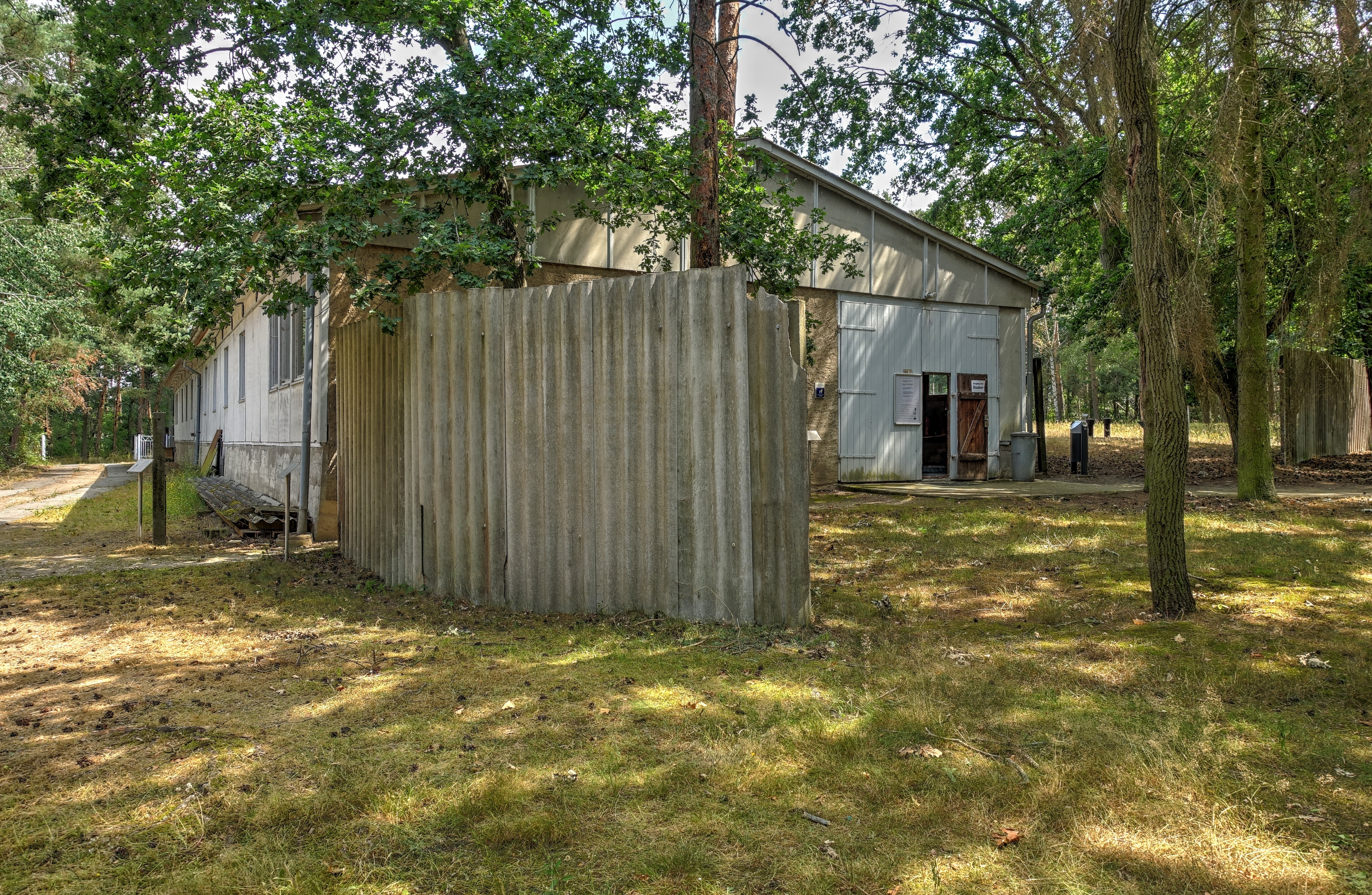
"Legending hall" from the west, with privacy fencing

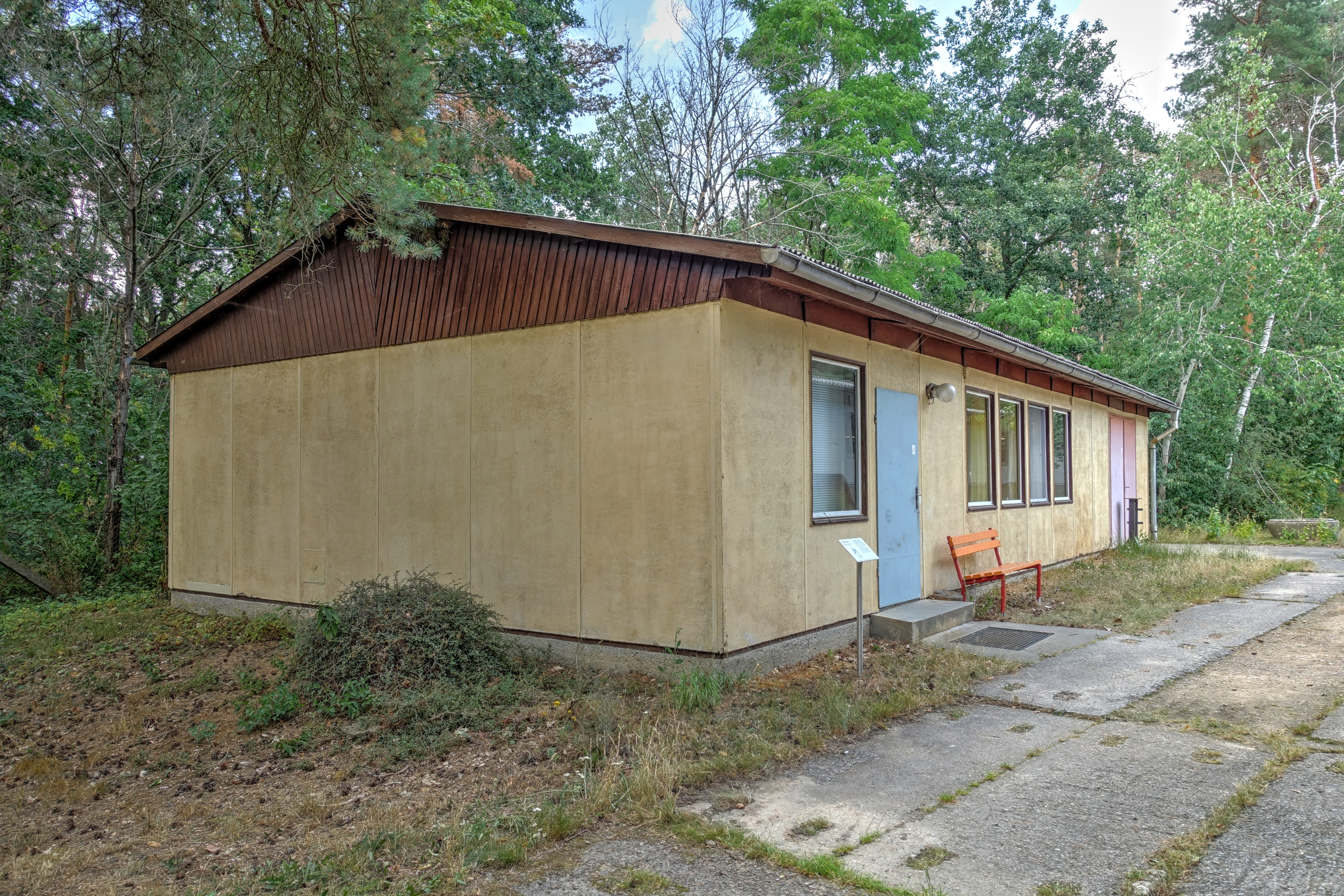
Social building and electrical workshop north of the main hall

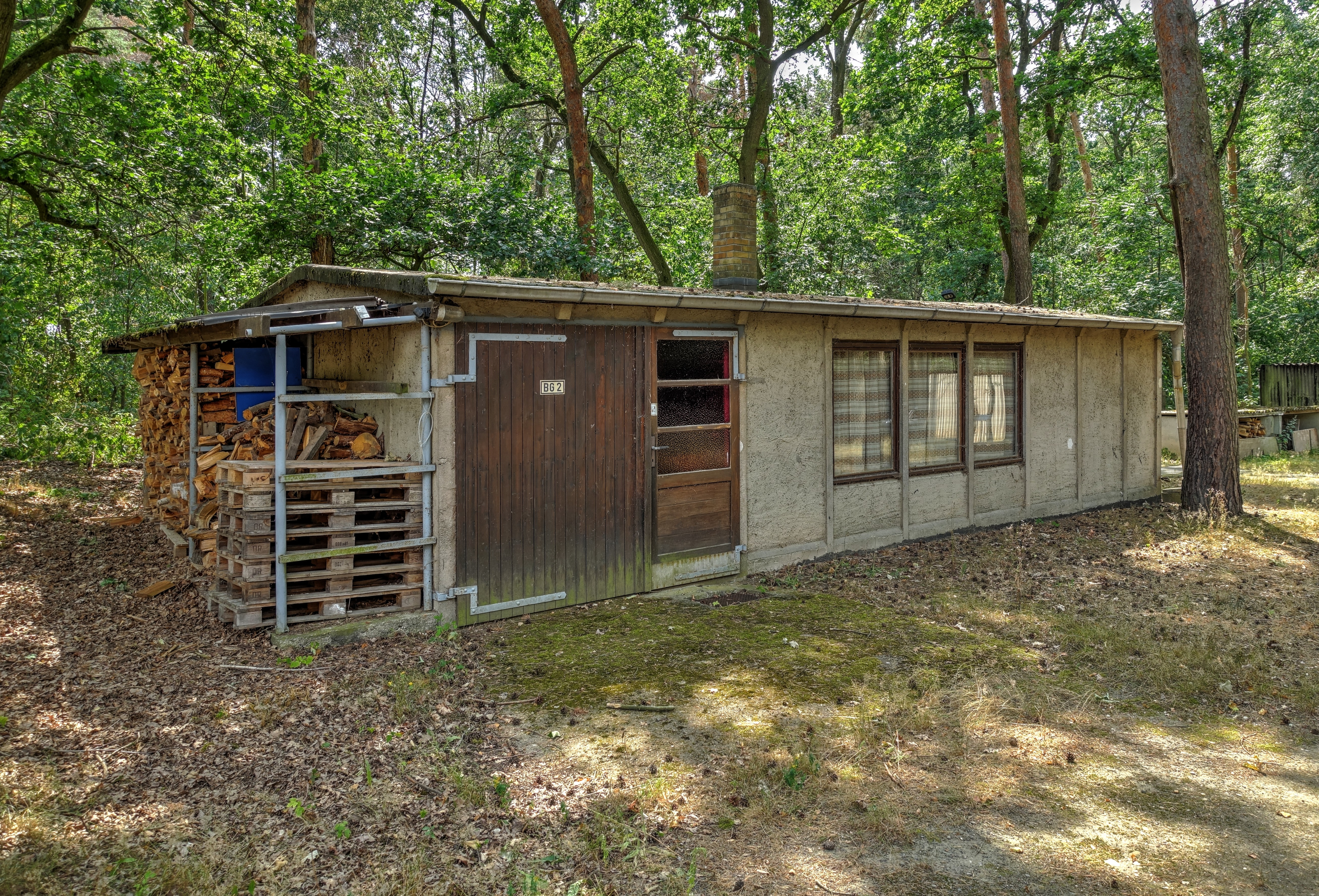
Carpentry workshop, south of the main building

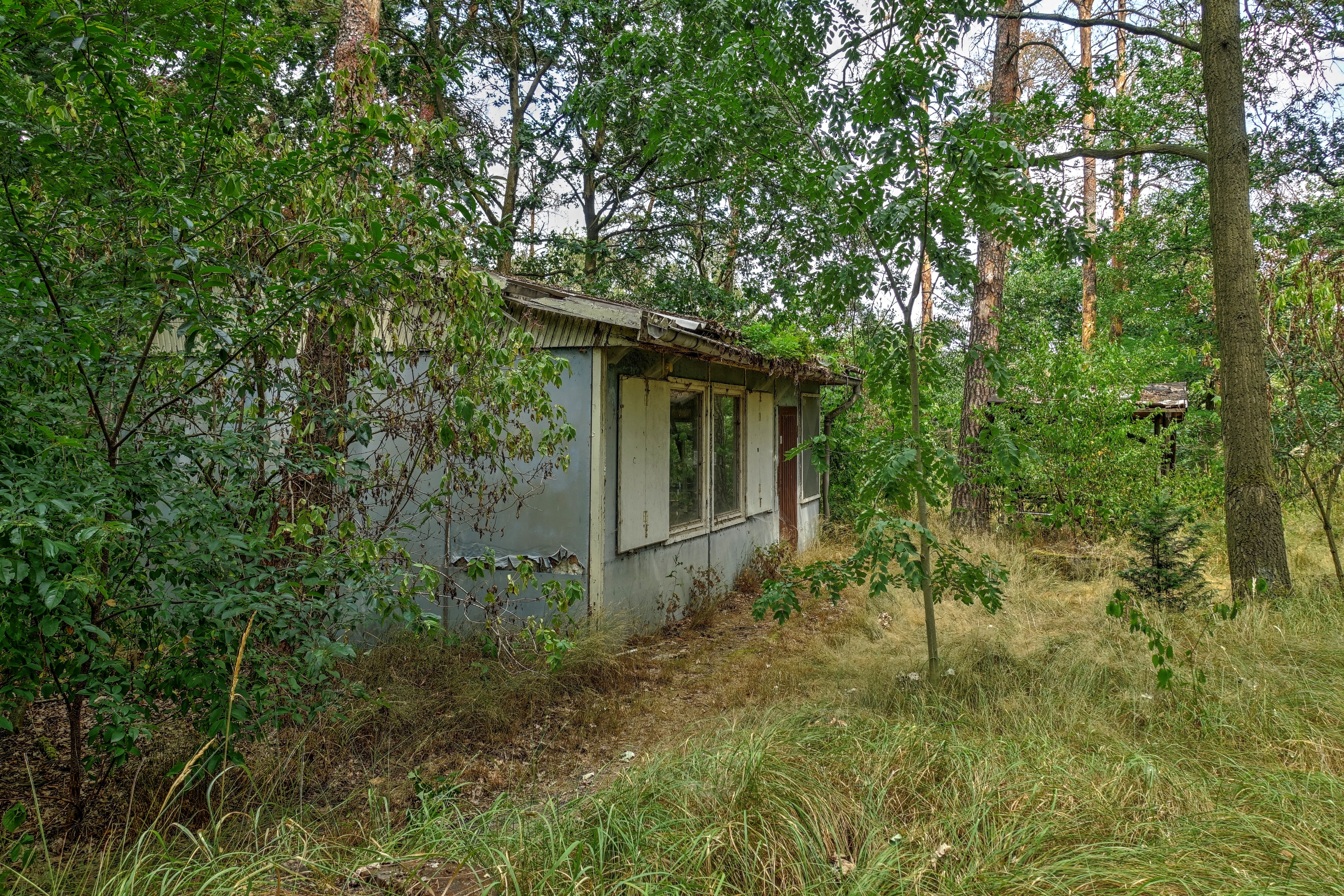
Bungalow in the outer zone, which among other purposes served as camouflage

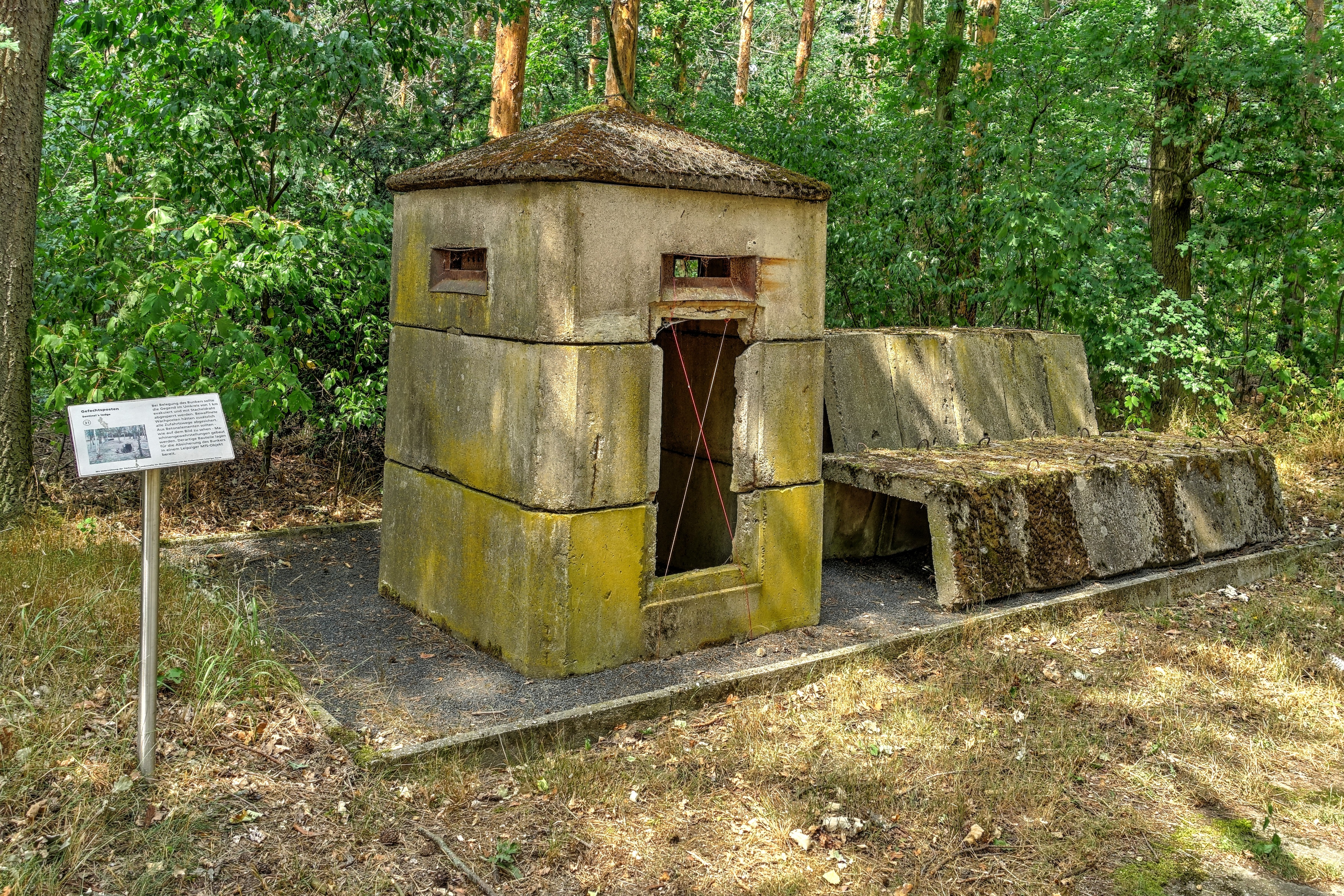
Combat posts were built to secure access in the event of an emergency

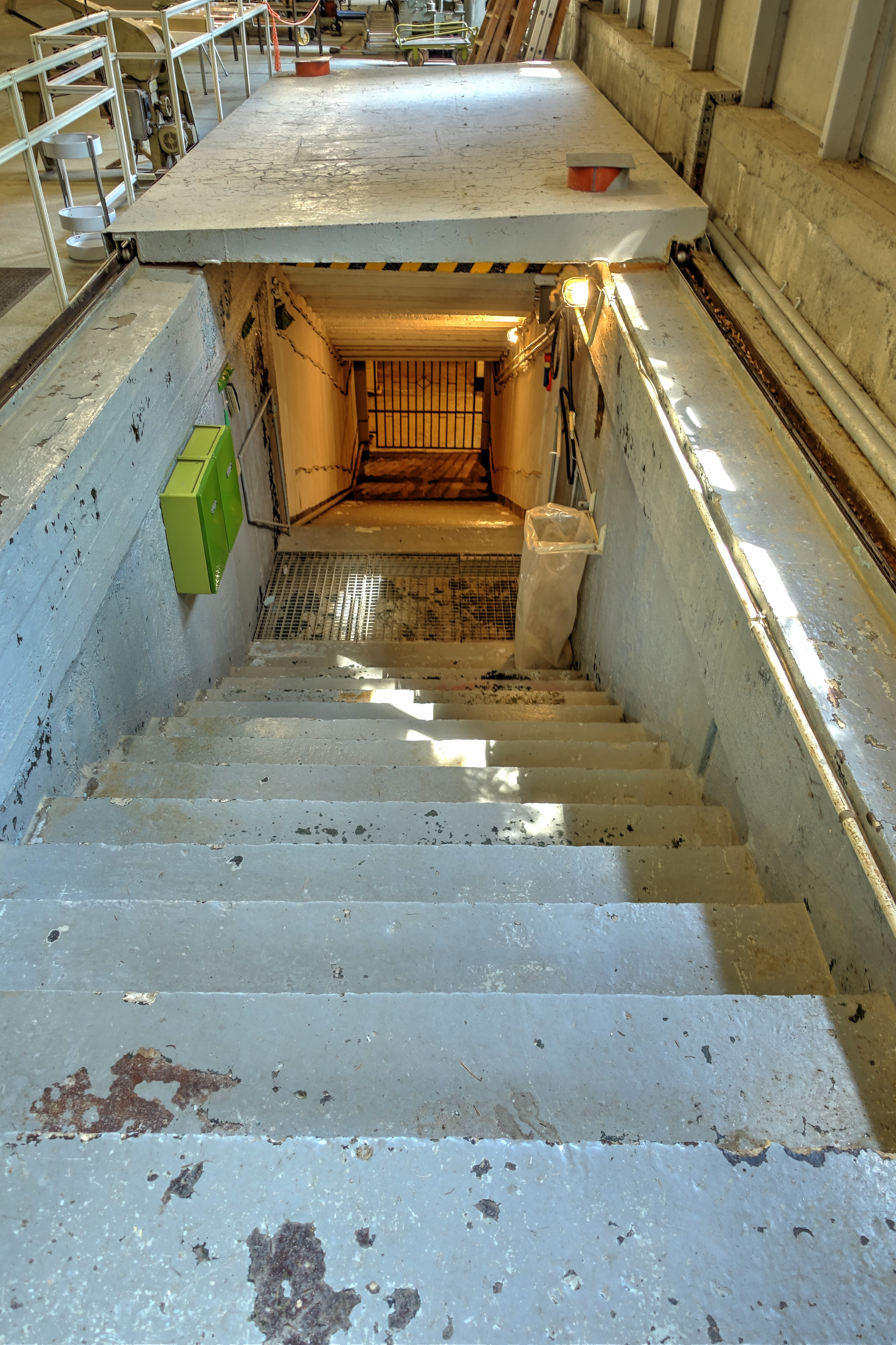
West entrance of the bunker

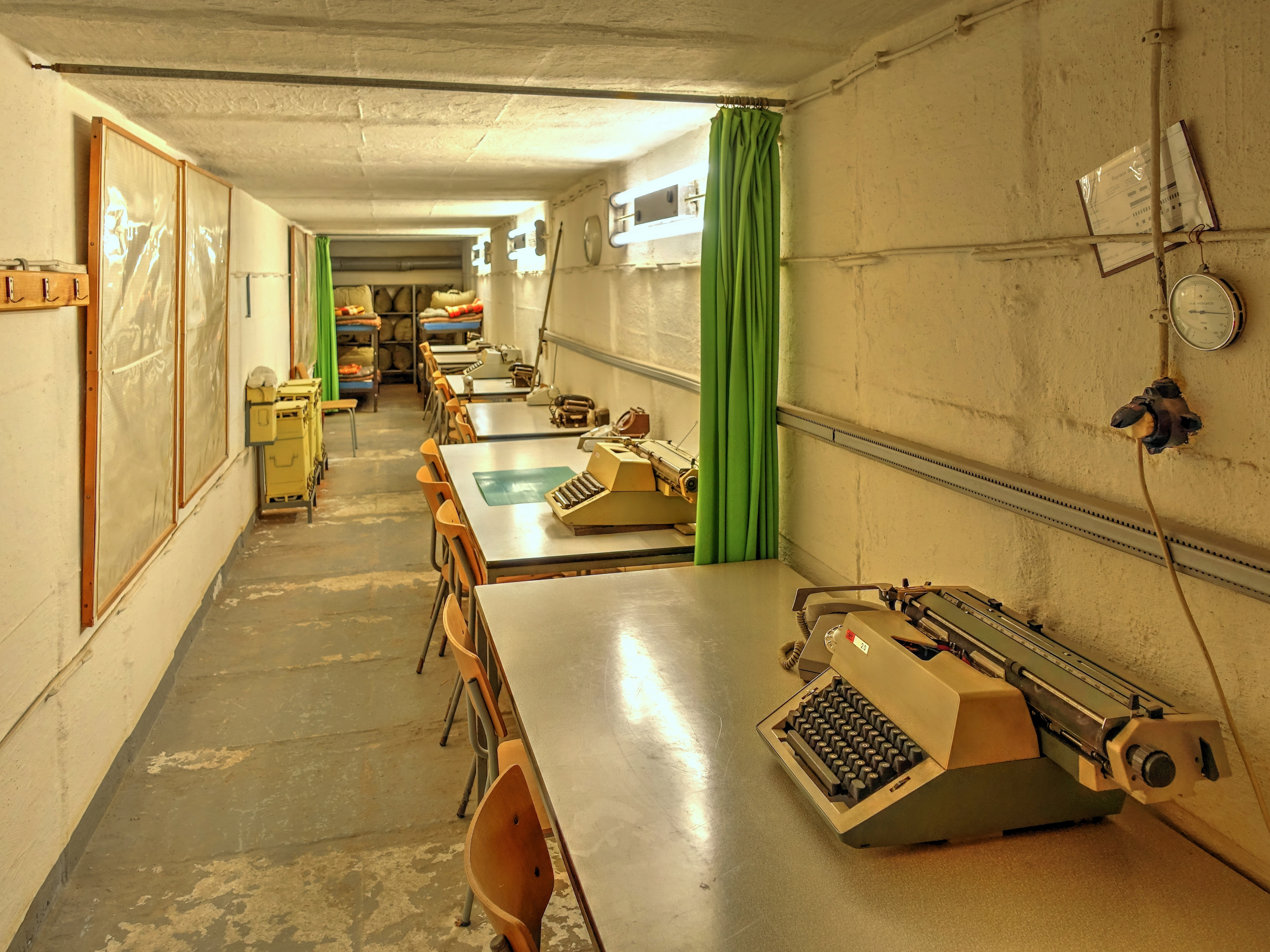
One of the workrooms

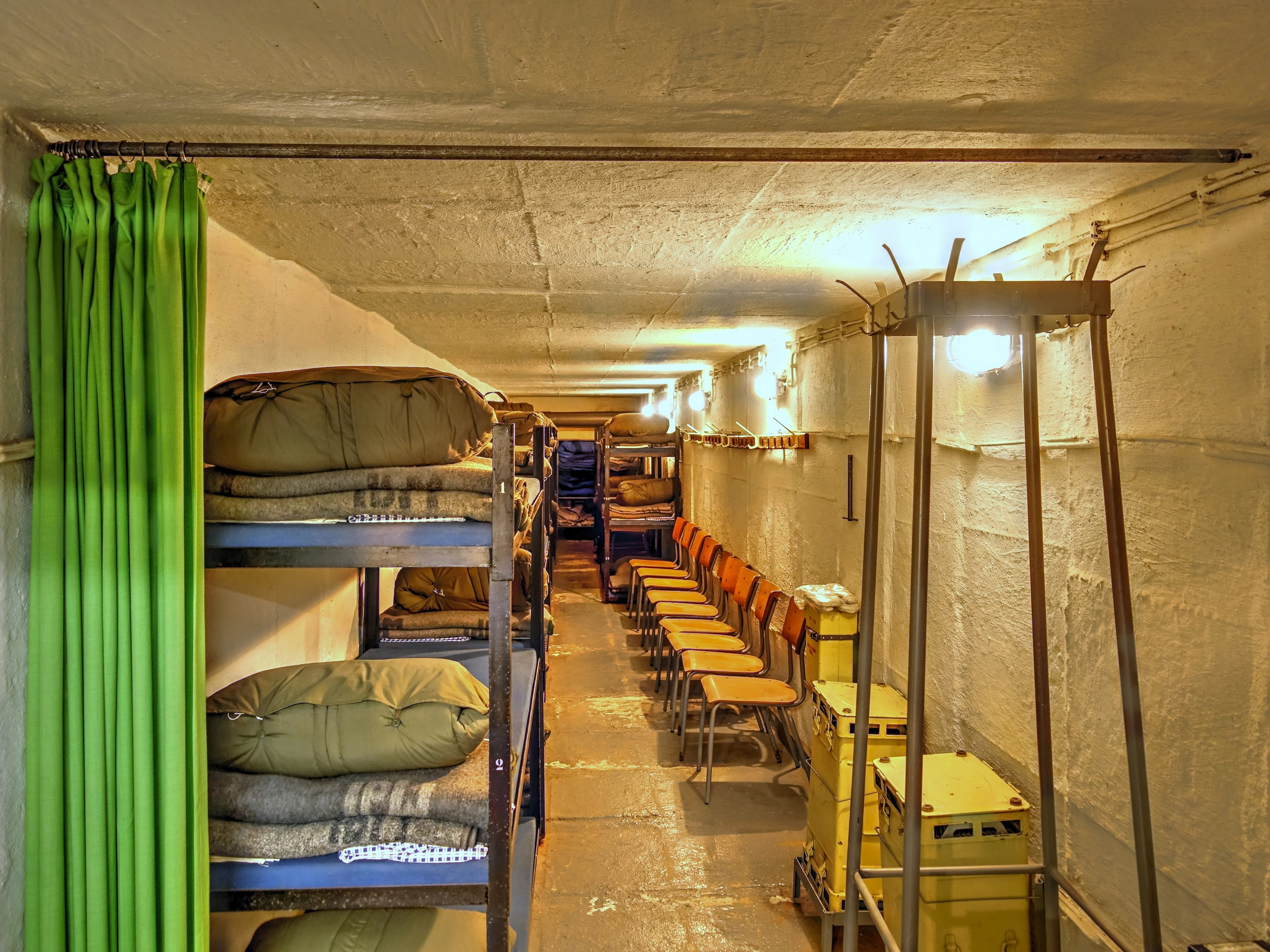
Sleeping room with 24 beds

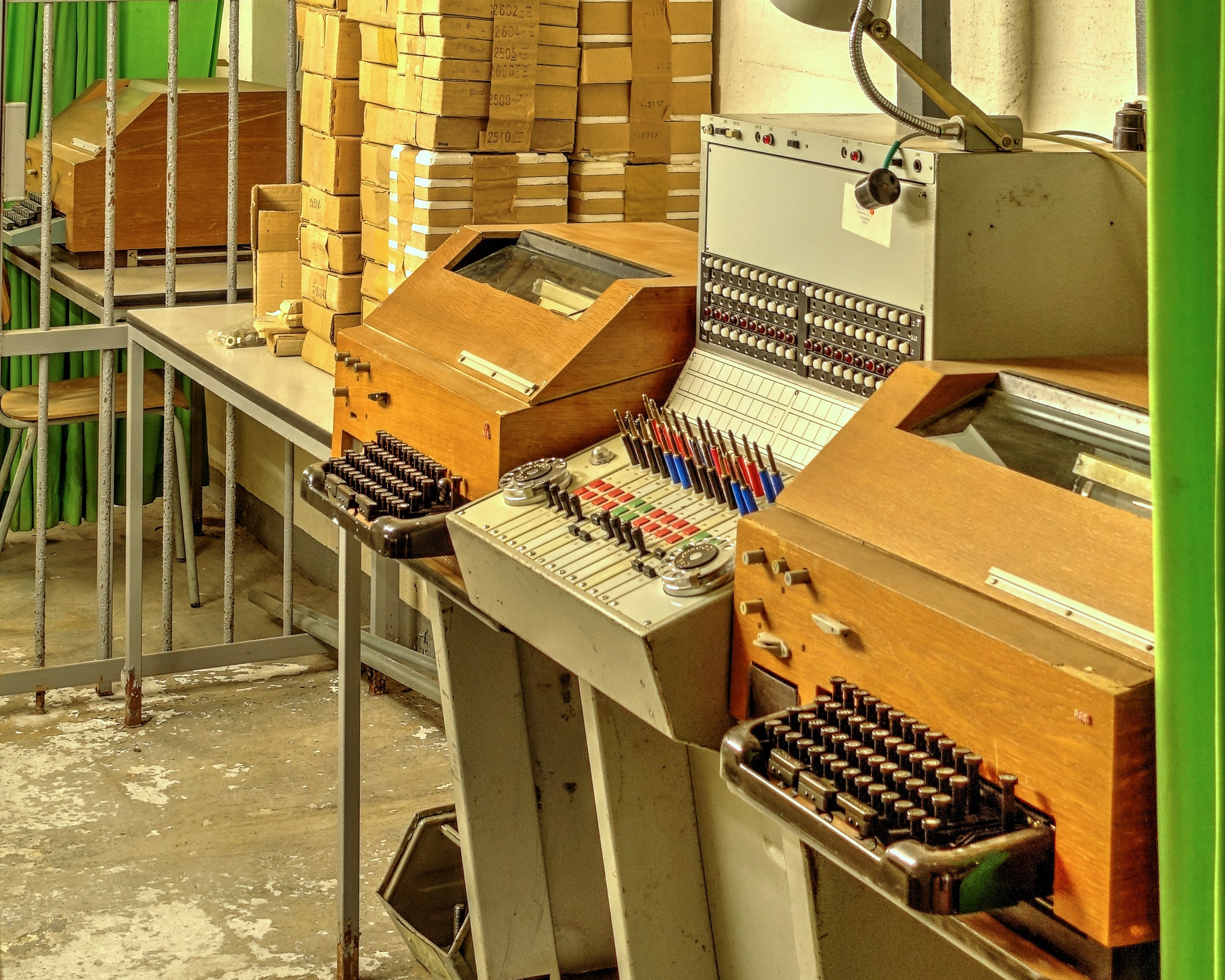
The then state-of-the-art teleprinters
