= Wurzen station =

Railway station in Wurzen, Germany

Wurzen
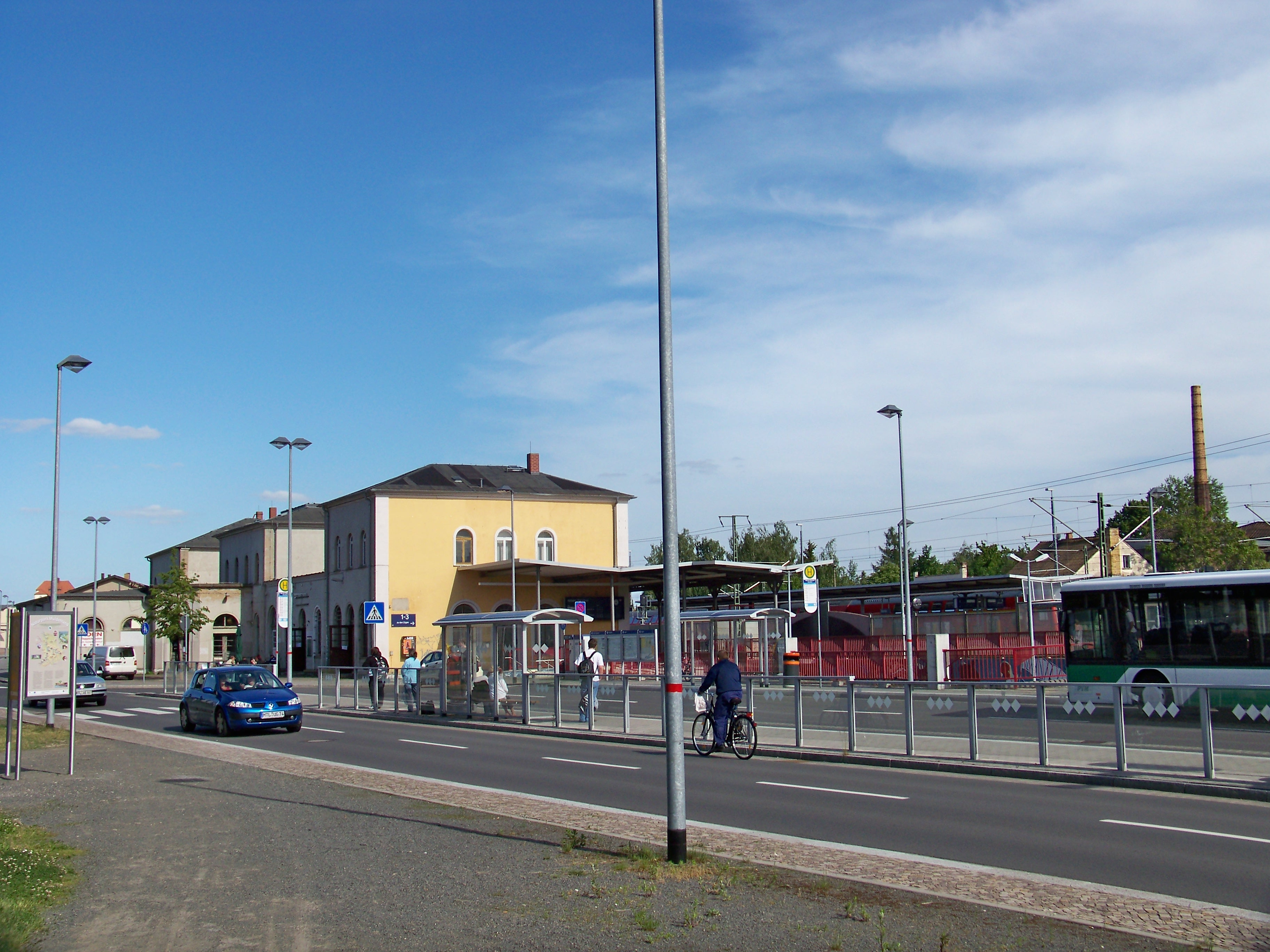
- Wurzen station in 2009 with the bus station in the foreground, railway tracks are just behind

General information
- Location: Am Bahnhof 3, 04808 Wurzen; Saxony, Germany
- Coordinates: 51.3644309°N 12.7386899°E
- Line: Leipzig–Dresden railway
- Platforms: 2
- Tracks: 3

Other information
- Station code: 6950
- DS100 code: LWZ
- Category: 4
- Fare zone: MDV: 142
- Website: www.bahnhof.de

Services
Preceding station	DB Regio Südost	Following station
Borsdorf (Sachs) towards Leipzig Hbf	RE 50	Kühren towards Dresden Hbf
Preceding station	Mitteldeutschland S-Bahn	Following station
Bennewitz towards Halle-Nietleben	S 3	Kühren towards Wurzen or Oschatz
Location

Wurzen railway station (German: Bahnhof Wurzen) is a railway station in Wurzen, Saxony, Germany. The station is located on the Leipzig–Dresden line and operated by DB Station&Service.

== Services ==
=== Railway services ===
As of March 2017, DB Regio and S-Bahn Mitteldeutschland services call at the station.

RE 50 operates hourly, S3 every 30 minutes.

=== Local transport ===
City bus lines A and B as well as many regional bus lines frequently stop at this station. The bus station is located near the railway station.
