= Machern =

- Municipality
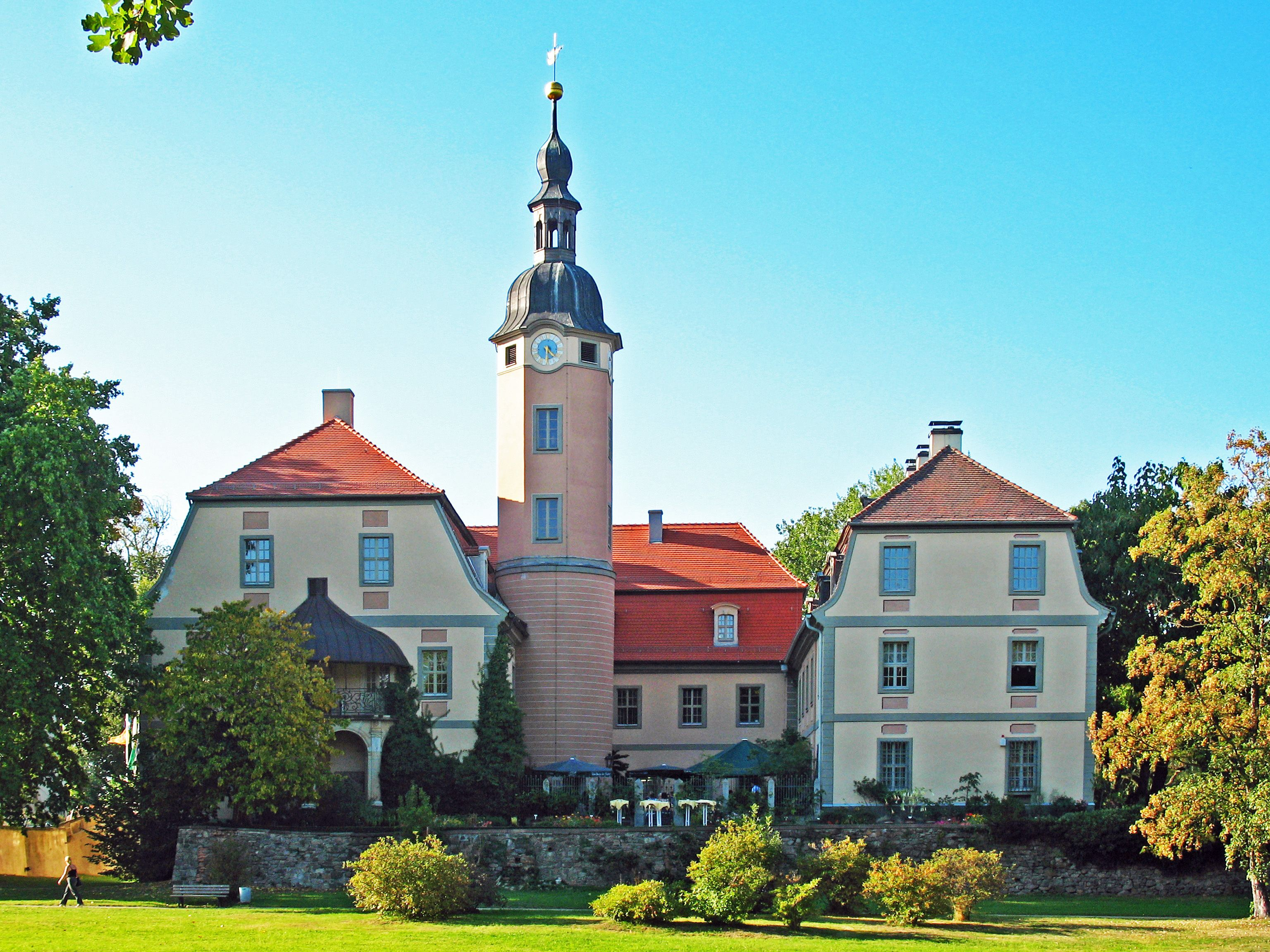
- View of Machern Castle from the east

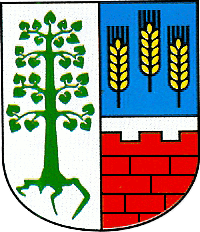
- Coat of arms

- Location of Machern within Leipzig district
- Interactive map of Machern
- Location within Germany Location within Saxony
- Coordinates: 51°21′30″N 12°37′40″E
- Country: Germany
- State: Saxony
- District: Leipzig

Government
  - Mayor (2020–27): Karsten Frosch (CDU)

Area
  - Total: 38.87 km^{2} (15.01 sq mi)
- Elevation: 135 m (443 ft)

Population (2025-12-31)
  - Total: 6,586
  - Density: 169.4/km^{2} (438.8/sq mi)
- Time zone: UTC+01:00 (CET)
  - Summer (DST): UTC+02:00 (CEST)
- Postal codes: 04827
- Dialling codes: 034292
- Vehicle registration: L
- Website: www.gemeinde-machern.de

Machern (German pronunciation: [ˈmaxɐn]) is a municipality in the Leipzig district in Saxony, Germany. It is in the vicinity of the city of Leipzig.

== Geography ==
Machern lies 20 km east of Leipzig, about 10 km west of Wurzen over the river Mulde. The Leipzig-Riesa-Dresden railway line runs through the town, as does the B 6.

Machern is approximately 12 km south of Eilenburg, which can be reached with the B 107.

The divisions of the municipality are Machern, Gerichshain with Posthausen, and Püchau with Dögnitz (first historic mention 1313), Lübschütz und Plagwitz.

== Culture ==
There is a museum located in the Lübschützer Teiche Stasi Bunker about 3 km north of Machern. The bunker was designed as a refuge for Stasi employees from Leipzig in the event of nuclear war or similar catastrophe.

Machern castle (Schloss Machern) was a manor house of the local nobility. Adjacent to the castle there is an English-style landscape park which dates back to the 18th century.

Another manor house is located at Püchau, a formerly independent village which is now administered by Machern. Püchau Estate is notable for its English Tudor Revival Style. It is still owned privately and regularly hosts cultural events.

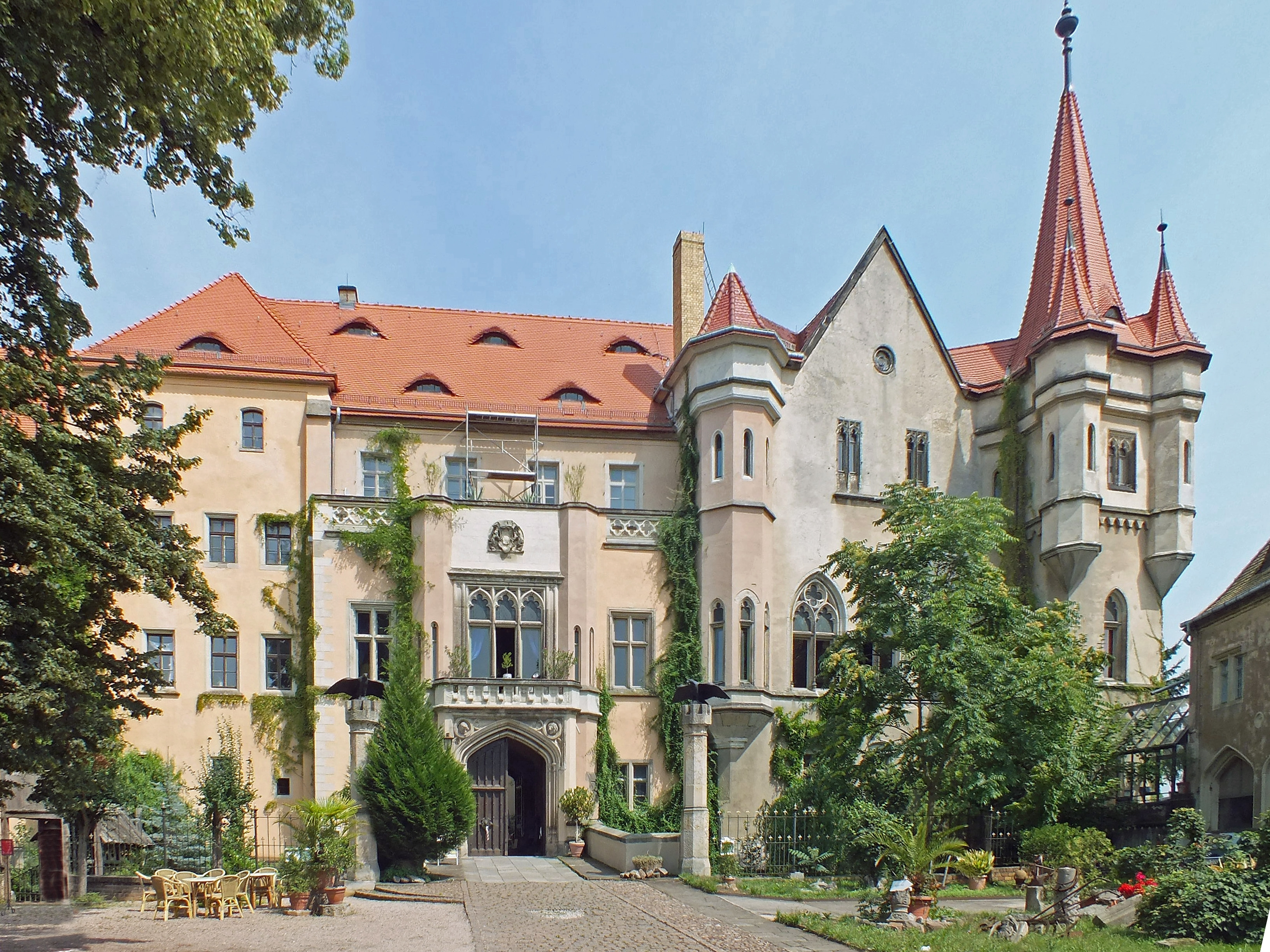
Schloss Püchau 2014

There is a golf course located north of the village center.
