= Schöppenstedt (Samtgemeinde) =

Coordinates: 52.13°N 10.78°E

Schöppenstedt is a former Samtgemeinde ("collective municipality") in the district of Wolfenbüttel, in Lower Saxony, Germany. Its seat was in the town Schöppenstedt. On 1 January 2015 it merged with the Samtgemeinde Asse to form the new Samtgemeinde Elm-Asse.

The Samtgemeinde Schöppenstedt consisted of the following municipalities:

1. Dahlum
2. Kneitlingen
3. Schöppenstedt
4. Uehrde
5. Vahlberg
6. Winnigstedt
