= Asse (Samtgemeinde) =

- Samtgemeinde
- Interactive map of Asse
- Location within Germany Location within Lower Saxony
- Coordinates: 52°06′39″N 10°40′38″E
- Country: Germany
- State: Lower Saxony
- District: Wolfenbüttel
- Disbanded: 1 January 2015
- Subdivisions: 7 municipalities

Area
  - Total: 86.63 km^{2} (33.45 sq mi)
- Elevation: 136 m (446 ft)

Population (2013-12-31)
  - Total: 9,337
  - Density: 107.8/km^{2} (279.1/sq mi)
- Time zone: UTC+01:00 (CET)
  - Summer (DST): UTC+02:00 (CEST)
- Postal codes: 38319
- Dialling codes: 05336
- Vehicle registration: WF
- Website: "www.samtgemeinde-asse.de". Archived from the original on 2014-07-20.

Asse is a former Samtgemeinde ("collective municipality") in the district of Wolfenbüttel, in Lower Saxony, Germany. It is situated approximately 10 km southeast of Wolfenbüttel. On 1 January 2015 it merged with the Samtgemeinde Schöppenstedt to form the new Samtgemeinde Elm-Asse.

It is named after the Asse, a small chain of hills in the municipality. Its seat was in the village Remlingen.

== Municipalities ==
The Samtgemeinde Asse consisted of the following municipalities:

- Denkte
- Hedeper
- Kissenbrück
- Remlingen
- Roklum
- Semmenstedt
- Wittmar
