= Brunswick Land =

Historical region in Germany

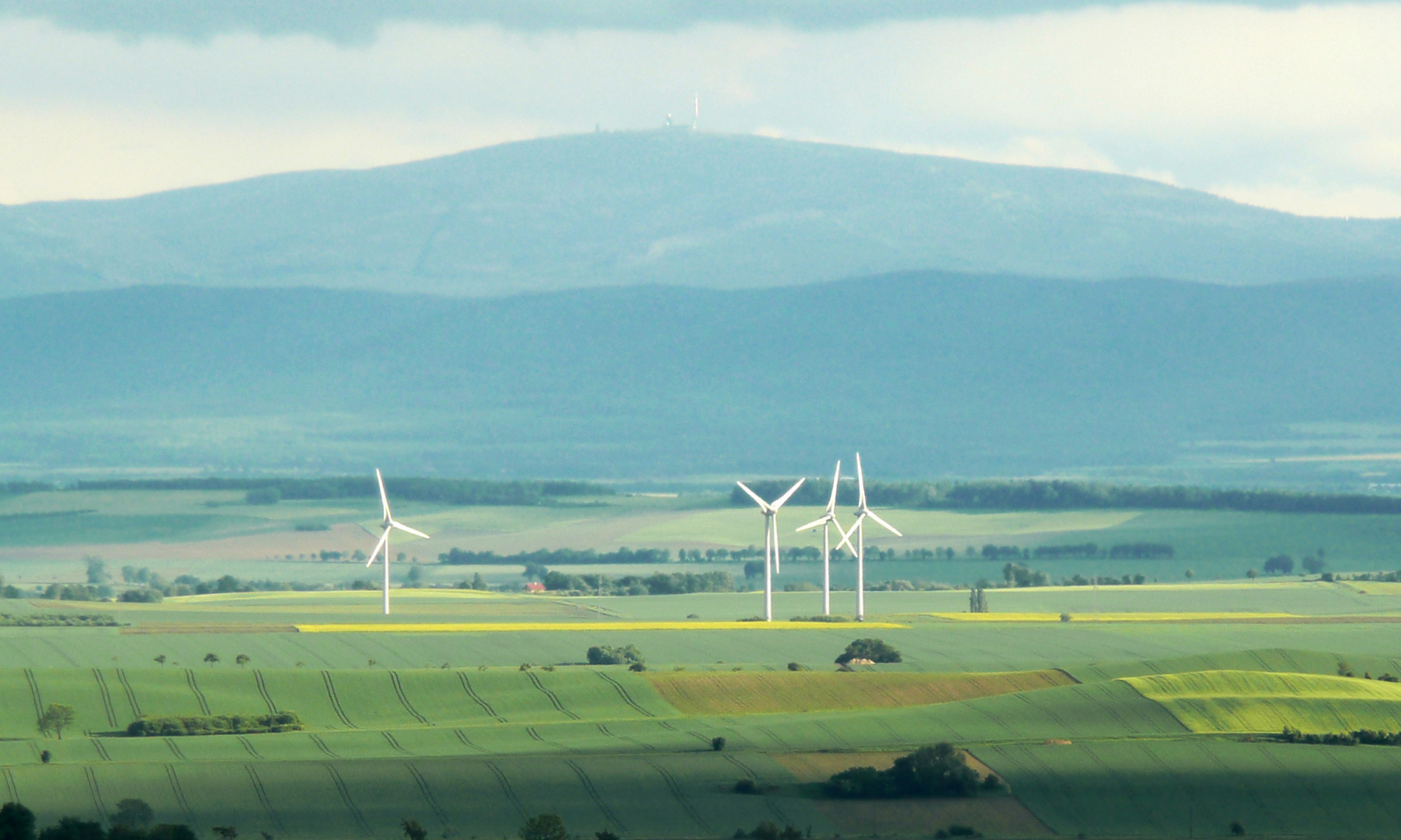
View from Asse hills to Harz range with Mt. Brocken

Brunswick Land (German: Braunschweiger Land) is a historical region in the Southeast of the German state of Lower Saxony, centred around the city of Braunschweig. It refers to the core territory of the historic Duchy of Brunswick and its successor, the Free State of Brunswick, which was disestablished in 1946.

== Geography ==
The area stretches from the Harz mountain range in the south along the Oker river down to the Burgdorf-Peine Geest in the North German Plain. The natural landscape includes the Elm, Asse and Salzgitter Hills, the Hainberg and Vorholz ranges in the west, as well as the Harly Forest.

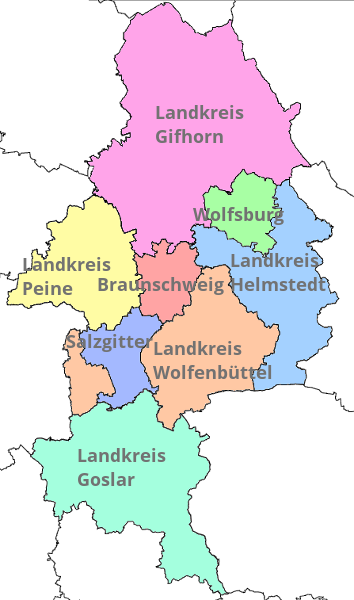
Cities and districts of the Braunschweig Region

Today Brunswick Land roughly corresponds to the central parts of the former Lower Saxon Verwaltungsbezirk Braunschweig in its pre-1978 borders, including:

- the independent cities of Braunschweig, Salzgitter, and Wolfsburg
- at least parts of the districts of Gifhorn, Goslar, Helmstedt, Peine, and Wolfenbüttel.

The district of Holzminden, part of the Free State of Brunswick until 1941, today belongs to the neighbouring South Lower Saxony region. Likewise, the eastern Brunswick exclaves of Calvörde and Blankenburg today are part of Saxony-Anhalt, while the northwestern exclave of Thedinghausen belongs to Verden district.

On that basis and excluding several unincorporated territories in the Harz mountains, the region has an area of 4,716.43 square kilometres (1,821.02 mi^{2}) and a population of 1,115,876. The population density, at 237 people/km^{2}, is higher than the Lower Saxon and the German average.

Away from the main cities, the region encompasses large agricultural areas. The traffic infrastructure relies on numerous railway lines and controlled-access highways such as Bundesautobahn 2 and Bundesautobahn 39. The main employer in the region is Volkswagen headquartered in Wolfsburg.

Important educational facilities include the Braunschweig University of Technology, the Clausthal University of Technology, the Braunschweig University of Art, the Ostfalia University of Applied Sciences, as well as the Herzog August Library in Wolfenbüttel. Other institutions include the Physikalisch-Technische Bundesanstalt in Braunschweig, the Federal Office for Radiation Protection in Salzgitter, as well as Braunschweig locations of the German Aerospace Center, the Federal Research Centre for Cultivated Plants (Julius-Kühn-Institut) and the Friedrich Loeffler Institute for Animal Health.

== Regional associations ==
The Brunswick Landscape Association (Verein Braunschweigische Landschaft) with its seat in Braunschweig was established in 1990. As a cultural-political organisation, it has set itself the aim of promoting the identity of Brunswick Land and ties between the populations and their history after the foundation of the state of Lower Saxony. The effective area covers the central territories around the cities of Braunschweig, Salzgitter and Wolfsburg as well as the adjacent districts of Helmstedt, Peine and Wolfenbüttel. The association uses a silhouette of the Saxon Steed as its emblem.

The cities and districts of the larger Braunschweig Region form the eastern part of the Hannover–Braunschweig–Göttingen–Wolfsburg Metropolitan Region. The associated regional authorities closely cooperate in matters of regional planning and public transport.

== Legends and traditions ==
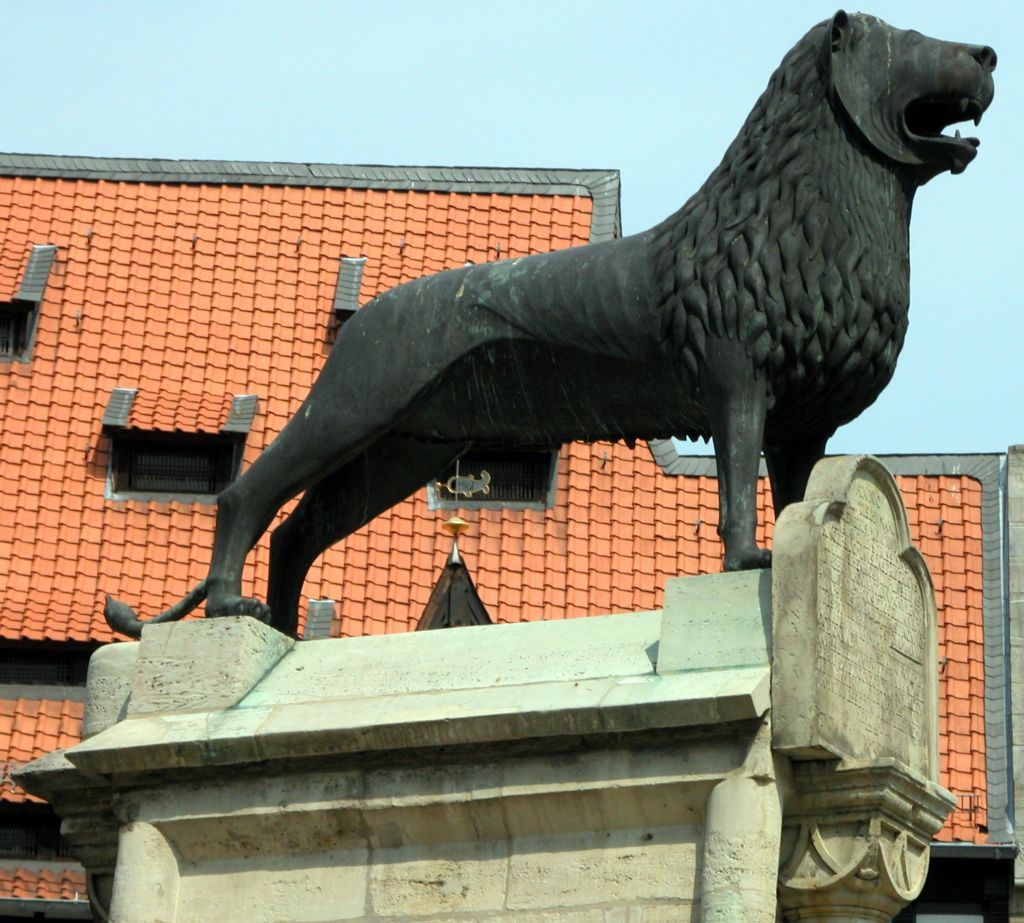
Brunswick Lion

The former Duchy of Brunswick arose in 1814 as successor of the Principality of Brunswick-Wolfenbüttel, which for centuries was ruled by the Welf descendants of Henry the Lion. He had received the Duchy of Saxony as an Imperial fief in 1142 and chose the City of Braunschweig as his residence. One of the most powerful German princes, he entered into a fierce conflict with the Hohenstaufen emperor Frederick Barbarossa and finally was banned in 1180. He could only retain his allodial possessions around Brunswick and Lüneburg, the nucleus of the later Welf duchy.

Like the tales that refer to Henry the Lion (as rendered by Agostino Steffani's opera Henrico Leone), the legends about the medieval trickster Till Eulenspiegel from Kneitlingen, Brunswick Mum beer, or the alleged foundation of Braunschweig and Dankwarderode Castle by the Brunonid brothers Brun and Dankward, are rich in tradition. The densely forested mountains of the Harz and Elm ranges are the setting of numerous myths and fables.

== Cities and towns ==
Towns in the Braunschweig Region (including present-day urban districts):

- Bad Gandersheim
- Bad Harzburg
- Braunlage
- Braunschweig
- Goslar
- Gifhorn
- Helmstedt
- Hornburg
- Königslutter
- Liebenburg
- Peine
- Salzgitter
- Seesen
- Schöningen
- Schöppenstedt
- Vienenburg
- Wolfenbüttel
- Wolfsburg

== See also ==
- Braunschweiger Zeitung
