= Elm-Asse =

- Samtgemeinde
- Location of Elm-Asse within Wolfenbüttel district
- Interactive map of Elm-Asse
- Location within Germany Location within Lower Saxony
- Coordinates: 52°8′N 10°47′E
- Country: Germany
- State: Lower Saxony
- District: Wolfenbüttel
- Seat: Schöppenstedt
- Subdivisions: 12 municipalities

Area
  - Total: 214.06 km^{2} (82.65 sq mi)

Population (2025-12-31)
  - Total: 17,364
  - Density: 81.117/km^{2} (210.09/sq mi)
- Time zone: UTC+01:00 (CET)
  - Summer (DST): UTC+02:00 (CEST)
- Website: www.elm-asse.de

Elm-Asse is a Samtgemeinde ("collective municipality") in the district of Wolfenbüttel, in Lower Saxony, Germany. It was named after the hill ranges Elm and Asse. Its seat is in the town Schöppenstedt, with a branch office in Remlingen. It was formed on 1 January 2015 by the merger of the former Samtgemeinden Asse and Schöppenstedt.

The Samtgemeinde Elm-Asse consists of the following municipalities:

1. Dahlum
2. Denkte
3. Hedeper
4. Kissenbrück
5. Kneitlingen
6. Remlingen-Semmenstedt
7. Roklum
8. Schöppenstedt
9. Uehrde
10. Vahlberg
11. Winnigstedt
12. Wittmar
