= Dahlum =

- Municipality
- Location of Dahlum within Wolfenbüttel district
- Interactive map of Dahlum
- Location within Germany Location within Lower Saxony
- Coordinates: 52°08′N 10°51′E
- Country: Germany
- State: Lower Saxony
- District: Wolfenbüttel
- Municipal assoc.: Elm-Asse
- Subdivisions: 2

Government
  - Mayor: Reinhard Eberlein

Area
  - Total: 15.18 km^{2} (5.86 sq mi)
- Elevation: 157 m (515 ft)

Population (2025-12-31)
  - Total: 647
  - Density: 42.6/km^{2} (110/sq mi)
- Time zone: UTC+01:00 (CET)
  - Summer (DST): UTC+02:00 (CEST)
- Postal codes: 38170
- Dialling codes: 05332
- Vehicle registration: WF

Dahlum (German pronunciation: [ˈdaːlʊm]) is a municipality in the district of Wolfenbüttel, in Lower Saxony, Germany.
