= Wittmar =

- Municipality
- Coat of arms

- Location of Wittmar within Wolfenbüttel district
- Interactive map of Wittmar
- Location within Germany Location within Lower Saxony
- Coordinates: 52°08′N 10°38′E
- Country: Germany
- State: Lower Saxony
- District: Wolfenbüttel
- Municipal assoc.: Elm-Asse

Government
  - Mayor: Andreas Becker (SPD)

Area
  - Total: 4.66 km^{2} (1.80 sq mi)
- Elevation: 131 m (430 ft)

Population (2025-12-31)
  - Total: 1,050
  - Density: 225/km^{2} (584/sq mi)
- Time zone: UTC+01:00 (CET)
  - Summer (DST): UTC+02:00 (CEST)
- Postal codes: 38329
- Dialling codes: 05337
- Vehicle registration: WF

Wittmar (German pronunciation: [ˈvɪtmaʁ]) is a municipality in the district of Wolfenbüttel, in Lower Saxony, Germany.

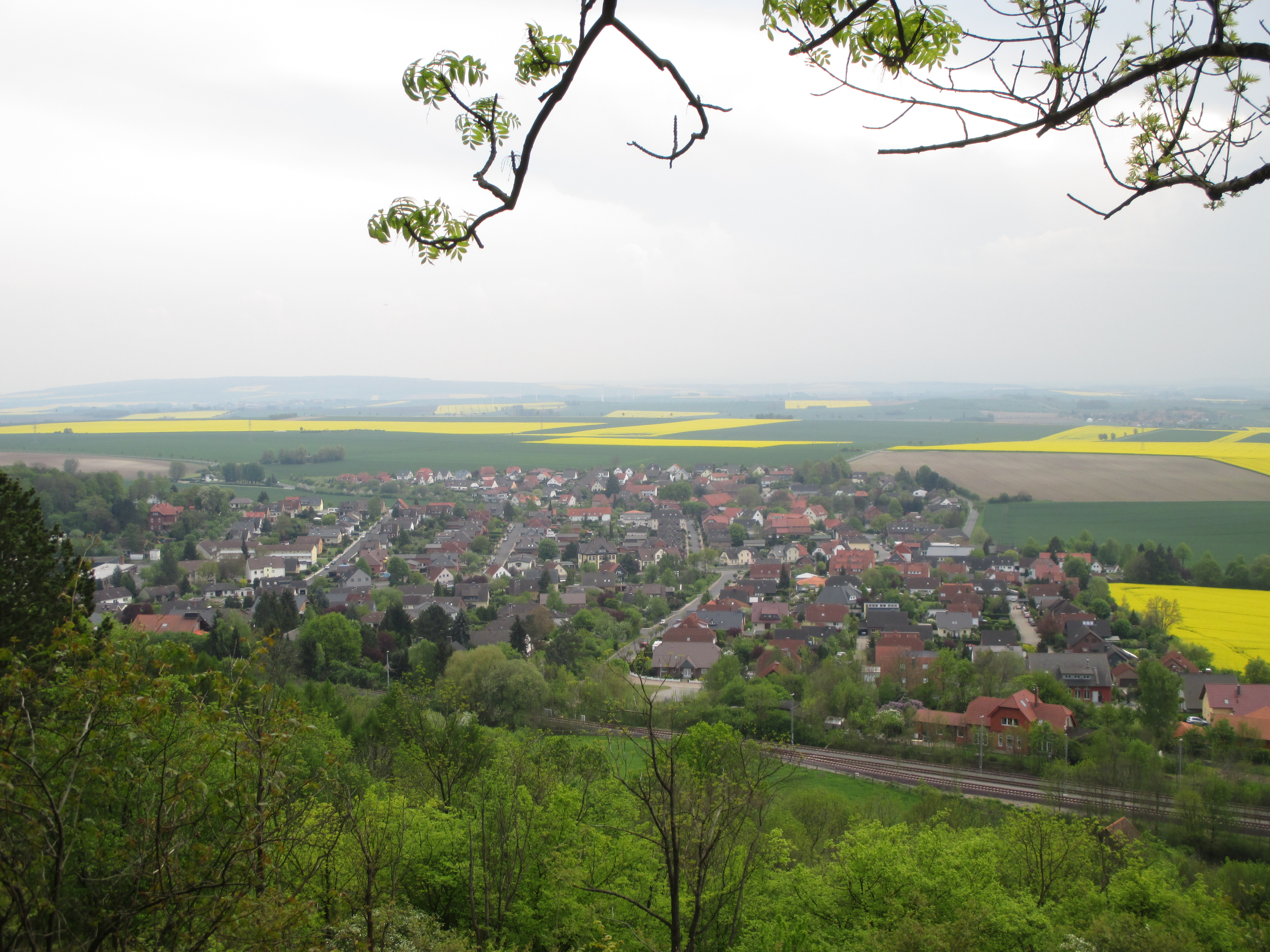
Wittmar

== Asse ==
For several hundred years, salt has been mined in Asse, a small mountain range in the district of Wolfenbüttel. One of these mines, Schacht Asse II, is now used to store low- and medium-grade radioactive waste produced by medicine and nuclear power plants.
