= Uehrde =

- Municipality
- Location of Uehrde within Wolfenbüttel district
- Interactive map of Uehrde
- Location within Germany Location within Lower Saxony
- Coordinates: 52°06′N 10°46′E
- Country: Germany
- State: Lower Saxony
- District: Wolfenbüttel
- Municipal assoc.: Elm-Asse
- Subdivisions: 4 Ortsteile

Government
  - Mayor: Ellen Rautmann (CDU)

Area
  - Total: 24.33 km^{2} (9.39 sq mi)
- Elevation: 107 m (351 ft)

Population (2025-12-31)
  - Total: 843
  - Density: 34.6/km^{2} (89.7/sq mi)
- Time zone: UTC+01:00 (CET)
  - Summer (DST): UTC+02:00 (CEST)
- Postal codes: 38170
- Dialling codes: 05332
- Vehicle registration: WF

Uehrde is a municipality in the district of Wolfenbüttel, in Lower Saxony, Germany.

== History ==
It was first mentioned in 888 - then known as Urithi - when it was transferred from the monastery of Corvey to the ownership of Otto I, Duke of Saxony. The ducal fiefs went between 1255 and 1600 to the von Bortlfelt and the Vordorf families. Many families had estates or properties here, for example those of Amplebem, Hondelage, Strombeck, Weferlingen and Vordorf. The “Brunswick Cyriaksstift”, the Hospital Beatae Virginis, and the Aegidienkloster (a monastery of the Aegidian school of Augustinianism) had holdings in the village. A knightly family from this village has been known since 1204. As late as 1782 there were still remains of a keep and windmill built by Duke Julius of Brunswick-Lüneburg to be seen. These were traced back to 1584 and were still there around 1950.

=== Statistics ===
On the 1st of March 1974 Uehrde was combined with the until then independent municipalities of Barnstorf, Warle and Watzum.

The four districts and the number of inhabitants as of 1 March 2018:

District	Inhabitants
Barnstorf	237
Uehrde	272
Warle	170
Watzum	220
Total	899
