= Kissenbrück =

- Municipality
- Coat of arms

- Location of Kissenbrück within Wolfenbüttel district
- Interactive map of Kissenbrück
- Location within Germany Location within Lower Saxony
- Coordinates: 52°07′N 10°35′E
- Country: Germany
- State: Lower Saxony
- District: Wolfenbüttel
- Municipal assoc.: Elm-Asse

Government
  - Mayor: Gerhard Wiche (CDU)

Area
  - Total: 6.64 km^{2} (2.56 sq mi)
- Elevation: 93 m (305 ft)

Population (2025-12-31)
  - Total: 1,684
  - Density: 254/km^{2} (657/sq mi)
- Time zone: UTC+01:00 (CET)
  - Summer (DST): UTC+02:00 (CEST)
- Postal codes: 38324
- Dialling codes: 05337
- Vehicle registration: WF
- Website: www.kissenbrueck.de

Kissenbrück is a municipality in the district of Wolfenbüttel, in Lower Saxony, Germany.
