= Vahlberg =

- Municipality
- Location of Vahlberg within Wolfenbüttel district
- Interactive map of Vahlberg
- Location within Germany Location within Lower Saxony
- Coordinates: 52°08′N 10°43′E
- Country: Germany
- State: Lower Saxony
- District: Wolfenbüttel
- Municipal assoc.: Elm-Asse
- Subdivisions: 3 Ortsteile

Government
  - Mayor: Jürgen Ahrens (SPD)

Area
  - Total: 18.01 km^{2} (6.95 sq mi)
- Elevation: 133 m (436 ft)

Population (2025-12-31)
  - Total: 656
  - Density: 36.4/km^{2} (94.3/sq mi)
- Time zone: UTC+01:00 (CET)
  - Summer (DST): UTC+02:00 (CEST)
- Postal codes: 38170
- Dialling codes: 05332
- Vehicle registration: WF

Vahlberg is a municipality in Wolfenbüttel, a district in Lower Saxony, Germany.
