= Winnigstedt =

- Municipality
- Coat of arms

- Location of Winnigstedt within Wolfenbüttel district
- Interactive map of Winnigstedt
- Location within Germany Location within Lower Saxony
- Coordinates: 52°04′00″N 10°45′58″E
- Country: Germany
- State: Lower Saxony
- District: Wolfenbüttel
- Municipal assoc.: Elm-Asse
- Subdivisions: 2 districts

Government
  - Mayor: Kurt Alpers (CDU)

Area
  - Total: 12.08 km^{2} (4.66 sq mi)
- Elevation: 91 m (299 ft)

Population (2025-12-31)
  - Total: 638
  - Density: 52.8/km^{2} (137/sq mi)
- Time zone: UTC+01:00 (CET)
  - Summer (DST): UTC+02:00 (CEST)
- Postal codes: 38170
- Dialling codes: 05336
- Vehicle registration: WF
- Website: www.winnigstedt.de

Winnigstedt (German pronunciation: [ˈvɪnɪçˌʃtɛt]) is a municipality in the district of Wolfenbüttel, in Lower Saxony, Germany.

== Geography ==
The village is situated north of the Großes Bruch marshland and west of the Magdeburg Börde, with good soil quality in the surrounding area. In the south, it directly borders on the village of Hessen in Saxony-Anhalt.

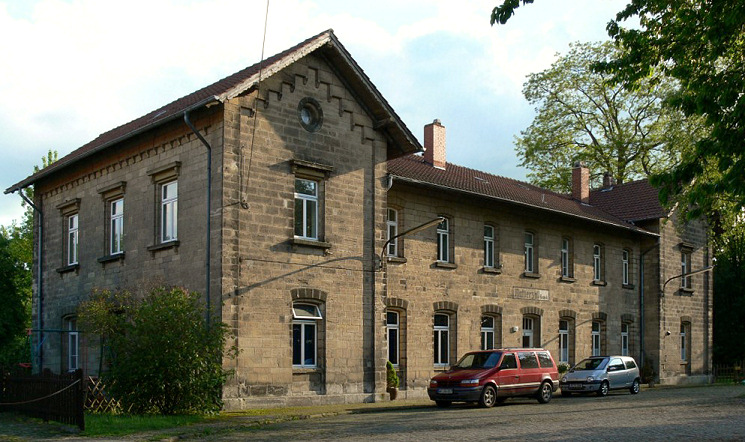
Mattierzoll station

The municipal area comprises Winnigstedt proper and the southern quarter of Mattierzoll, which has been a toll station on the road from Wolfenbüttel to Halberstadt (called Hessendamm, present-day Bundesstrasse No. 79) for centuries. It allowed travellers to cross the wetland on a causeway connecting the Brunswick-Lüneburg lands in the north with the territory of the Prince-Bishops of Halberstadt in the south. After World War II, it bordered on the Soviet occupation zone, later the German Democratic Republic, and the road was closed until the Peaceful Revolution in 1989. A preserved watchtower on the road marks the former Inner German border.

Since 1902, Mattierzoll also was a railroad junction, where the Jerxheim–Börßum railway was connected with the line from Braunschweig to Schöningen and the private railway to Heudeber. In the 1950s railway service to East German Heudeber discontinued, nevertheless the border station remained a rail hub between the Braunschweig-Schöningen line and the railway from Helmstedt to Holzminden. All lines have been dismantled until the late 1970s.

== History ==
Winnincstede in the Duchy of Saxony was first mentioned in an 1182 deed, then a possession of Mariental Abbey. In 1351 the patronage of the parish church passed to the Riddagshausen monastery. The present-day municipality was established in 1939 by merging the two villages of Groß and Klein Winnigstedt.
