= Denkte =

- Municipality
- Location of Denkte within Wolfenbüttel district
- Interactive map of Denkte
- Location within Germany Location within Lower Saxony
- Coordinates: 52°08′59″N 10°36′29″E
- Country: Germany
- State: Lower Saxony
- District: Wolfenbüttel
- Municipal assoc.: Elm-Asse
- Subdivisions: 4 Ortsteile

Government
  - Mayor: Guido Bartschat

Area
  - Total: 18.26 km^{2} (7.05 sq mi)
- Elevation: 154 m (505 ft)

Population (2025-12-31)
  - Total: 2,692
  - Density: 147.4/km^{2} (381.8/sq mi)
- Time zone: UTC+01:00 (CET)
  - Summer (DST): UTC+02:00 (CEST)
- Postal codes: 38321
- Dialling codes: 05331
- Vehicle registration: WF

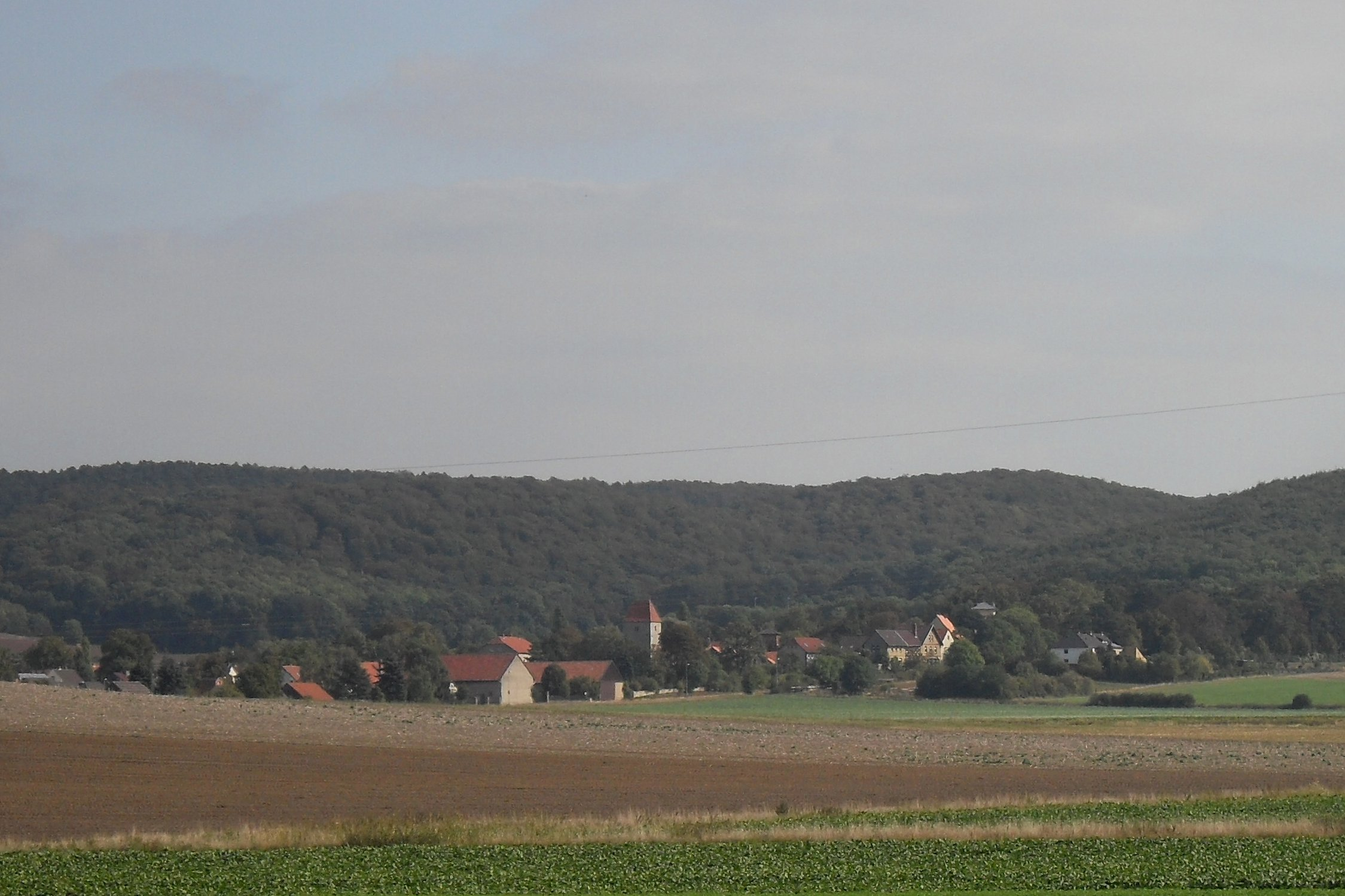
View on Gr. Denkte from Kl. Denkte

Denkte (German pronunciation: [ˈdɛŋktə]) is a municipality in the district of Wolfenbüttel, in Lower Saxony, Germany. It governs the villages of Gr. Denkte, Kl. Denkte, Neindorf and Sottmar.
