= Roklum =

- Municipality
- Coat of arms

- Location of Roklum within Wolfenbüttel district
- Interactive map of Roklum
- Location within Germany Location within Lower Saxony
- Coordinates: 52°04′N 10°44′E
- Country: Germany
- State: Lower Saxony
- District: Wolfenbüttel
- Municipal assoc.: Elm-Asse

Government
  - Mayor: Ute Heider (SPD)

Area
  - Total: 8.34 km^{2} (3.22 sq mi)
- Elevation: 106 m (348 ft)

Population (2025-12-31)
  - Total: 422
  - Density: 50.6/km^{2} (131/sq mi)
- Time zone: UTC+01:00 (CET)
  - Summer (DST): UTC+02:00 (CEST)
- Postal codes: 38325
- Dialling codes: 05336
- Vehicle registration: WF

Roklum is a municipality in the district of Wolfenbüttel, in Lower Saxony, Germany.
