= Hedeper =

- Municipality
- Coat of arms

- Location of Hedeper within Wolfenbüttel district
- Interactive map of Hedeper
- Location within Germany Location within Lower Saxony
- Coordinates: 52°04′N 10°41′E
- Country: Germany
- State: Lower Saxony
- District: Wolfenbüttel
- Municipal assoc.: Elm-Asse
- Subdivisions: 2

Government
  - Mayor: Heinz Fandre (SPD)

Area
  - Total: 15.66 km^{2} (6.05 sq mi)
- Elevation: 94 m (308 ft)

Population (2025-12-31)
  - Total: 462
  - Density: 29.5/km^{2} (76.4/sq mi)
- Time zone: UTC+01:00 (CET)
  - Summer (DST): UTC+02:00 (CEST)
- Postal codes: 38322
- Dialling codes: 05336
- Vehicle registration: WF
- Website: www.hedeper.de

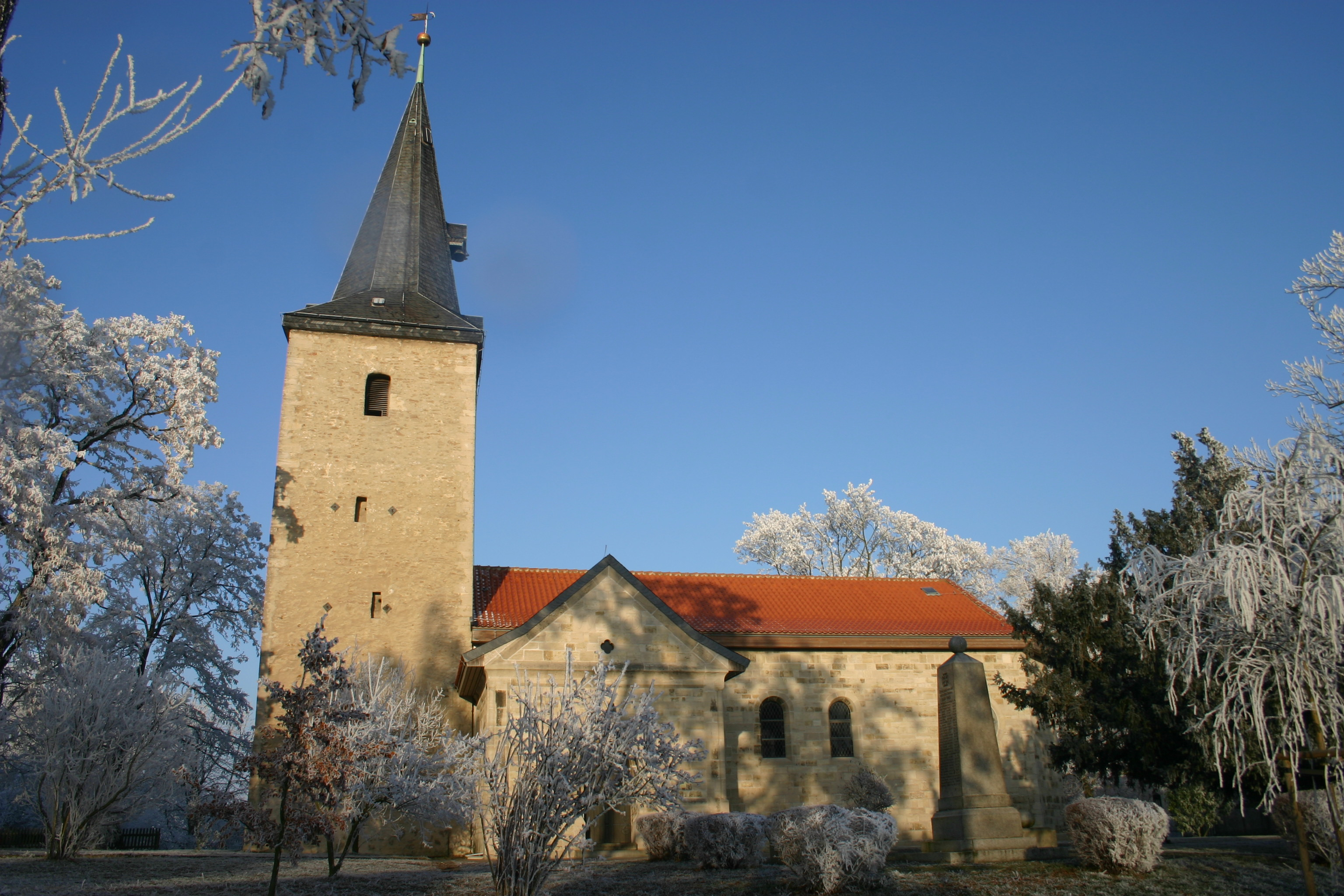
church in Hedeper

Hedeper is a municipality in the foothills of the Harz in east Lower Saxony. It has about 600 inhabitants, and is in the administrative district of Wolfenbüttel.

== Geography ==
Wolfenbüttel lies about 15 km to the north-west of Hedeper. Hedeper is the most southernly municipality in the higher municipality "Asse". It consists of the towns of Wetzleben (146 inhabitants) and Hedeper (401 inhabitants).

== History ==
Both municipalities of Wetzleben and Hedeper were united in one common municipality in 1974. Hedeper was mentioned in a written document for the first time in 1188 and Wetzleben already in 994.

== Culture and sights ==
As a landmark of Hedeper, an old windmill is situated to the west of the village ("Erdholländer Windmühle"). It was built in 1900 and was in use until 1956. From this spot one could once see 20 windmills, none of which remain today. Instead, the new windwheels of the local windmill power plant surround Hedeper.

Hedeper has come to life again after the depression in the eighties, when several local farms had to shut down. It now boasts a small, but active sportsclub, a shooting club, a Protestant congregation, and an auxiliary fire brigade. Three local farmers have joined to build a biogas plant serving the local community.

The village church was restored to its original state in 2002.

Located in the southeast lies the "block mountain" (Klotzeberg), the first and smallest natural reserve of the administrative district.

== Economy and infrastructure ==
The inhabitants work mostly in Wolfenbüttel, Braunschweig, Salzgitter or Wolfsburg.

In earlier times, many inhabitants earned their living as drivers during the hunts that took place in fall.
