= Schöppenstedt =

- Town
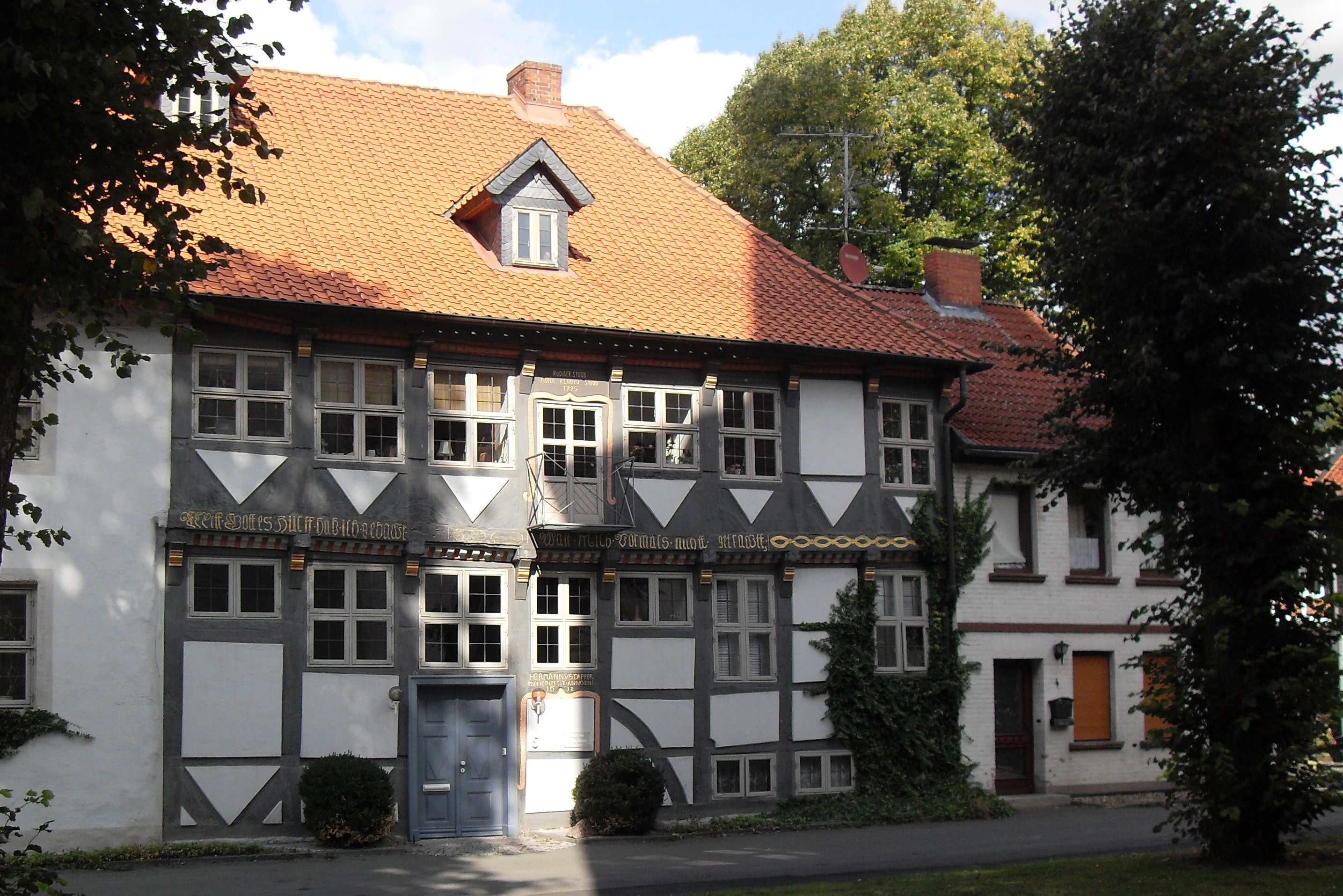
- Timber framed house in Schöppenstedt

- Flag Coat of arms

- Location of Schöppenstedt within Wolfenbüttel district
- Interactive map of Schöppenstedt
- Location within Germany Location within Lower Saxony
- Coordinates: 52°07′59″N 10°46′42″E
- Country: Germany
- State: Lower Saxony
- District: Wolfenbüttel
- Municipal assoc.: Elm-Asse

Government
  - Mayor: Andrea Föniger (SPD)

Area
  - Total: 39.73 km^{2} (15.34 sq mi)
- Elevation: 100 m (330 ft)

Population (2025-12-31)
  - Total: 5,276
  - Density: 132.8/km^{2} (343.9/sq mi)
- Time zone: UTC+01:00 (CET)
  - Summer (DST): UTC+02:00 (CEST)
- Postal codes: 38170
- Dialling codes: 05332
- Vehicle registration: WF

Schöppenstedt (German pronunciation: [ˈʃœpn̩ˌʃtɛt]; Eastphalian: Schöppenstidde) is a small town in the district of Wolfenbüttel, in Lower Saxony, Germany. It is the administrative seat of the Samtgemeinde ("collective municipality") of Elm-Asse.

== Geography ==
It is situated southwest of the Elm and Asse hill ranges, about 17 km (11 mi) east of Wolfenbüttel, and 21 km (13 mi) southeast of Braunschweig.

Since 2007, Schöppenstedt station is the eastern terminus on the Wolfenbüttel–Helmstedt railway line.

== History ==
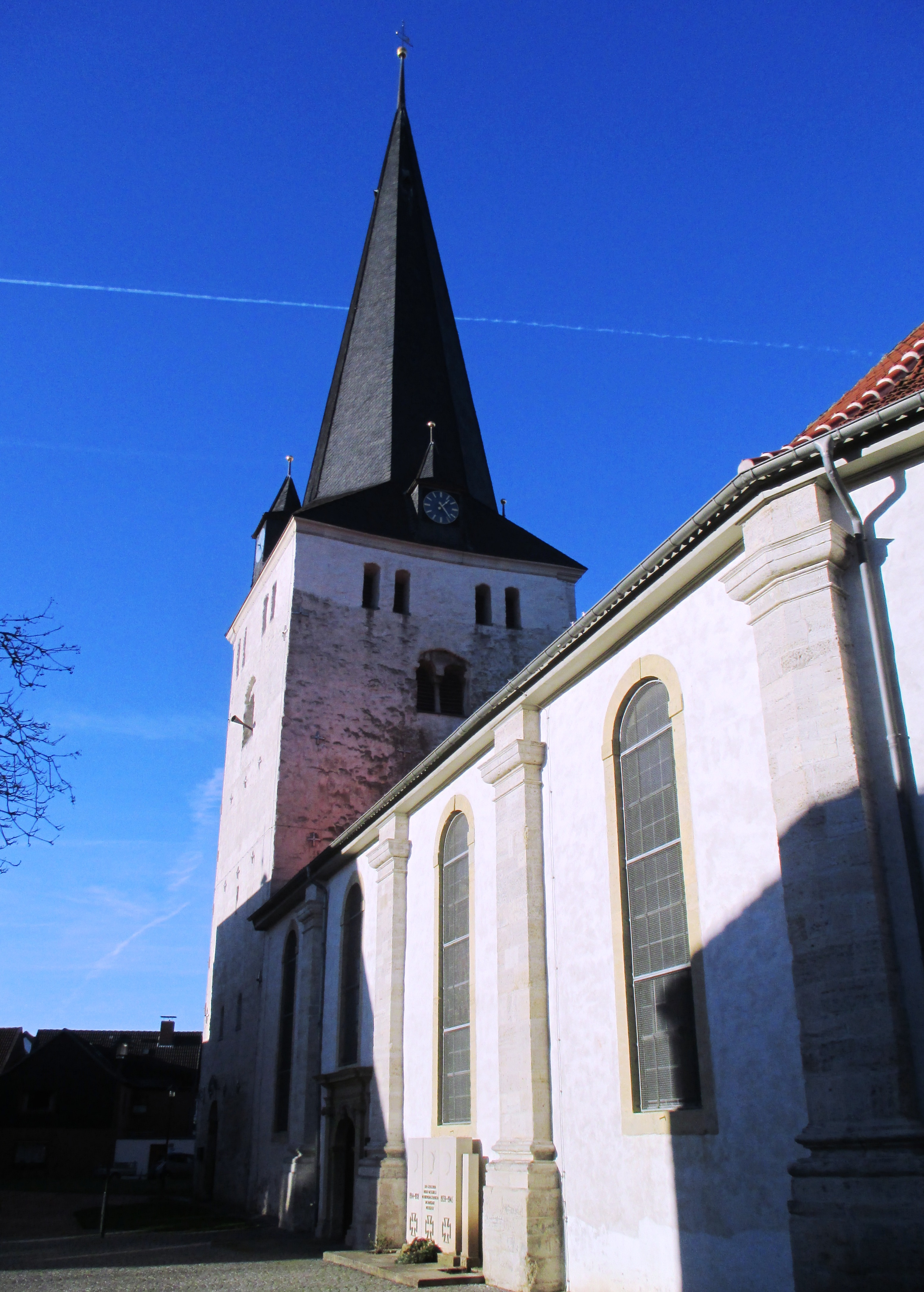
St. Stephen's Church

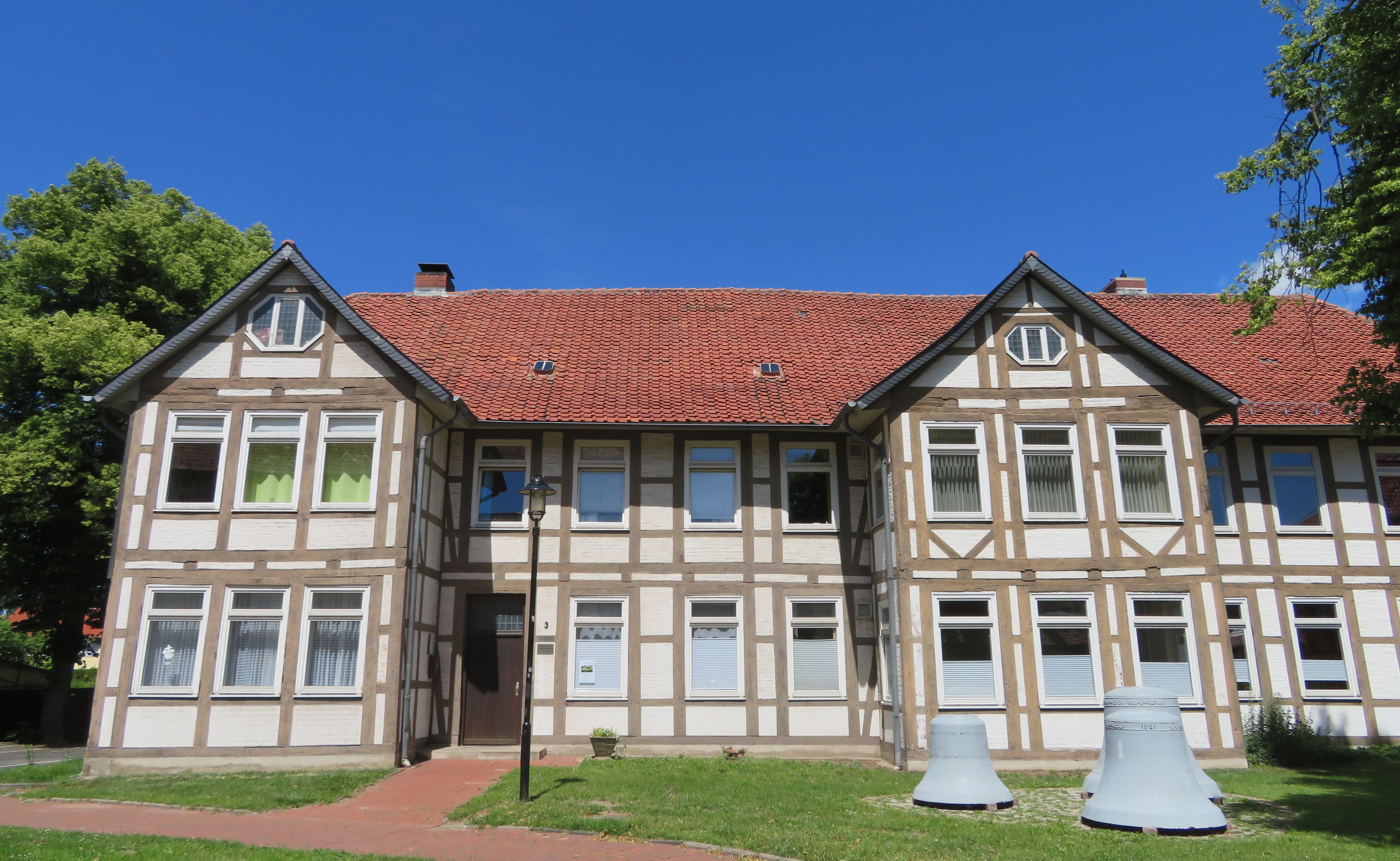
Parish House and War Memorial

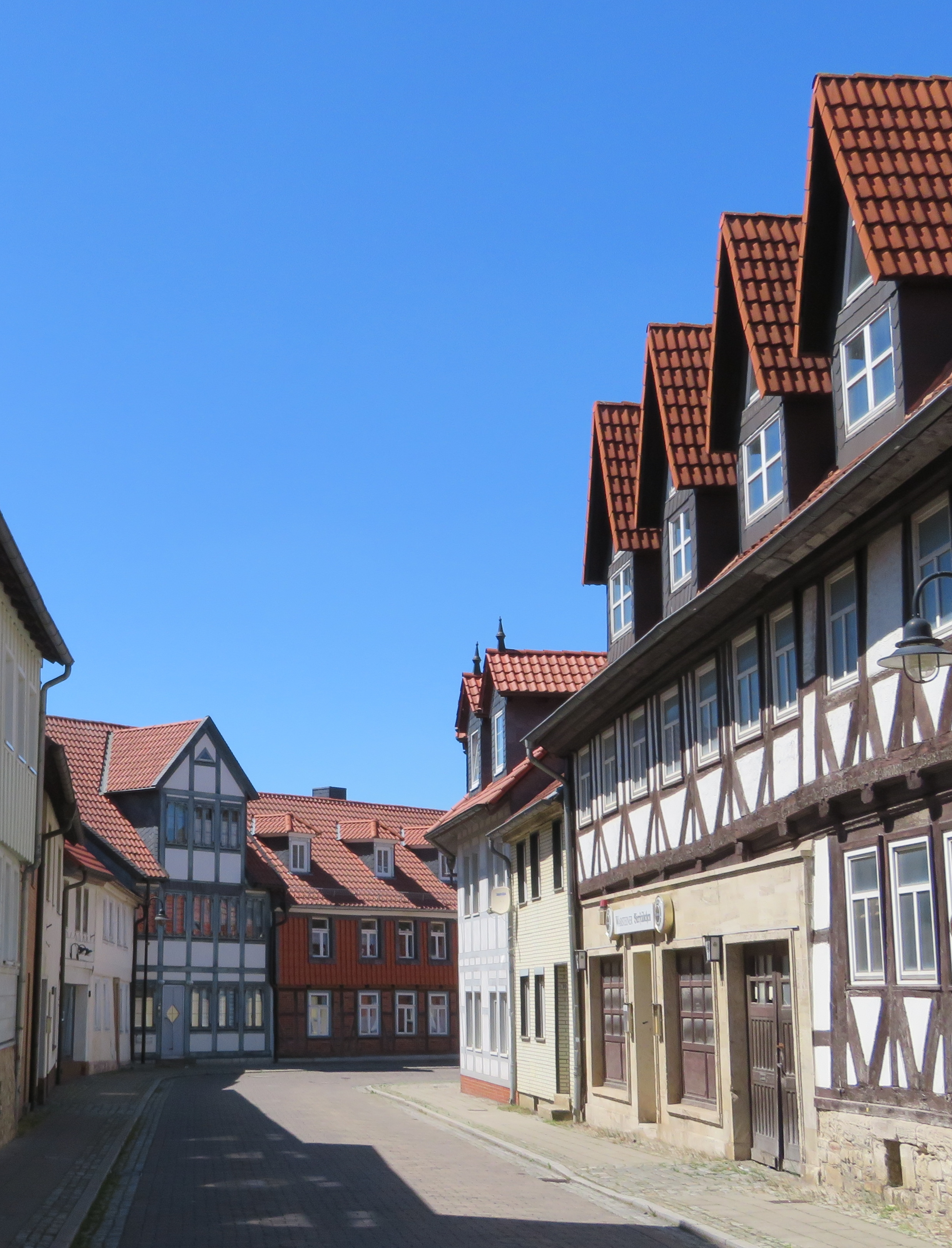
Half-timbered houses in Braunschweiger Strasse

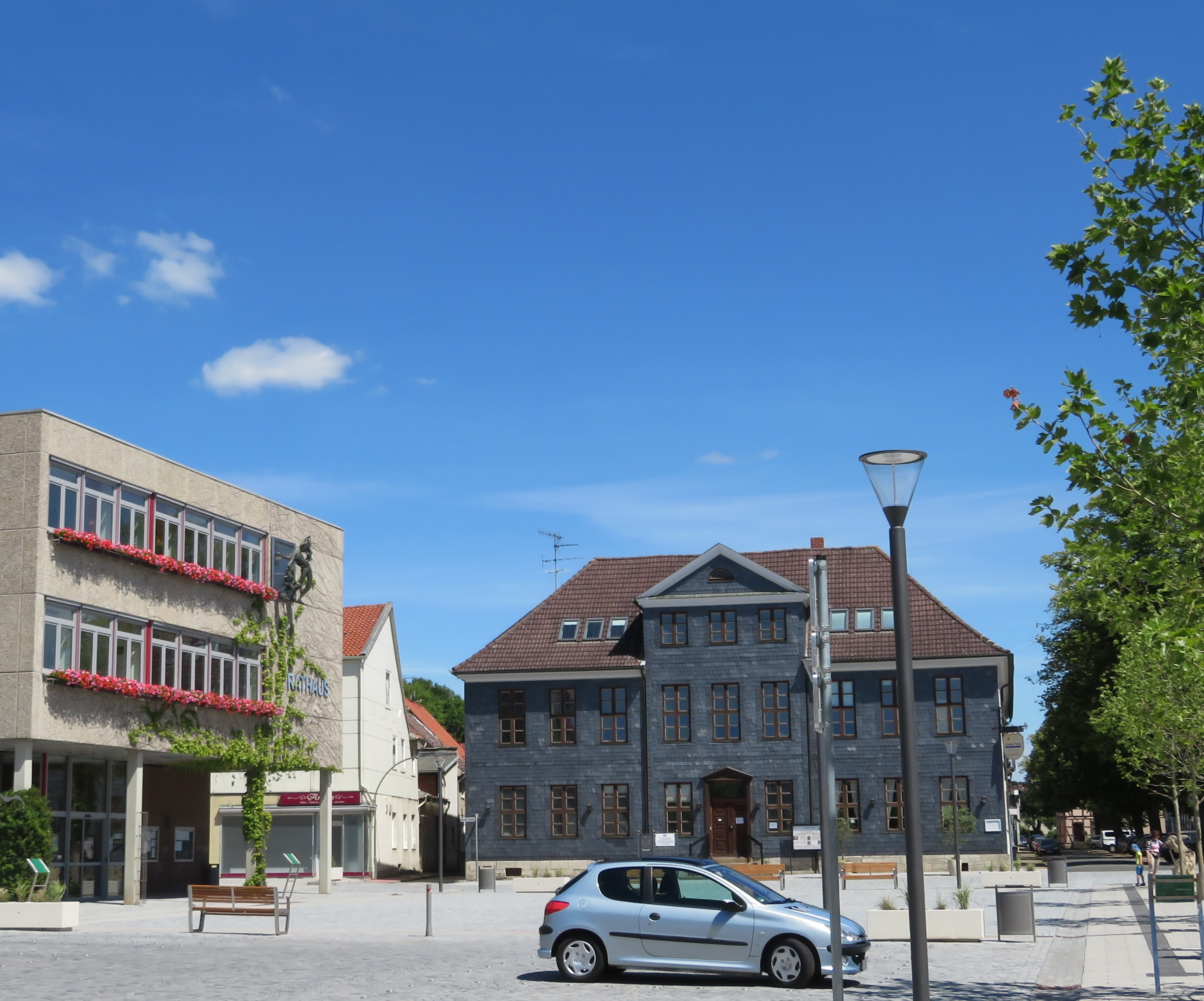
Market Place

The settlement of Sciphinstete in the Derlingau region of Saxony, located on the trade route from Brunswick to the Königspfalz at Schöningen, was first mentioned in a 1051 deed. A church at the site probably existed in the days of the missionary bishop Hildegrim of Châlons before 827 AD; Schöppenstedt later became the seat of a Halberstadt archdeacon. From 1267 to 1269, the surrounding estates were held by the Welf dukes of Brunswick-Wolfenbüttel. In 1542, the citizens turned Protestant.

A main landmark is the St. Stephen's Church with its famous leaning tower of the 12th century. The interior contains remarkable stone pillars with depictions of animal figures and human heads, including Wotan and his ravens, the Fenrir Wolf, the Midgard Serpent and the Ash Yggdrasil (black and white illustration). These ornate pillars have been constructed with the introduction of Christianity as a monument to the ancient gods of faith - the ornaments could date from the first documented mention of Schöppenstedt.

== Sights ==
Schöppenstedt has a museum dedicated to the medieval trickster Till Eulenspiegel who was born in neighbouring Kneitlingen about 1300. There are various sightworthy half-timbered houses in the town centre, especially in Braunschweiger Straße and around the church. One of the most famous houses is Sitz der Archidiakone dating from 1612, a colourful house opposite the church. The nave of St. Stephen's Protestant Church was built from 1730 to 1740 in a barock style, but the clock tower dates from the 12th century. In front of the Parish House three bells form a War Memorial.

== Twin towns ==
- Athis-Val de Rouvre, France.

== Notable people ==
- Ludwig Strümpell (1812–1899), philosopher and pedagogue
