= Kneitlingen =

- Municipality
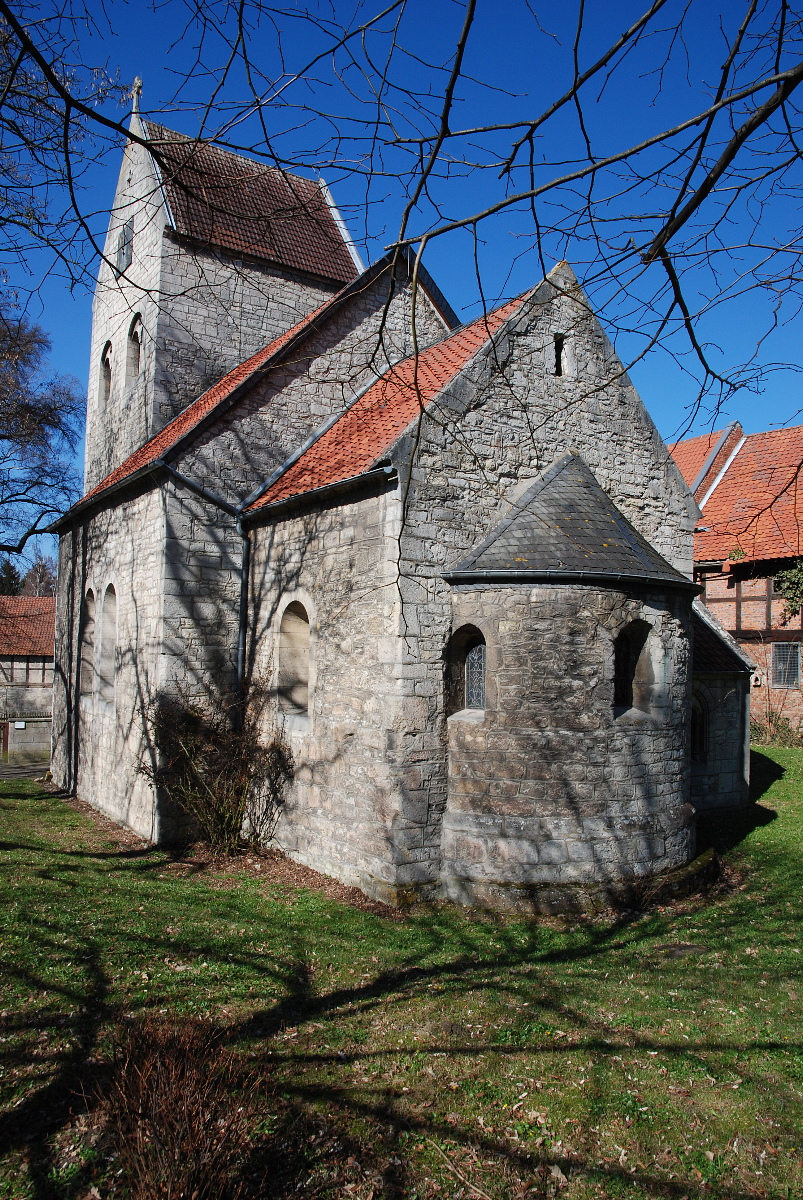
- The parish church in Kneitlingen

- Location of Kneitlingen within Wolfenbüttel district
- Interactive map of Kneitlingen
- Location within Germany Location within Lower Saxony
- Coordinates: 52°11′N 10°46′E
- Country: Germany
- State: Lower Saxony
- District: Wolfenbüttel
- Municipal assoc.: Elm-Asse
- Subdivisions: 4 Ortsteile

Government
  - Mayor: Johannes Feigel (CDU)

Area
  - Total: 17.58 km^{2} (6.79 sq mi)
- Elevation: 223 m (732 ft)

Population (2025-12-31)
  - Total: 738
  - Density: 42.0/km^{2} (109/sq mi)
- Time zone: UTC+01:00 (CET)
  - Summer (DST): UTC+02:00 (CEST)
- Postal codes: 38170
- Dialling codes: 05332
- Vehicle registration: WF

Kneitlingen is a municipality in the Wolfenbüttel district in the German state of Lower Saxony. It is part of the Samtgemeinde Elm-Asse. The most recent German census counted a population of just 853 people.

== Geography ==
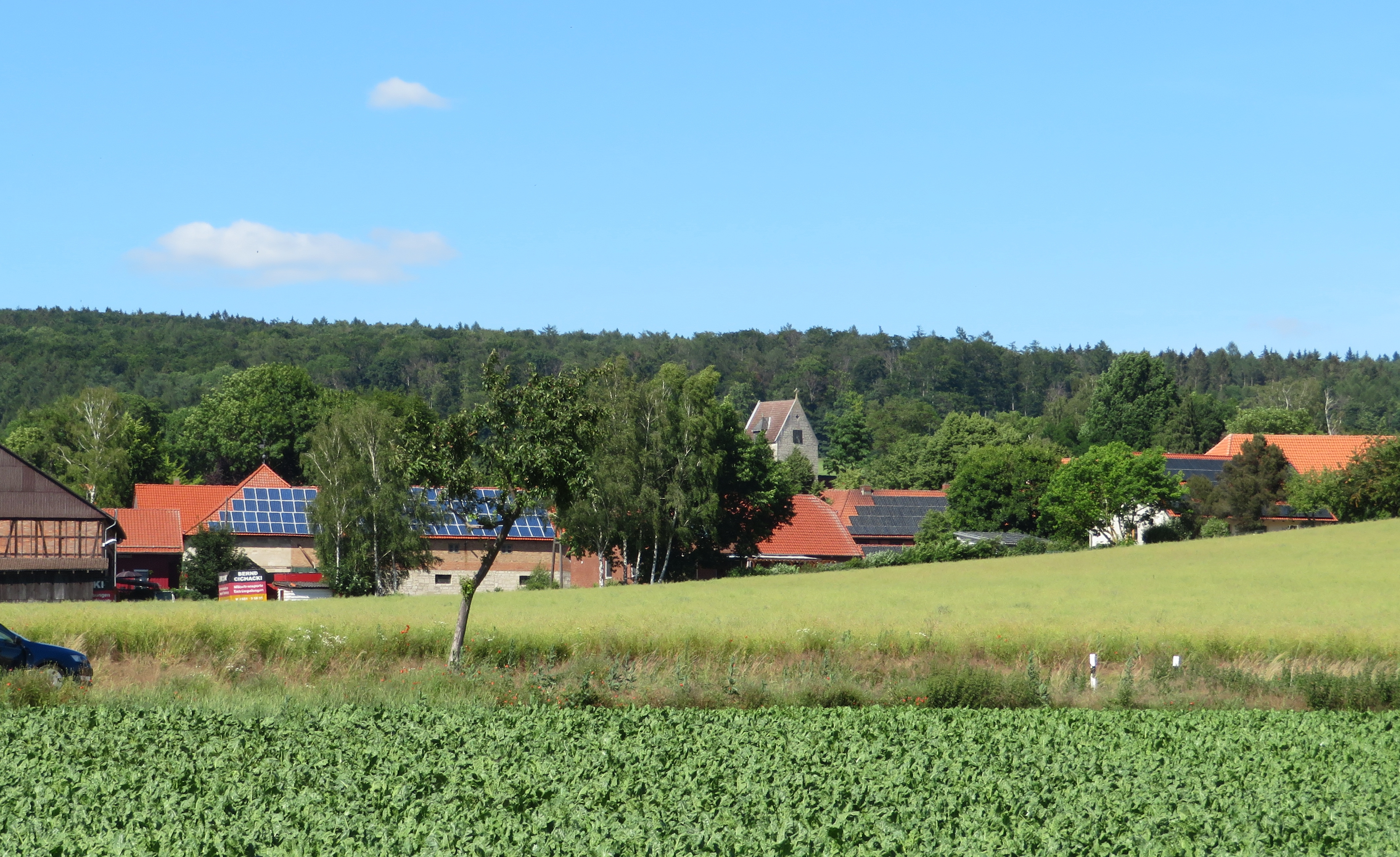
General view of Kneitlingen from the South

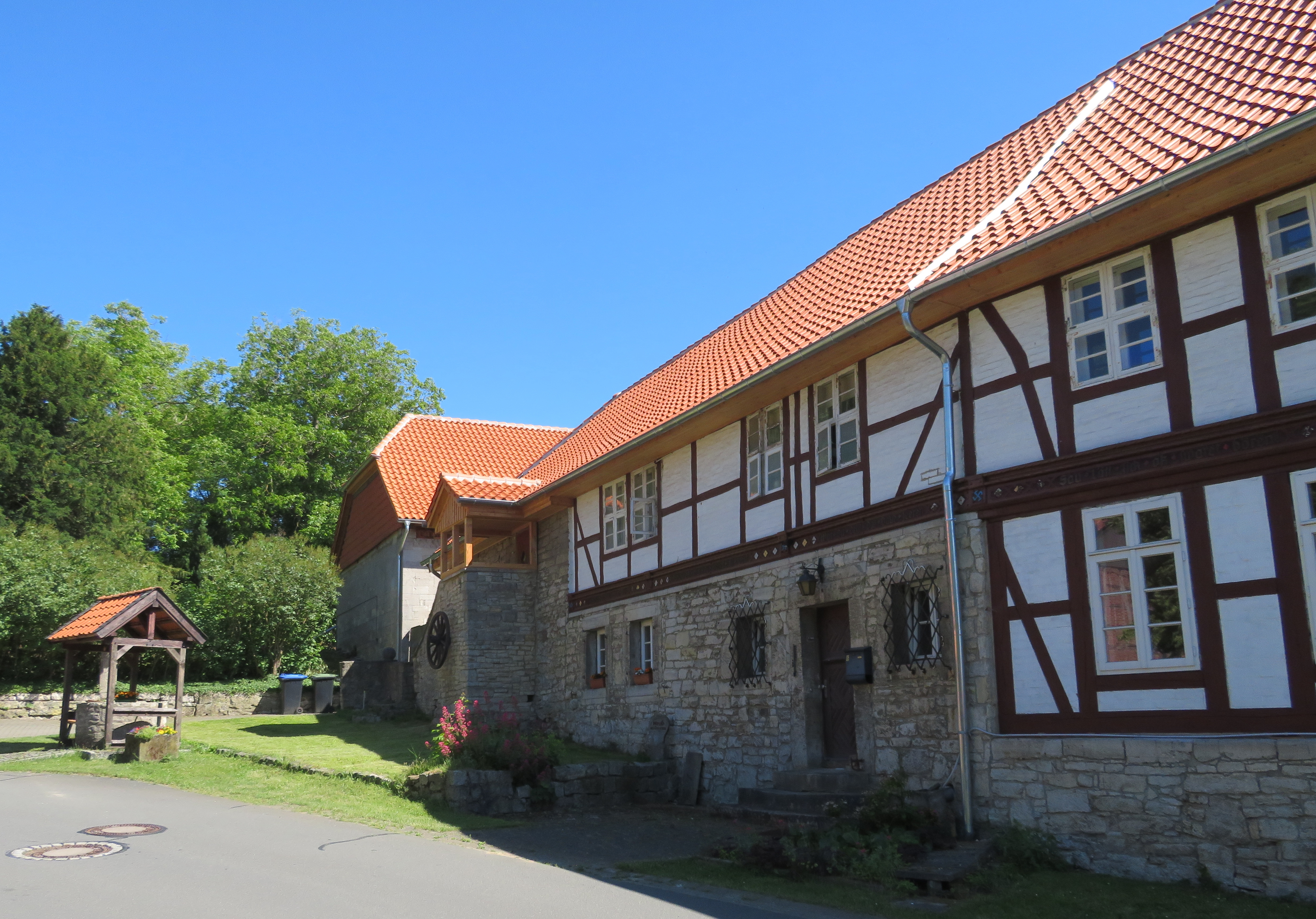
Village centre of Kneitlingen

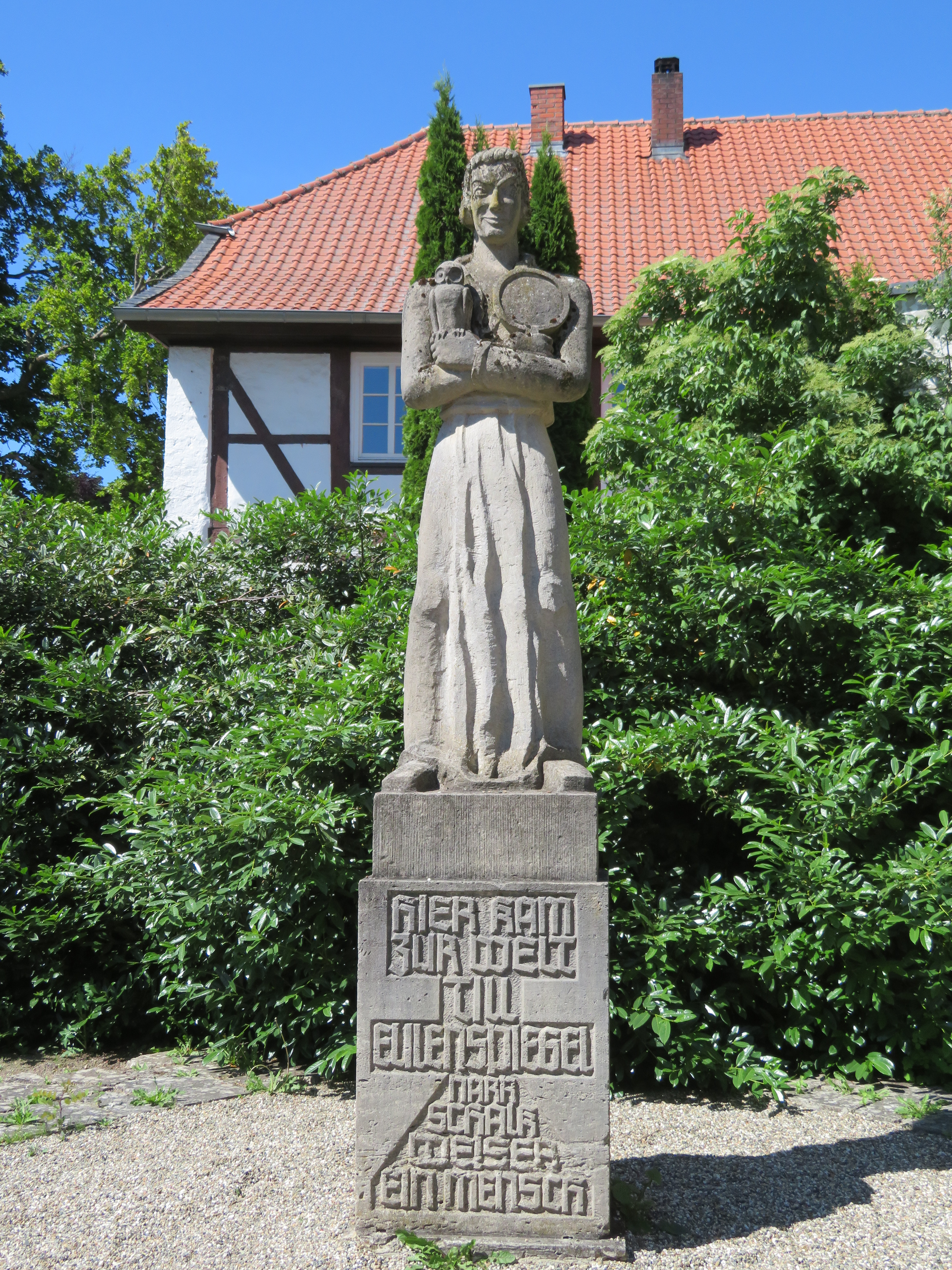
Eulenspiegel Memorial in Kneitlingen

Kneitlingen is situated in Brunswick Land between the Elm and Asse hill ranges. The municipality consists of the following four villages:

- Ampleben
- Bansleben
- Eilum
- Kneitlingen

== History ==
Kneitlingen in the medieval Duchy of Saxony was first mentioned in an 1135 deed issued by Emperor Lothair III, whereby he granted the estates to the newly established Benedictine abbey of Königslutter. The Romanesque parish church was erected by the Knights Templar about 1141; its apse and groin vault are preserved in the original condition. From 1235 onwards, the area belonged to the Duchy of Brunswick-Lüneburg, the lordship was enfeoffed to various local noble families.

The village of Kneitlingen is known as the birthplace of the legendary trickster Till Eulenspiegel. According to the tradition, he was baptised around 1300 in the chapel of nearby Ampleben Castle, whereupon the christening party proceeded to the local tavern. On the way home in the afternoon, Till's tipsy midwife, crossing a brook, slipped on the gangplank and together with the child fell into a mud puddle, baptising him for the second time. Neither the nurse nor the baby was harmed, however, Till was put into the bathtub at home, therefore baptised the third time that very day.

The former robber baron castle of Ampleben was purchased by Duke Magnus I of Brunswick-Lüneburg in 1355, upon its slighting the surrounding estates including the Romanesque parish church were acquired by the city of Brunswick in 1454. The citizens laid out a stone pit in the Elm range quarrying for limestone.

Ampleben, Bansleben and Eilum were incorporated into the Kneitlingen municipality on 1 March 1974.
