= Wolfenbüttel (district) =

District in Lower Saxony, Germany

Coordinates: 52°10′N 10°35′E

- District
- Flag Coat of arms
- Country: Germany
- State: Lower Saxony
- Capital: Wolfenbüttel

Government
  - District admin.: Christiana Steinbrügge (SPD)

Area
  - Total: 722.33 km^{2} (278.89 sq mi)

Population (31 December 2022)
  - Total: 120,531
  - Density: 170/km^{2} (430/sq mi)
- Time zone: UTC+01:00 (CET)
  - Summer (DST): UTC+02:00 (CEST)
- Vehicle registration: WF
- Website: lk-wolfenbuettel.de

Wolfenbüttel is a district in southeastern Lower Saxony, Germany. Neighboring districts are (clockwise from the north) the district-free City of Braunschweig, the district of Helmstedt, the district of Harz in Saxony-Anhalt, and the districts of Goslar, Hildesheim and Peine. The district-free city of Salzgitter cuts through the district of Wolfenbüttel in the southwest.

== Geography ==
The Oker River enters the district in the south, runs through the city of Wolfenbüttel (the district seat), and exits to the northwest.

== History ==
The district was created in 1832 when the Duchy of Brunswick was subdivided into six districts. It remained unchanged until 1941 when the Salzgitter-Verordnung ("Salzgitter Ordinance" creating the city of Salzgitter) took effect and removed 20 municipalities from the district; in return, 10 municipalities from the (then) District of Marienburg were turned over to Wolfenbüttel. When the district boundaries changed again in 1974 (as part of administrative reforms), parts of the former District of Brunswick were added to Wolfenbüttel. Additionally, several municipalities—most notably the city Bad Harzburg—were exchanged with the neighboring District of Goslar.

== Partnerships ==
The district has partnerships with the French city of Cachan, the County Borough of Rhondda Cynon Taff in Wales, and the District of Września in Poland.

== Coat of arms ==
The lion at the top of the coat of arms represents the House of Welf, the ruling house of the Duchy of Brunswick from the 13th century. The ears in the bottom symbolise the district's mostly agricultural character.

== Towns and municipalities ==
Clickable map of towns and municipalities in the district

| Towns | Samtgemeinden |
|---|---|---|---|
| 1. Wolfenbüttel; Free municipalities: 1. Cremlingen; 2. Schladen-Werla | 1. Baddeckenstedt; 1. Baddeckenstedt^{1}; 2. Burgdorf; 3. Elbe; 4. Haverlah; 5. Heere; 6. Sehlde | 2. Elm-Asse; 1. Dahlum; 2. Denkte; 3. Hedeper; 4. Kissenbrück; 5. Kneitlingen; 6. Remlingen-Semmenstedt; 7. Roklum; 8. Schöppenstedt^{1, 2}; 9. Uehrde; 10. Vahlberg; 11. Winnigstedt; 12. Wittmar | 3. Oderwald; 1. Börßum^{1}; 2. Cramme; 3. Dorstadt; 4. Flöthe; 5. Heiningen; 6. Ohrum; 4. Sickte; 1. Dettum; 2. Erkerode; 3. Evessen; 4. Sickte^{1}; 5. Veltheim |
| | ^{1}seat of the Samtgemeinde; ^{2}town |
