= Bundesgesellschaft für Endlagerung =

German federally owned company

Bundesgesellschaft für Endlagerung mbH
- Type: GmbH
- Founded: July 2016
- Headquarters: Peine, Lower Saxony, Germany
- Key people: Stefan Studt, Steffen Kanitzund Thomas Lautsch
- Services: High-level radioactive waste management
- Number of employees: c. 1900
- Website: www.bge.de

The Bundesgesellschaft für Endlagerung mbH (BGE; Federal Company for Radioactive Waste Disposal) is a German federally owned company based in Peine, Lower Saxony, Germany.

The BGE is tasked with high-level radioactive waste management, which includes looking for a site for a repository for high-level radioactive waste that will guarantee the best possible safety for one million years, as well as operating the Konrad and Morsleben final repositories as well as the Asse II and Gorleben mines.

It was established in July 2016, after a law on the reorganisation of the administrative structure in the area of final disposal for nuclear waste had passed. It is organised under private law as a GmbH, a limited liability company, with the sole shareholder being the German Federal Government.

Previously existing entities Asse-GmbH, the Deutsche Gesellschaft zum Bau und Betrieb von Endlagern für Abfallstoffe as well as parts of the Bundesamt für Strahlenschutz were merged into the BGE on 20 December 2017.

The organisational structure and tasks of the BGE result from the German Atomic Energy Act (paragraph 9a, sub-paragraph 3, sentences 2 ff. AtG) and the German Repository Site Selection Act (StandAG). Accordingly, it is the responsibility of the federal government to construct and operate repositories for radioactive waste. In order to fulfil this tasks the federal government shall establish a private corporation whose sole shareholder is the German Federal Government.

The federal government continues to exercise supervision through the Bundesamt für die Sicherheit der nuklearen Entsorgung, an independent federal agency operating under the Federal Ministry of the Environment, Nature Conservation and Nuclear Safety. The members of BGE's supervisory board were appointed in July 2017.

BGE has been the operator of the Asse II mine, the Konrad mine, and the Morsleben radioactive waste repository since April 2017. The company also has offices in Berlin and Gorleben.

In September 2020, the BGE published the interim report on sub-areas, in which an interim status of the scientific investigations into the potential repositories was presented. The public was informed about this in the magazine Insights 12/2021.

In its "Einblicke" magazine, the BGE provides information on the site search, Asse, Konrad and Morsleben repository projects. The magazine is distributed regionally or nationally as a press supplement and can be obtained by subscription.
