= Gorleben salt dome =

Salt dome

Coordinates: 53°02′53″N 11°21′20″E

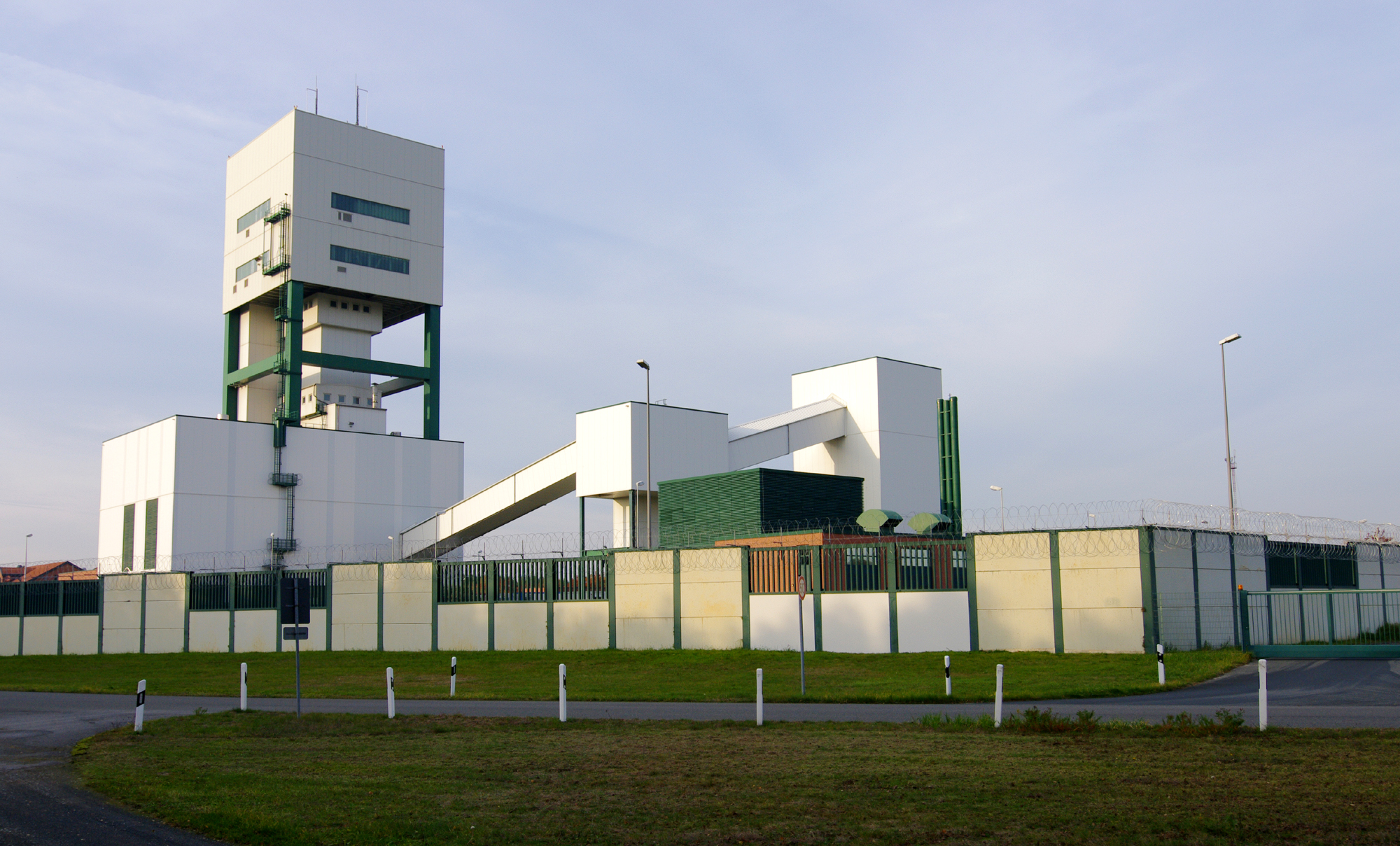
Headframe and parts of the buildings at the Gorleben salt dome

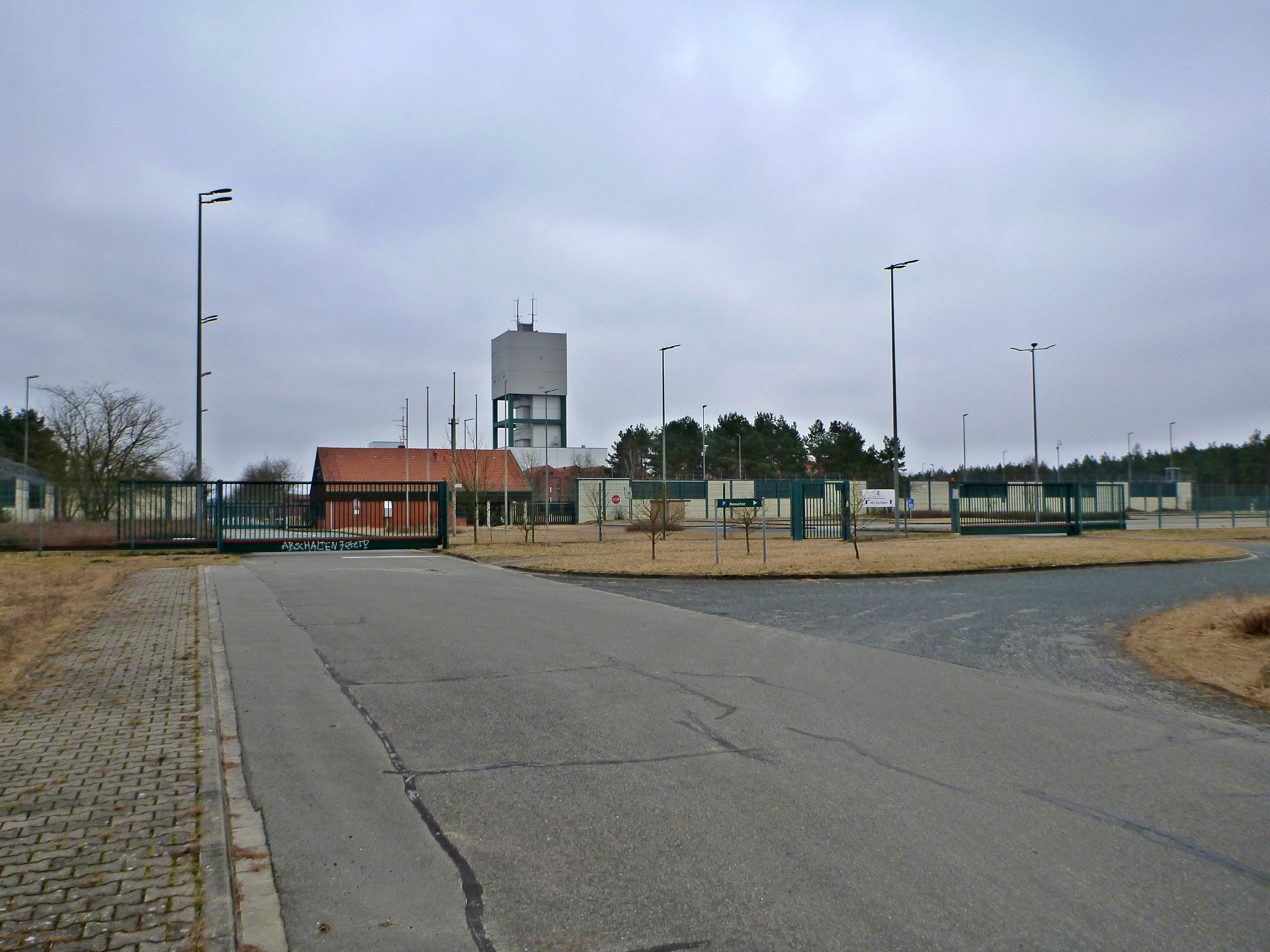
Main entry to the pilot mine Gorleben

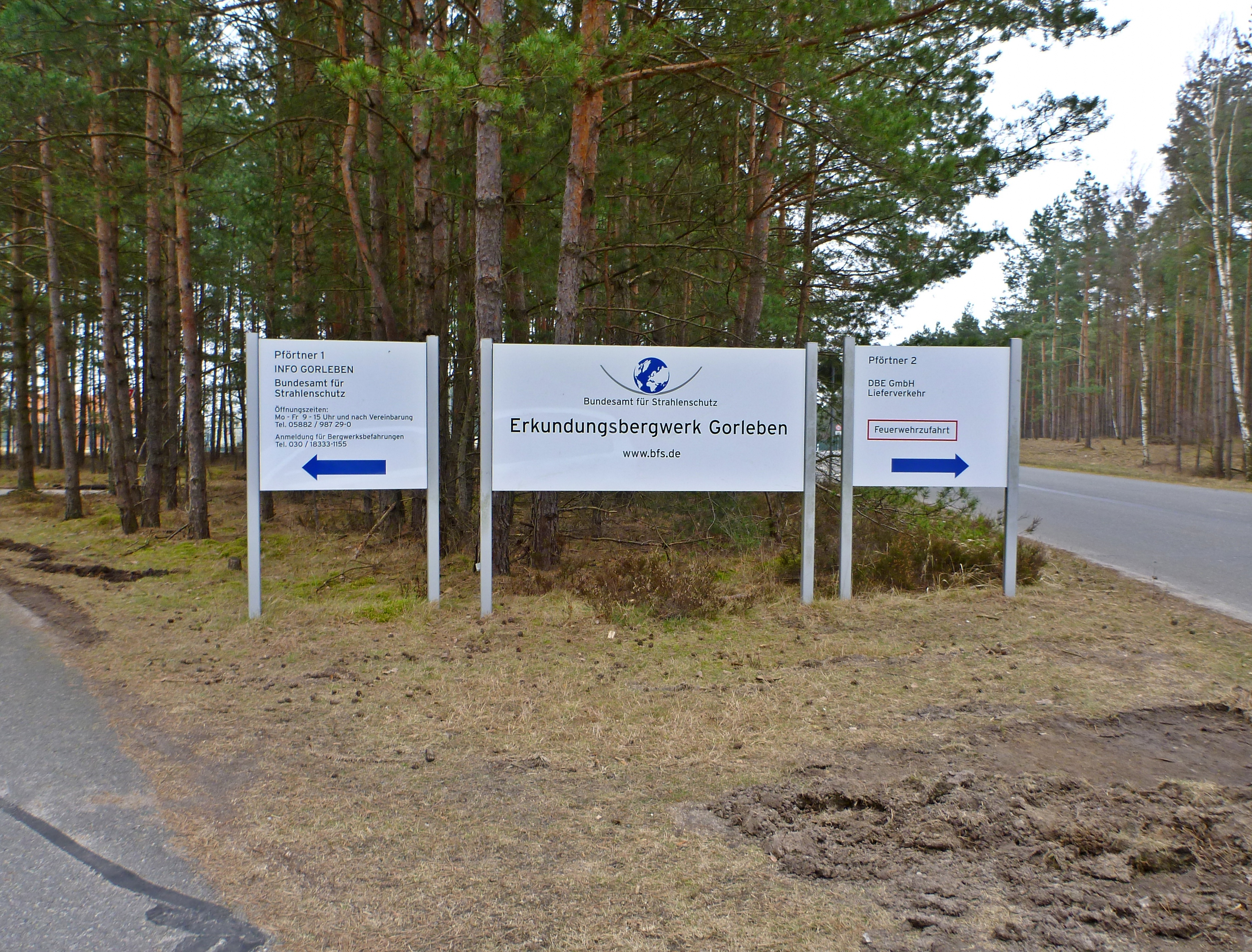
Entrysigns to the pilot min Gorleben and to the information centre Info Gorleben operated by the Bundesamt für Strahlenschutz

The Gorleben salt dome is a decommissioned deep geological repository in a salt dome in Gorleben in the Lüchow-Dannenberg district in the far north-east of Lower Saxony for low-, medium- and high-level radioactive waste.

== Site selection ==
At the end of 1973 the search began for a final salt dome storage. The plan was a repository for all types of radioactive waste in a salt dome. 24 salt domes were considered. The federal government asked the company KEWA (Kernbrennstoff-Wiederaufarbeitungs-Gesellschaft) to search for a location.

On July 1, 1975, the KEWA proposed three sites in Lower Saxony for further investigation: the salt domes Lutterloh, Lichtenhorst and Wahn. The location Gorleben is not advantageous in this category. The investigation of the sites began with drilling holes. In November 1976 the Lower Saxony cabinet called for the Federal Government to examine the three sites, so they could designate a location.

In February 1977 the Lower Saxony cabinet designated finally the Gorleben salt dome as a single location for the repository and waste disposal center. The choice of Gorleben was the work of a project group which investigated 140 salt domes within a few months. Of these 140 salt domes only four were proposed: Lichtenhorst, Wahn, Maria Glück (Höfer) and Gorleben. Of these, Gorleben was chosen. The selection criteria were among others, land use, population density, radiation and repository geology. Geoscientific arguments played only a small role. For example, the salt dome Höfer (Maria Glück) is too small for a repository but reached the last round of selection. The ultimate decision for Gorleben according to the former Lower Saxony Prime Minister Ernst Albrecht was mainly for structural reasons for the economic development of the zone. 1.5 billion Euros' worth of research has been conducted in the period 1979–2000 at Gorleben.

On hindsight it became clear that the original and methodologically correct approach, to investigate three potentially suitable salt domes in parallel and a comparative assessment of the results were abandoned by the choice for Gorleben. Security-oriented geoscientific arguments were ignored in the evaluation of Gorleben. The lack of transparency and accountability for the decision for Gorleben is still one of the reasons why the opposition to the location is so vehement.

== Surface exploration ==
The surface exploration of the Gorleben site began in April 1979 and lasted until 1983. The investigation covered drilling 44 boreholes in the salt table, geophysical investigations, including reflection seismic measurements, hydro-geological studies, approximately 500 outcrop- and groundwaterlevel drillings, four deep boreholes to approximately 2,000 m (6,600 ft) at the edges of the salt stock, two shaft boreholes to approximately 1,000 m (3,300 ft) depth to confirm the starting points of the selected slot, a seismic networkstation to monitor earthquake activity as well as numerous other studies.

The exploration results and their evaluation were carried out in two reports by the Physikalisch-Technische Bundesanstalt (1983) and the Bundesamt für Strahlenschutz (1990) and are summarized below.

It says (PTB 1983): "An initial assessment of the capping mass in terms of its barrier function for potential contaminated ground water shows that the occurring clay sediments in the central areas of the salt stock Gorleben lack the indication that it can function as a permanent barrier to prevent contamination of the biosphere."

This assessment still applies today and is supplemented by other negative site characteristics, such as anticipatory selective subrosion and the short time that is needed for the groundwater from the salt dome to reach the biosphere.

The expectations that one of the capping masses could be used as a barrier were not fulfilled. After that there was a change in safety philosophy: the importance of the capping mass as a barrier against the spread of radionuclides has been withdrawn and in return the salt dome alone is used as the crucial barrier. Based on this modification of the safety philosophy the underground exploration started.

== Underground exploration ==
The drilling for shaft 1 started in 1986 and in October 1996 the punch line was created between shafts 1 and 2 on the 840 m (2,760 ft) sole. The main objective of the underground exploration is the detection of rocksalts like top anhydrite which are required for the final storage. The exploration area 1 is largely open and under investigation. Comprehensive geoscientific investigations as well as geotechnical measurements and experiments were done. The results so far can be classified according to the Federal Institute for Geosciences and Natural Resources (BGR 1998) as follows:

- In the border zone between the core and the southern salt dome flank are heavily deformed layers and their thickness is reduced. Areas of missing top anhydrite and accompanying layers. The top anhydrite is decomposed into individual plates. Larger isolated solutions and gas reserves are possible in the top anhydrite layers.
- Between the core zone and the northern salt dome flank the border zones are laid in folds, and the layers involved are still largely in its original sedimentary form. The topanhydrite is broken, but not decomposed into individual layers.
- Core zone of the salt stocks with top salt: Here is a simple solution without solutions and gas reserves.
- In the boreholes located in areas near the border area of Zechstein 2/Zechstein 3 intensive folding of the layers with high reduction of thickness occurs. In the border region Staßfurt to Zechstein 3 are partially disorders healed by secondary rock salts. Limited solution and gas can occur in the disturbed areas but without connections to the salt levels.

== The Gorleben moratorium ==
In the agreement between the federal government and electric utility companies on June 14, 2000, in addition to the nuclear power phase-out a moratorium on the planned repository Gorleben was agreed on. After the agreement the exploration of Gorleben to clarify conceptual and safety issues was suspended for at least three years with a maximum of ten years.

The prototype for final storage to clarify conceptual and safety issues Schacht Asse II came in the news in 2008 about brine contaminated with radioactive caesium-137, plutonium and strontium.

== Decommissioning ==
Federal Environment Ministry announced in September 2021 that the facility was going to be decommissioned and backfilled.

== See also ==
- Repository for radioactive waste Morsleben
- Schacht Konrad
- Waste Isolation Pilot Plant, Carlsbad, NM
