= Deutsche Gesellschaft zum Bau und Betrieb von Endlagern für Abfallstoffe =

The Deutsche Gesellschaft zum Bau und Betrieb von Endlagern für Abfallstoffe mbH (DBE) (The German Society for the construction and operation of waste repositories) was a company that was owned by the federal government of Germany and was responsible for planning, construction and operation of facilities for geological disposal of radioactive waste. The company was founded in 1979 and based in Peine. In December 2017, it was merged with the repository division of the Federal Office for Radiation Protection (Bundesamt für Strahlenschutz, BfS) to form the Bundesgesellschaft für Endlagerung (BGE, Federal Company for Radioactive Waste Disposal).

The company employed approximately 570 employees and was 75% owned by the Gesellschaft für Nuklear-Service (GNS).

DBE was responsible for planning, construction and operation of the facilities repository for radioactive waste Morsleben, Schacht Konrad and the Salt dome Gorleben for securing and disposal of radioactive waste on behalf of the Federal Republic of Germany.

== DBE Technology GmbH ==
The DBE Technology GmbH was a 100% subsidiary of the DBE. The DBE Technology GmbH was founded in 2000 to the powers of the DBE by the federal government outside the tasks in national and international projects with a focus on management of radioactive waste to and use. The company's headquarters is in Peine (Lower Saxony).

== See also ==
- Deep geological repository
