= Klaus Kühn =

German mining engineer and professor (born 1938)

Klaus Kühn (born 1938) is a German mining engineer and emeritus professor at the Clausthal University of Technology. He is regarded as one of the leading German experts on the disposal of radioactive waste and was director of the Institut für Tieflagerung (IfT; engl. Institute for Underground Storage) in Clausthal-Zellerfeld from 1973 to 1995. His field of expertise is the disposal of pollutants from a mining and safety engineering perspective. In professional circles he was sometimes referred to as the "Salzpapst" ("Salt Pope").

== Early life and education ==
Kühn was born in Lichtenstein, Saxony. He completed his Abitur in 1957 in Marl, Westphalia. He studied mining engineering at the Clausthal University of Technology, receiving his diploma in 1963. In 1968 he obtained his doctorate (Dr.-Ing.) at Clausthal with a dissertation on the geochemistry of nickel and cobalt.

== Career ==
In 1965 Kühn became one of the first scientific staff members at the newly founded Institut für Tieflagerung (Institute for Underground Storage), operated by the Gesellschaft für Strahlenforschung (GSF, today Helmholtz Zentrum München). After 1995 he became scientific director of the Asse research mine, where almost all in-situ studies on the disposal of radioactive waste in Germany were conducted.

From 1987 Kühn also held a professorship as honorary professor at the Clausthal University of Technology, a position he retained until his retirement in 2003.

Kühn was a member of the German Reaktor-Sicherheitskommission (RSK; engl. Reactor Safety Commission) for the field of radioactive waste disposal (“Endlagerung”) between 1983 and 1998. He also served on numerous international expert committees, including those of the International Atomic Energy Agency (IAEA), the Nuclear Energy Agency (NEA) of the OECD, and the European Commission.

Starting in 2009, a parliamentary investigative committee of the Landtag of Lower Saxony examined also the Asse II shaft facility. The committee was tasked, among other things, with clarifying what had been stored in the Asse and which criteria had been applied in selecting Asse II as a research site. On Thursday (November 5, 2009), Klaus Kühn appeared before the investigative committee on the Asse nuclear waste repository in the state parliament in Hanover. In October 2012, the committee presented its final report.

According to the historian Detlev Möller, quoted by Deutschlandfunk, who wrote his 390-page dissertation on the history of the Asse, Klaus Kühn belonged to a small circle of those responsible for Asse who "fooled the Republic":

He deceived, because together with the others he deliberately did not speak about the risks of Asse II. They were discussed internally, perhaps only partially recorded in files, but externally there was no mention of the dangers associated with using this old mine.

From today’s perspective, the former potash and salt mine Asse II is one of the major nuclear policy failures in Germany.

In his laudatio for the Wendell D. Weart Prize, awarded for Professor Klaus Kühn's lifetime achievements, Dr. Weart (1932-2024) thanked Professor Kühn for his advice on the research at the American experimental underground repository for radioactive waste: “The American expert panel reviewing a potential repository site in the Yucca Mountains consulted him several times. For the operators of the American experimental repository, the experience gained in Germany proved to be very valuable.” ("Das amerikanische Expertengremium zur Begutachtung eines potentiellen Endlagerstandortes im Yucca-Gebirge konsultierte ihn mehrfach. Für die Betreiber des amerikanischen Versuchsbergwerks erwiesen sich die Erfahrungen in Deutschland als sehr nützlich.")

== Awards ==
- 1990: Federal Cross of Merit of Germany (Bundesverdienstkreuz).
- 2002: Wendell D. Weart Prize for lifetime achievement in nuclear waste disposal research.
- 2005: Honorary membership of the Kerntechnische Gesellschaft (KTG).

== Selected publications ==
- Zur Geochemie von Nickel und Kobalt, Clausthal 1968 (doctoral dissertation).
- Klaus Kühn, Walter Diefenbacher, Helmut Krause, H. Schmidt: Disposal of solidified high-level radioactive wastes in the Asse Salt Mine, Karlsruhe: Gesellschaft für Kernforschung, 1972. Paper Presented at the Symposium on the Management of Radioactive Wastes from Fuel Reprocessing, OECD-NEA and IAEA, Paris, November 27 - Dec. 1, 1972. Gesellschaft für Kernforschung, 1972
- Clausthaler Kolloquium zur Endlagerung 2003 und Ehrenkolloquium zum 65. Geburtstag von Prof. Dr.-Ing. Klaus Kühn, Clausthal-Zellerfeld: Papierflieger, 2004.
- Kühn, K., Klarr, K. & Borchert, H. (1967): Studie über die bisherigen Laugenzuflüsse auf den Asse-Schächten und die Gefahr eines Wasser- oder Laugeneinbruchs in das Grubengebäude der Schachtanlage Asse II.- GSF, 1.11.1967

Some of his early papers Kühn published together with Dipl.-Ing. Egon Albrecht, the Technical Director of the Institut für Tieflagerung der Gesellschaft für Strahlen- und Umweltforschung [nstitute for Deep Geological Disposal of the Society for Radiation and Environmental Research] (GSF) (now: Helmholtz-Zentrum) and others:

- Klaus Kühn, Egon Albrecht: Versuchslagerung schwachradioaktiver Abfallstoffe im Salzbergwerk Asse. In: Atom und Strom, vol. 17, 1971, pp. 134–137.
- Albrecht, E., Krause, H., Kühn, K. & Ramdohr, H. (1966): Sicherheitsstudien zu den Forschungsarbeiten und der Versuchslagerung niedrig radioaktiver Abfälle im ehemaligen Salzbergwerk Asse II.- GSF Stand 1.11.1966: 58 S, 24 Abb.
- Albrecht, E., Krause, H., Kühn, K. & Ramdohr, H. (1966): Sicherheitsstudien zu den Forschungsarbeiten und der Versuchslagerung niedrig radioaktiver Abfälle im ehemaligen Salzbergwerk Asse II.- GSF Stand 1.11.1966: 58 S, 24 Abb..

== Personal life ==
Kühn is married and has two children. He has been a member of the Rotary Club Clausthal-Zellerfeld since 1970 and served as its president in 1998/99.

== See also ==
- Asse II mine (Water inflow)
- „Gorleben-Untersuchungsausschuss“ (in German)
- Arbeitskreis Auswahlverfahren Endlagerstandorte (AkEnd) (in German)
