= Remlingen, Lower Saxony =

Remlingen
- Ortsteil of Remlingen-Semmenstedt
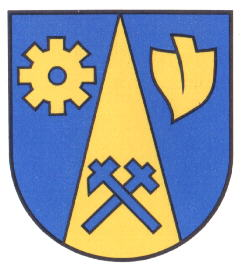
- Coat of arms
- Interactive map of Remlingen
- Location within Germany Location within Lower Saxony
- Coordinates: 52°07′N 10°40′E
- Country: Germany
- State: Lower Saxony
- District: Wolfenbüttel
- Municipality: Remlingen-Semmenstedt
- Subdivisions: 3 Ortsteile

Area
  - Total: 21.59 km^{2} (8.34 sq mi)
- Elevation: 138 m (453 ft)

Population (2015-12-31)
  - Total: 1,824
  - Density: 84.48/km^{2} (218.8/sq mi)
- Time zone: UTC+01:00 (CET)
  - Summer (DST): UTC+02:00 (CEST)
- Postal codes: 38319
- Dialling codes: 05336
- Vehicle registration: WF

Remlingen (German pronunciation: [ˈʁɛmlɪŋən]) is a village and a former municipality in the district Wolfenbüttel. Since 1 November 2016, it is part of the municipality Remlingen-Semmenstedt. Remlingen is close to Wittmar, which is an old village from miners in the Asse. There are 1824 inhabitants in the three villages of Remlingen (2015).

== Grave from the Neolithic Age ==
On the mountain Hoh there are significant grave arrangements from the middle Neolithic Age (approx. 3000 years B.C.), from a period in which the people were already established as farmers and cowmen in smaller, hamlet-like settlements. Residents owe this discovery to the Remlinger local curator Norbert Koch who, in 1987 with one of his regular field celebrations, found in the near surroundings a special stone concentration. Only 10 years later a test excavation took place by employees of the former Brunswick district government which proved the existence of a wall chamber grave. Comparable neolithic arrangements are up to now, above all, from Sachsen-Anhalt and Thüringen famously. This grave type was proved here for Lower Saxony and the north Harz foothills for the first time.

The excavation of 1998 offered possibility of insight into the lifestyle and the death culture of a Neolithic population. Archeologists and anthropologists helped themselves with the most modern technologies, digitizing three-dimensional documentation of wall walls, stone records plaster, and the rests of the charred rafter roof of the burial chamber.

The east–west orientation of the grave "which can be assigned, on the basis of typical vessels and decorated shards, to middle Germany Bemburger culture" was extraordinarily well-preserved. With the grave wall up to 50-cm-high from rocks foreign to this place, the stone paving and the clearly recognizable remains of charred wood rafters of a fallen down roof, permitted the reconstruction of the wall chamber. The access occurred from narrow east side. On the left and to the right of this input area long bones and parts of heads from cattle were found. From the east, the ground drops as far as the actual funeral area. Here, the remains of at least five people as well as other domestic animals, such as sheep, goats and pigs, could be documented. While initially the entire chamber was used, further burials were carried out only within the eastern half after clearing and burning the plant. In the west, the whole skeleton of a few-weeks-old dog puppy was found. The animal was deposited there together with a cup and a bovine jaw before the fire.

By other evaluation, above all, the excellently preserved charred wooden beams offered the possibility to determine the species of wood used in the roof structure beside a C14 date and also dendrochronology. The osseous findings of people and animals were examined in the institute for zoology / anthropology of the University of Technology of Brunswick; as far as it the condition of the bones permitted, genetic analyses were also carried out. Special investigations of the plant leftovers preserved in the burial chamber delivered clues and evidence of the menu of the contemporary population.

== Geography ==
Remlingen is located c. 12 km southeast of district Wolfenbüttel, Lower Saxony, Germany. This village has three villages as an understructure, there are:

- Remlingen (population 1,370)
- Groß Biewende (pop. 372)
- Klein Biewende (pop. 250)

== Asse ==
For several hundred years, salt has been mined in the mountain range of Asse. One of these mines, Schacht Asse II, is now used to store low- and medium-grade radioactive waste produced by medicine and nuclear power plants.
