= Steffen Kanitz =

German politician (born 1984)

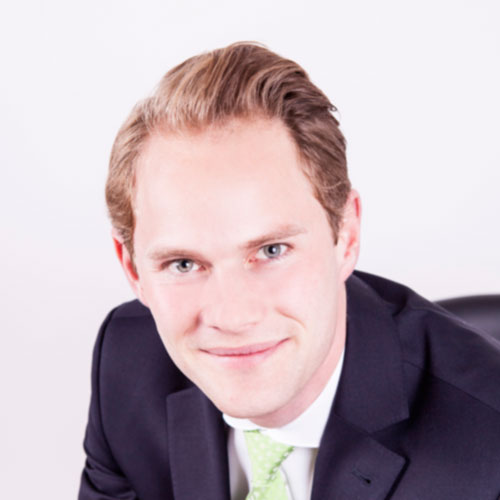
- Kanitz in the Bundestag

Member of the Bundestag
- In office 22 September 2013 – 24 October 2017

Personal details
- Born: 14 February 1984 (age 42) Dortmund, West Germany (now Germany)
- Citizenship: Germany
- Party: CDU
- Education: University of Münster
- Occupation: Politician

Steffen Kanitz (born 14 February 1984) is a German politician who served as a member of the Bundestag from 2013 to 2017, as a member of the Christian Democratic Union (CDU).

== Early life ==
Kanitz was born on 14 February 1984, in Dortmund, West Germany. In February 2009, he graduated from the University of Münster with a degree in business administration, specializing in corporate finance.

== Political career ==
Kanitz joined the Young Union in 2002, and became a member of the Dortmund Young Union's district executive committee in 2003, and its district chairman in 2005. He joined the CDU in 2005 and was elected deputy district chairman of the Dortmund CDU in 2007. From 2009 to 2020, he was district chairman of the Dortmund CDU and, since 2012, deputy chairman of the CDU Ruhr region district association. In July 2017, Kanitz was appointed acting state treasurer of the CDU North Rhine-Westphalia, and elected to the office in his own right in May 2018. He held it until 2023, when Patricia Peill was elected as his successor.

=== Tenure in the Bundestag (2013—2017) ===
In 2008, Kanitz was nominated as the CDU's candidate in the Dortmund I constituency for the Bundestag. In the 2009 German federal election, he received 27.5 percent of the first-preference votes. In the 2013 German federal election, Kanitz narrowly missed out on direct entry into the Bundestag in the Dortmund II constituency, receiving 32.2 percent of the first-preference votes. However, he secured a seat via the CDU's 20th place on the state list for North Rhine-Westphalia.

As a member of the Bundestag, Kanitz was a member of the Commission on the Storage of Highly Radioactive Waste from 2014 to 2016. While in the Bundestag, Kanitz was the deputy chairman of the Young Group, a CDU/CSU parliamentary group.

In the 2017 federal election, Kanitz unsuccessfully ran for re-election into the Bundestag, once more in the Dortmund II constituency. He received 28.1% of the first preference votes. Kanitz left the Bundestag following the conclusion of its legislative term.

== Business career ==
In 2017, after leaving the Bundestag, Kanitz was appointed to the supervisory board of the Federal Company for Radioactive Waste Disposal (BGE). From August 2018 to June 2023, he was a member of its management board. Kanitz has been a member of RWE's board of directors since June 2023, where he heads the nuclear energy division and the decommissioning of RWE's nuclear power plants.

== Personal life ==
Kanitz is a Lutheran. He is married and has two children.
