= Morsleben radioactive waste repository =

Deep geological repository in Saxony-Anhalt, Germany

Coordinates: 52°13′0″N 11°5′59″E

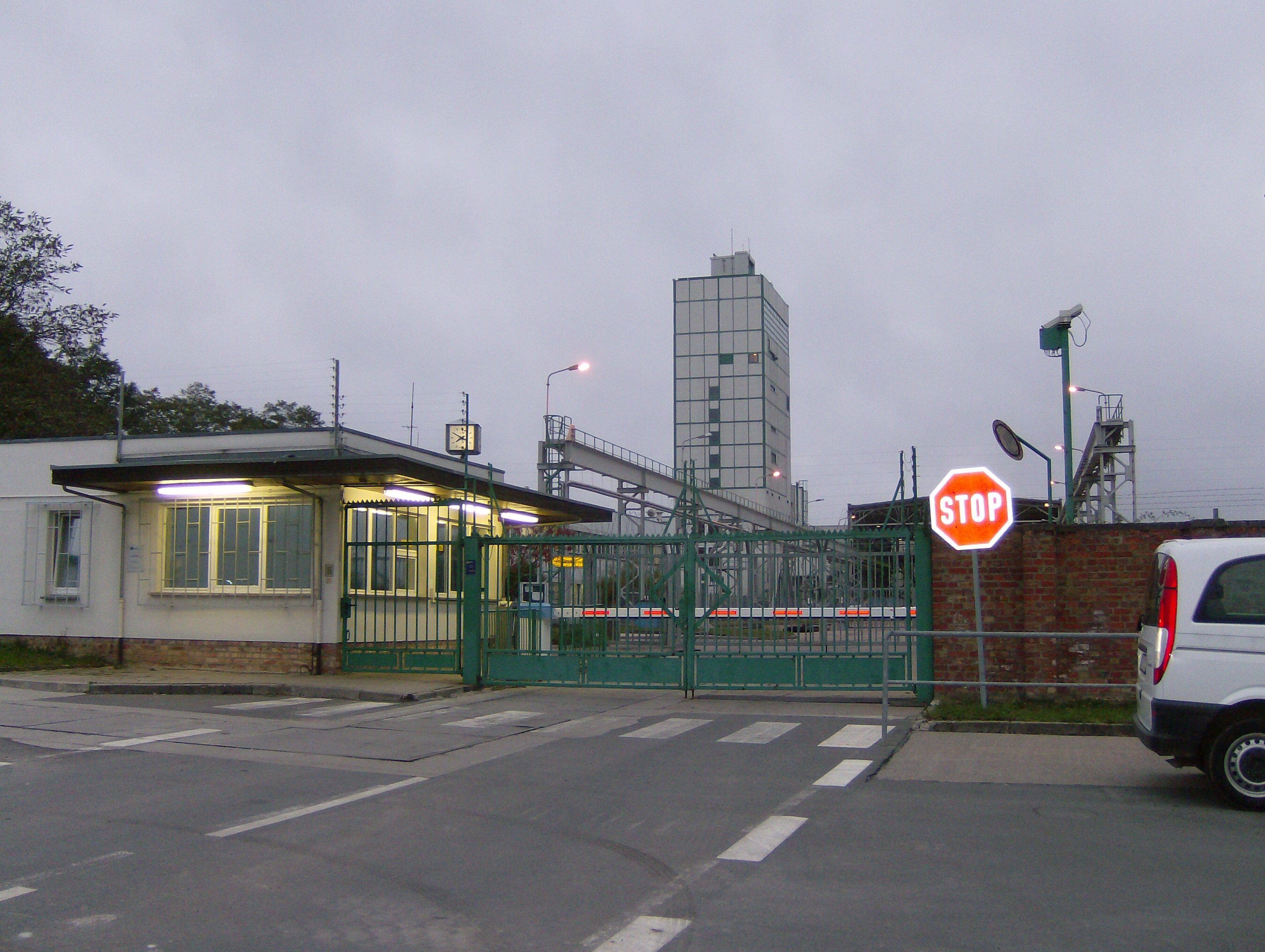
Main entrance to the repository for radioactive waste Morsleben

The Morsleben Radioactive Waste Repository (German: Endlager für radioaktive Abfälle Morsleben-ERAM) is a deep geological repository for radioactive waste in the Bartensleben rock salt mine in Morsleben, Börde District, in the federal state of Saxony-Anhalt, Germany.

== History ==
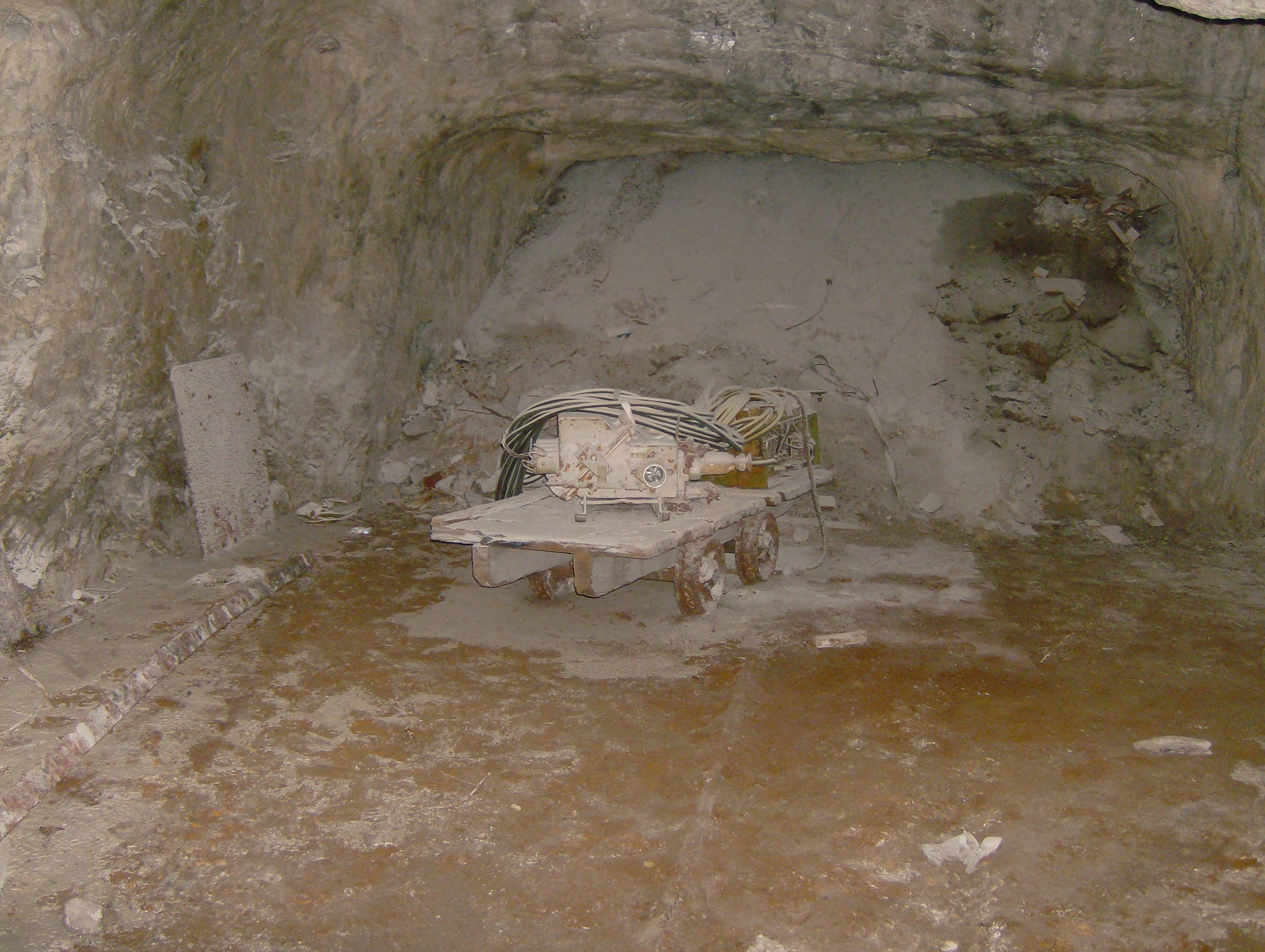
Historic wagon in the mine

After closure of the salt mining activities, Bartensleben was designated as a repository for radioactive waste by the former government of East Germany. Today, the shaft is operated by the Deutsche Gesellschaft zum Bau und Betrieb von Endlagern für Abfallstoffe mbH (DBE) under supervision of the Bundesamt für Strahlenschutz.

=== Potash ===
The salt mining industry in this region is over a century old, beginning with the first potash mining shaft, "Marie", in 1897. The "Bartensleben" shaft started between 1910–1912 and is currently 525m deep. The mine levels in "Bartensleben" are interconnected with "Marie" at depths 326, 426, 466 and 506 m. The main mine structure is between 320 and 630m depth.

=== Weapon production and forced labor ===
During the Third Reich, from February 1944 until April 1945, forced laborers and concentration camp prisoners from Ravensbrück, and Buchenwald were employed. From August 1944, 2,500 German, Soviet, Polish, Hungarian and French female concentration camp prisoners, also from the Neuengamme camp, were moved to the Beendorf camp. Initially this was a sub-camp of Buchenwald and subsequently of the Neuengamme camp. They worked in the salt mine.

They were forced to work in the tunnels of more than 400 meters depth on the production of components for the Me 262 jet aircraft and for rockets, including the V1 and V2. The components included parts for guidance systems. For secrecy the underground shafts "Marie" at Beendorf and "Bartensleben" in Morsleben were named "Bulldog" and "Polecat".

== Site selection ==
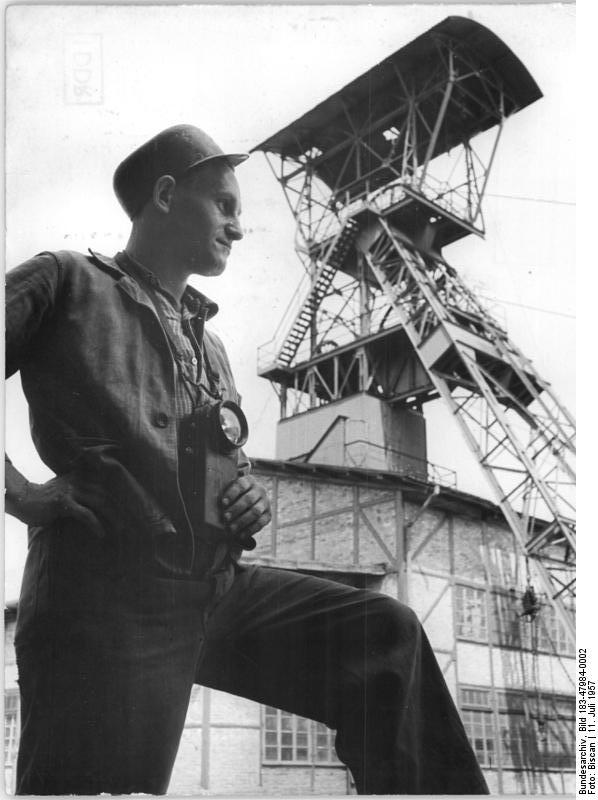
Mine Bartensleben in 1957

In 1965 the Staatliche Zentrale für Strahlenschutz (SZS) of East Germany (later: Staatliches Amt für Atomsicherheit und Strahlenschutz (SAAS)) started a search for a central storage location for all types of radioactive waste. During the selection process, ten sites were considered. Three of them came up for the final selection, which included the shafts "Bartensleben" (Morsleben) and "Marie" (Beendorf). In 1965 the decision was made to select Morsleben as the site for the "Zentralen Endlager Grube Bartensleben" (ZEGB). Important criteria were salt as a disposal medium, the size and availability of caverns and the early viability of the mine. The site permits were issued in 1972-73.

== Inventory ==
The first partial authorization for retrievable storage of 500 cubic meters of radioactive waste from the crowded central storage depot in Lohmen near Dresden, East Germany was granted in 1971/72. These deposits were made due to economic considerations ahead of the conversion operations (deployment authorization of 1974) of the salt mine as a disposal site. In the years that followed smaller quantities of radioactive materials were stored until the commissioning approval in 1978/79. On 20 June 1981 the temporary approval for continuous use was published, followed by the final license on 22 April 1986.

A request for a closure permit, under which the evidence of long-term security had to be provided, was not granted. In the late 1980s the preparations started for an additional approval stage for the storage of high level radioactive waste. In the wake of the unification of East and West Germany the approval process was halted.

In the first storage period from 1971 to February 1991, approximately 14,432 cubic meters of intermediate- and low level radioactive waste and 6,227 sealed objects with a total activity of about 0.29 PBq were stored. The waste came mainly from the Greifswald Nuclear Power Plant and Rheinsberg Nuclear Power Plant and from the ELBE of the Forschungszentrum Dresden-Rossendorf research reactor. The rest of the radiation and radioactive waste sources were products from the radionuclides used in research, medicine and industry and consisted of about 40% solid waste, particularly mixed and solidified evaporator concentrates, and almost 60% of liquid evaporator concentrate.

In the context of the German reunification the responsibility for the repository was transferred to the Bundesamt für Strahlenschutz (BfS).

In the period 1994 to 1998 approximately 22,320 m³ of radioactive waste with a total activity of 0.08 TBq alpha radiation and 91 TBq in beta and gamma radiation was stored in Morsleben. 88% of the waste came from the entire federal territory and the nuclear powerplants in Rheinsberg and Lubmin. 3% of the waste came from the national depots, and a further 9% from research institutions and other bodies. Again it was primarily mixed waste, evaporator concentrates, resins, waste under high pressure and sealed sources. The nuclear industry contributed 138 Million Euro in the period 1994-1998 for deposit costs.

Altogether, up to the termination of the storage operation in 1998 (including the period before reunification) at least 36,753 m³ of low and intermediate level radioactive waste was stored in Morsleben. With an additional 6,621 (other sources say 6,892) sealed sources, the total radiation activity is specified at about 0.38 PBq.

== Delayed closure ==
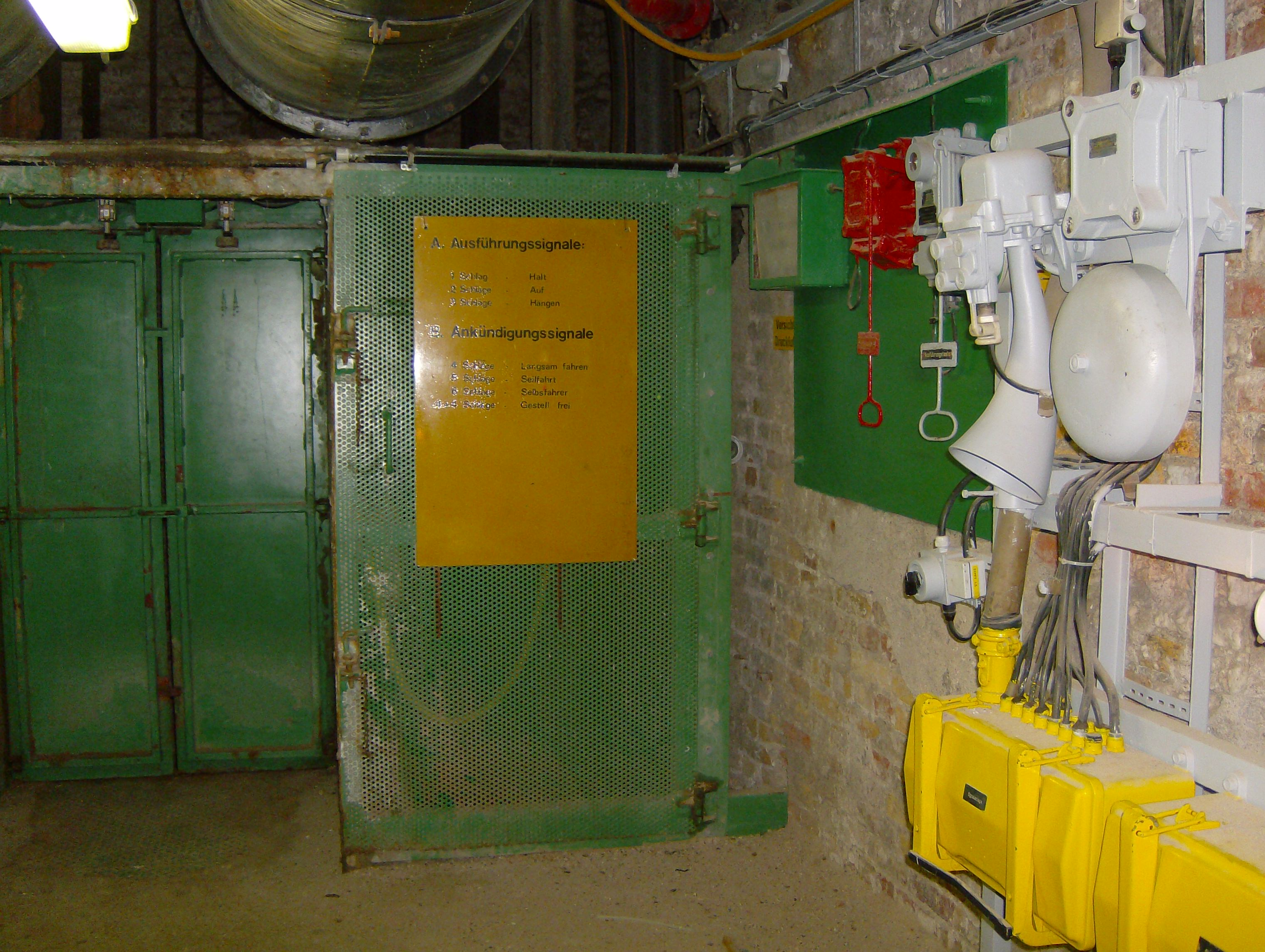
Filling station at 375 m depth

The request on October 13, 1992 from Saxony-Anhalt's Ministry of Environment to initiate a planning process under § 9 b AtG for the continued operation of the site from June 30, 2000 onwards was limited on May 9, 1997 to a decommissioning of the Morsleben repository. The Bundesamt für Strahlenschutz notified the planning authority on April 17, 2001 that it irrevocably waived approval of the regulations that permit the continued use of the site and acceptance of other radioactive waste and their storage in the Morsleben repository. The planning procedure for the closure will now be accelerated. Whether it succeeds to stabilize the mine and maintain long-term security is still unclear.

Since the suspension of nuclear waste storage in Morsleben in 1998 the stability of the salt domes has deteriorated to a state in which collapse could occur. Since 2003 480,000 m^{3} of salt-concrete has been pumped into the pit to temporarily stabilize the upper levels. In addition another 4,000,000 m^{3} of salt-concrete will be used to temporarily stabilize the lower levels.

The governmental costs for the remedial measures and closure of the mine are estimated at 2.2 billion euro. The work is carried out by the Deutsche Gesellschaft zum Bau und Betrieb von Endlagern für Abfallstoffe (DBE) which is 75% owned by the Gesellschaft für Nuklear-Service (GNS) with shared owners E.ON (48%), RWE (28%), EnBW (18.5%) and Vattenfall (5.5%).

== See also ==
- Nuclear decommissioning
- Schacht Asse II
- Salt dome Gorleben
- Schacht Konrad
