= Aschenberg =

- Village of Eschede
- Interactive map of Aschenberg
- Location within Germany Location within Lower Saxony
- Coordinates: 52°42′N 10°16′E
- Country: Germany
- State: Lower Saxony
- District: Celle
- Municipality: Eschede
- Elevation: 64 m (210 ft)
- Time zone: UTC+01:00 (CET)
  - Summer (DST): UTC+02:00 (CEST)
- Postal codes: 29361
- Dialling codes: 05145
- Vehicle registration: CE

Aschenberg is a small village in the district of Celle, Lower Saxony, Germany. It is part of the Ortschaft Höfer within the municipality of Eschede.
