= Gesellschaft für Nuklear-Service =

The Gesellschaft für Nuklear-Service mbH (GNS) carries out services in the field of radioactive waste disposal and decommissioning of nuclear facilities and operates through several subsidiaries interim storage depots for spent fuel and radioactive waste as in Gorleben and Ahaus. It was created in 1977 after the Gesellschaft für Nuklear-transporte mbH (GNT) was founded in 1974.

The GNS has multiple national locations and is internationally represented as well, its headquarters are at the Frohnhauser Straße in Essen. The company has approximately 700 (Stand 2014) employees and reported in 2007, a turnover of around 200 million euros.

The shareholders of the Gesellschaft für Nuklear Service are PreussenElektra (48%), RWE (28%), EnBW (18.5%) and Vattenfall (5.5%). The company is for 75% owner of the Deutsche Gesellschaft zum Bau und Betrieb von Endlagern für Abfallstoffe (DBE).

The company manufactures two dry cask storage systems, CASTOR and CONSTOR.
