= Semmenstedt =

- Ortsteil of Remlingen-Semmenstedt
- Coat of arms
- Interactive map of Semmenstedt
- Location within Germany Location within Lower Saxony
- Coordinates: 52°06′N 10°42′E
- Country: Germany
- State: Lower Saxony
- District: Wolfenbüttel
- Municipality: Remlingen-Semmenstedt

Area
  - Total: 11.71 km^{2} (4.52 sq mi)
- Elevation: 106 m (348 ft)

Population (2015-12-31)
  - Total: 676
  - Density: 57.7/km^{2} (150/sq mi)
- Time zone: UTC+01:00 (CET)
  - Summer (DST): UTC+02:00 (CEST)
- Postal codes: 38327
- Dialling codes: 05336
- Vehicle registration: WF

Semmenstedt (German pronunciation: [ˈzɛmənʃtɛt]) is a village and a former municipality in the district of Wolfenbüttel, in Lower Saxony, Germany. Since 1 November 2016, it is part of the municipality Remlingen-Semmenstedt.
