= Asse (hills) =

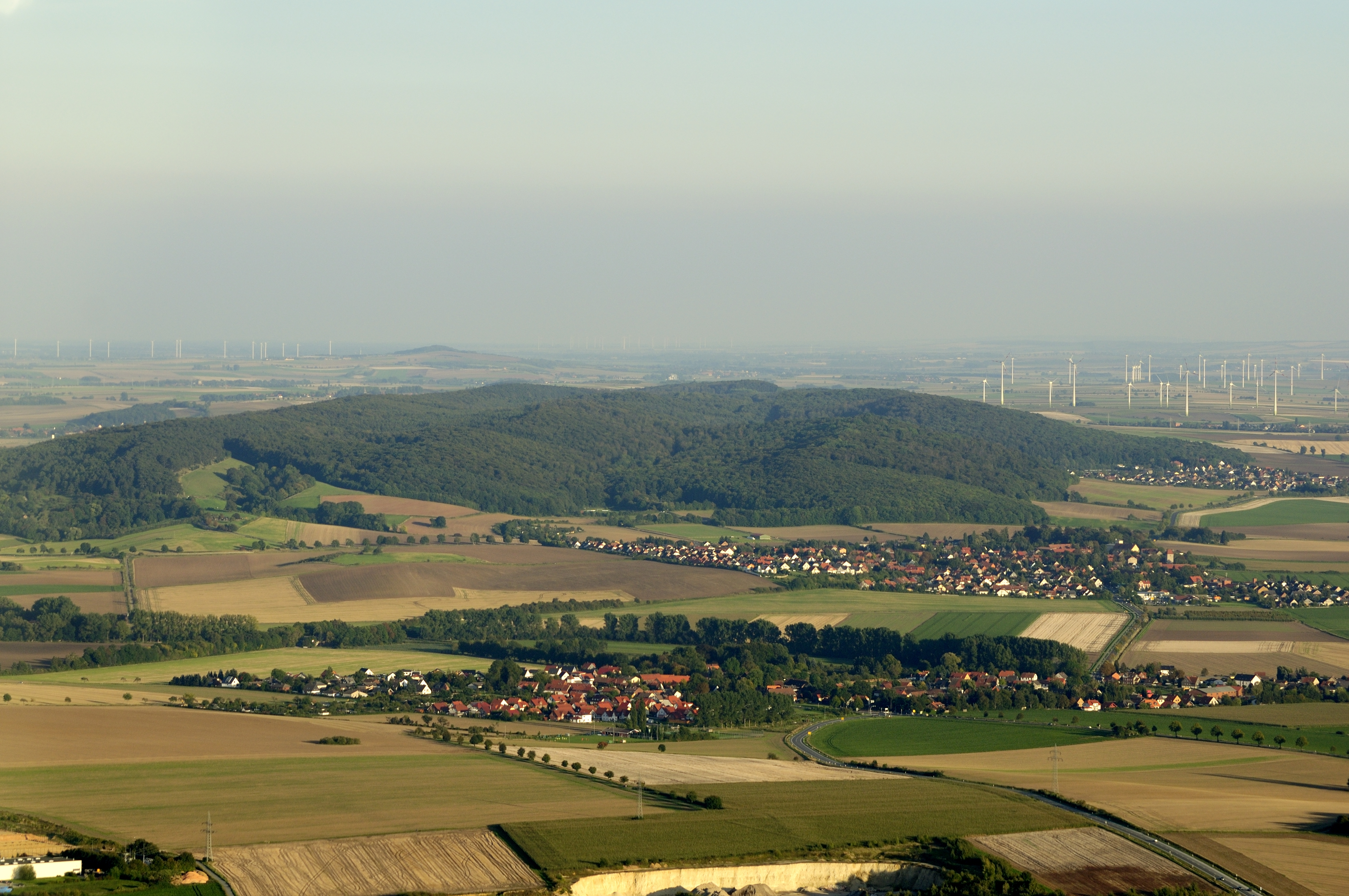

Highest point
- Peak: Remlinger Herse
- Elevation: 234 m above NHN

Geography
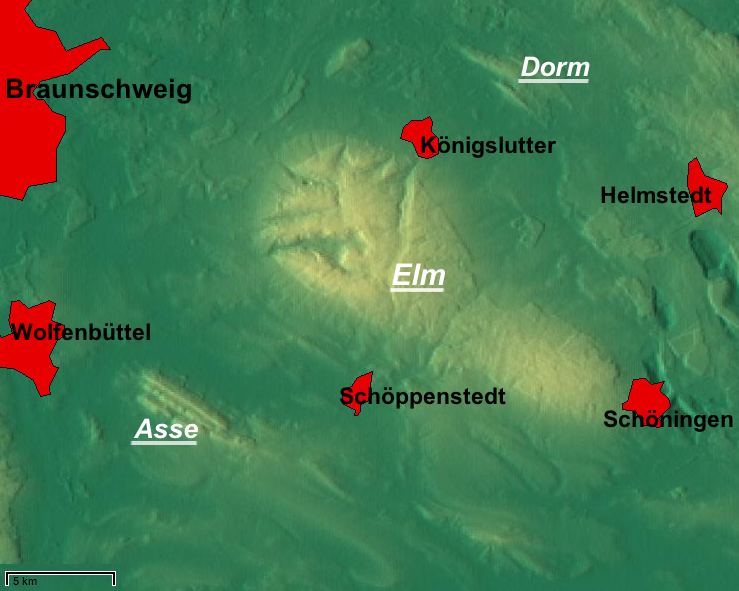
- Country: Germany
- State: Lower Saxony
- District: Wolfenbüttel
- Range coordinates: 52°08′25″N 10°39′00″E

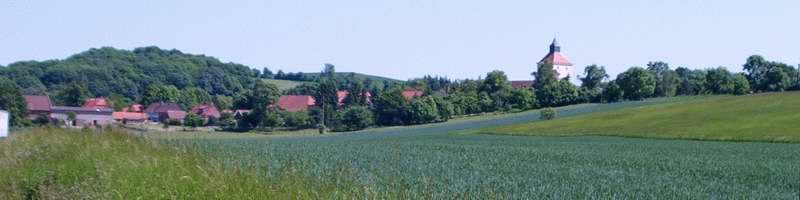
Groß Vahlberg in the Asse

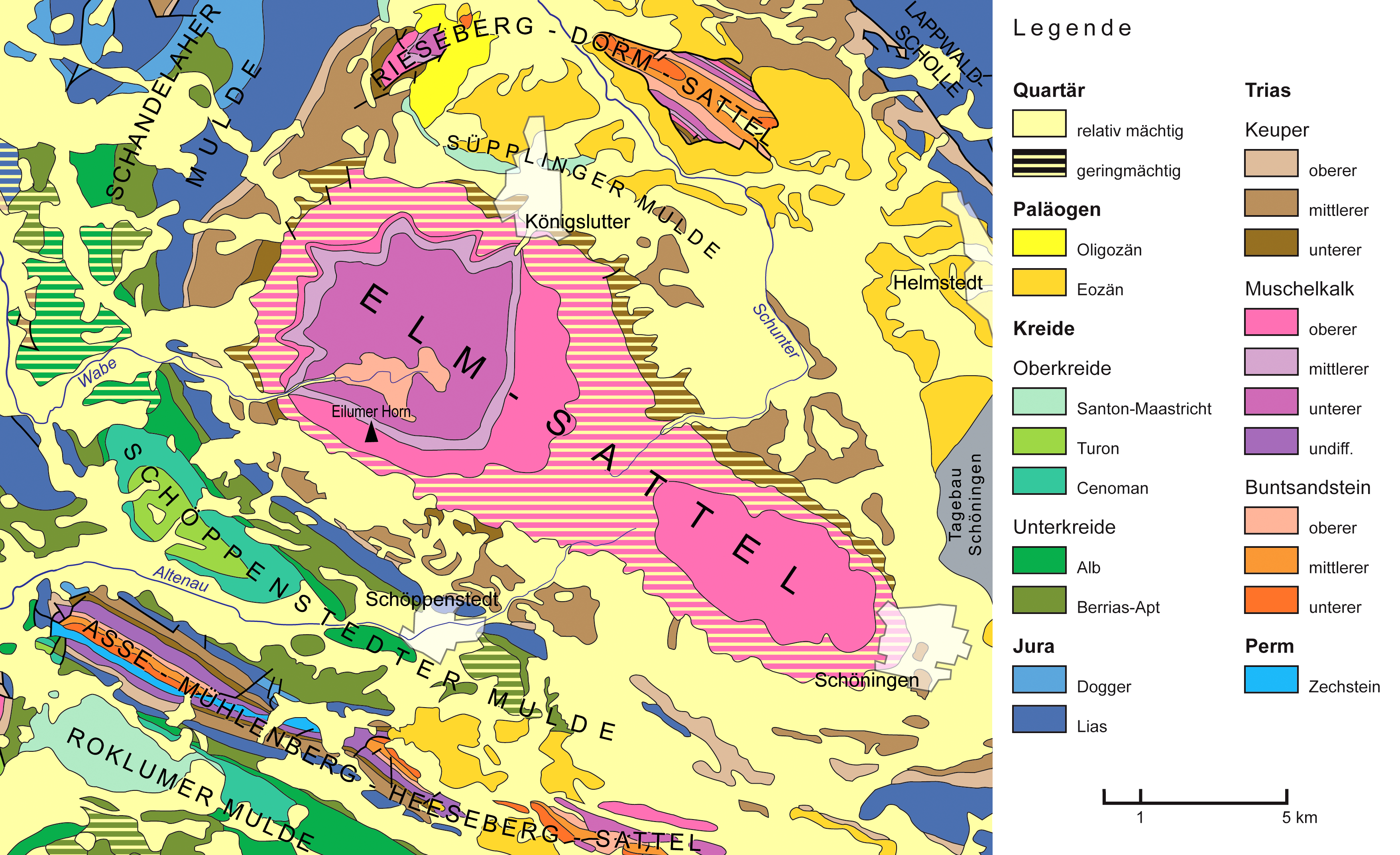
Geological map of the Northern Harz Foreland in the area of Brunswick-Wolfenbüttel-Helmstedt, with the Asse at lower left

The Asse (German pronunciation: [ˈasə]) is a small hill range in the district of Wolfenbüttel in southeastern Lower Saxony with a median height of 200 metres ASL; the highest elevation is the Remlinger Herse with a height of 234 m. There are more than 600 different plants found here; the Asse is mostly covered by trees. It has been inhabited since the 6th millennium BC by farmers coming from the Danube region.

For several hundred years, salt has been mined in Asse. One of these mines, Schacht Asse II, is now used to store low- and medium-grade radioactive waste produced by medicine and nuclear power plants.

== Administration ==
Administratively, the Asse is shared by the following villages:

- Mönchevahlberg
- Groß Vahlberg
- Klein Vahlberg
- Remlingen
- Wittmar
- Groß Denkte

The villages on the southern edge of the Asse belongs to Samtgemeinde Asse.

== Hills and high points ==
The hills and high points of the Asse include the following– sorted by height in metres (m) above sea level (NHN; unless otherwise stated):

- Remlinger Herse (234 m), east of Wittmar, northwest of Remlingen
- Festberg (232 m), northeast Wittmar, west of Mönchevahlberg
- Asseburgberg (227.5 m), NNW of Wittmar
- Röhrberg (225 m), NNE of Wittmar
- Watzenberg (Watzeberg; 222.5 m), ENE of Wittmar
- Hinterer Eichberg (220 m), north of Groß Denkte
- Rothenberg (220 m), northeast of Wittmar
- Auf dem Klaare (216 m), north of Remlingen
- Mittlerer Eichberg (201 m), east of Groß Denkte
- Meescheberg (188 m), SSW of Klein Vahlberg
- Vorderer Eichberg (185 m), ENE of Groß Denkte
