= Remlingen-Semmenstedt =

- Municipality
- Location of Remlingen-Semmenstedt within Wolfenbüttel district
- Interactive map of Remlingen-Semmenstedt
- Location within Germany Location within Lower Saxony
- Coordinates: 52°07′N 10°40′E
- Country: Germany
- State: Lower Saxony
- District: Wolfenbüttel
- Municipal assoc.: Elm-Asse

Area
  - Total: 33.43 km^{2} (12.91 sq mi)
- Elevation: 138 m (453 ft)

Population (2025-12-31)
  - Total: 2,256
  - Density: 67.48/km^{2} (174.8/sq mi)
- Time zone: UTC+01:00 (CET)
  - Summer (DST): UTC+02:00 (CEST)
- Postal codes: 38319, 38327
- Dialling codes: 05336
- Vehicle registration: WF

Remlingen-Semmenstedt (German pronunciation: [ˈʁɛmlɪŋən ˈzɛmənʃtɛt]) is a municipality in the district of Wolfenbüttel, in Lower Saxony, Germany. It was formed on 1 November 2016 by the merger of the former municipalities Remlingen and Semmenstedt.

Five villages belong to the municipality (population 2022):

- Remlingen (1282)
- Semmenstedt (482)
- Groß Biewende (295)
- Klein Biewende (200)
- Timmern (172)
