= Gorleben =

- Municipality
- Location of Gorleben within Lüchow-Dannenberg district
- Interactive map of Gorleben
- Location within Germany Location within Lower Saxony
- Coordinates: 53°02′53″N 11°21′20″E
- Country: Germany
- State: Lower Saxony
- District: Lüchow-Dannenberg
- Municipal assoc.: Gartow
- Subdivisions: 2 Ortsteile

Government
  - Mayor: Herbert Krüger

Area
  - Total: 21.35 km^{2} (8.24 sq mi)
- Elevation: 20 m (66 ft)

Population (2025-12-31)
  - Total: 626
  - Density: 29.3/km^{2} (75.9/sq mi)
- Time zone: UTC+01:00 (CET)
  - Summer (DST): UTC+02:00 (CEST)
- Postal codes: 29475
- Dialling codes: 05882
- Vehicle registration: DAN
- Website: www.gorleben.de

Gorleben (German pronunciation: [ˈɡɔʁˌleːbn̩]) is a small municipality (Gemeinde) in the Gartow region of the Lüchow-Dannenberg district in the far north-east of Lower Saxony, Germany, a region also known as the Wendland.

Gorleben was first recorded as a town by the rulers of Dannenberg in 1360; there was a fort on the site. The name "Gorleben" probably comes from Goor ("silt"; in Slavic, however, Gor means "mountain") and leben ("heritage").

Gorleben is known as the site of a controversial radioactive waste disposal facility, currently used as an intermediate storage facility initially planned to serve with the salt dome Gorleben as a future deep final repository for waste from nuclear reactors. As of September 28, 2020 this is no longer the case as the entire area has been deemed unfit by 70 geologists in a national geographic survey for final repositories. It has attracted frequent protests from environmentalists since the 1970s.

== Geography ==
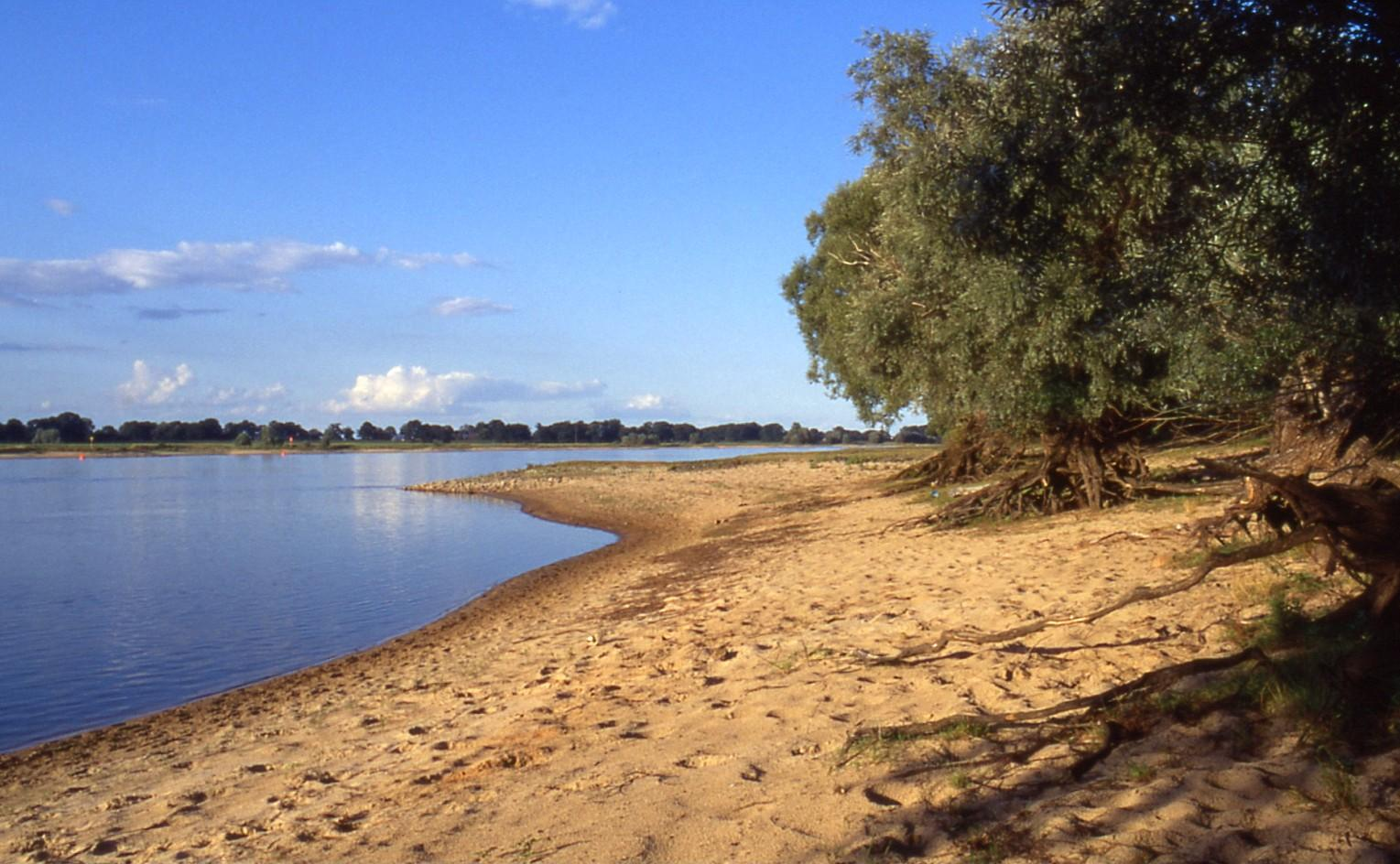
The Elbe near Gorleben

The small town is directly on the left bank of the Elbe river, about 20 metres above sea level. The Elbe river landscape spreads out to the east, north and northwest, protected as the Lower Saxon Elbe Valley Leas biosphere reserve. To the south, a large area of pine forest adjoins it, the Gartower Tannen. This is the largest contiguous privately owned forest in Germany, owned by Graf Bernstorff of Gartow, and is on a large hilly area which grew out of wind-borne sand in a periglacial process.

The entire region, up to the Drawehn chain of hills in the west, is within the Elbe glacial valley, the main run-off for melting glacial water from the last Ice Age. Biogeographically the area belongs to the Northeast German Lowlands.

There are some interesting points of natural history including the Höhbeck terminal moraine from the Wolstonian Stage which looms up from the middle of the flat Elbe Valley as a Pleistocene "island".

== Nuclear Waste Repository ==
The name "Gorleben" has become infamous both nationally and internationally because of plans to build a national deep geological repository for radioactive waste there, along with interim storage units. The waste comes from Germany's nuclear power plants, was reprocessed in France at La Hague, and the unusable remains then sent back to Germany in spent nuclear fuel shipping casks for final storage, according to the contract with the reprocessing company, Cogema.

Originally, more projects were planned by the nuclear energy industry, for example a reprocessing plant for nuclear fuel at Dragahn, to the west of Dannenberg, and a nuclear power station at Langendorf by the Elbe. However, both plans were rejected as impractical to carry out.

In woods around two kilometres to the southwest of Gorleben there are four different large plants: an interim storage unit for dry cask storage, a storage unit for radioactive waste which emits faint heat, a conditioning plant and a pilot plant in a salt dome.

=== Interim storage unit for radioactive waste ===
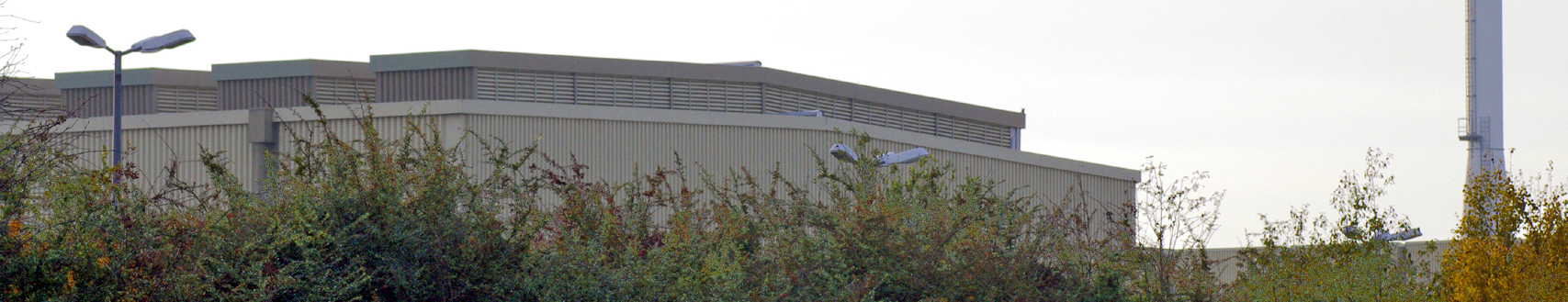
Gorleben transport container storage unit for highly radioactive nuclear waste

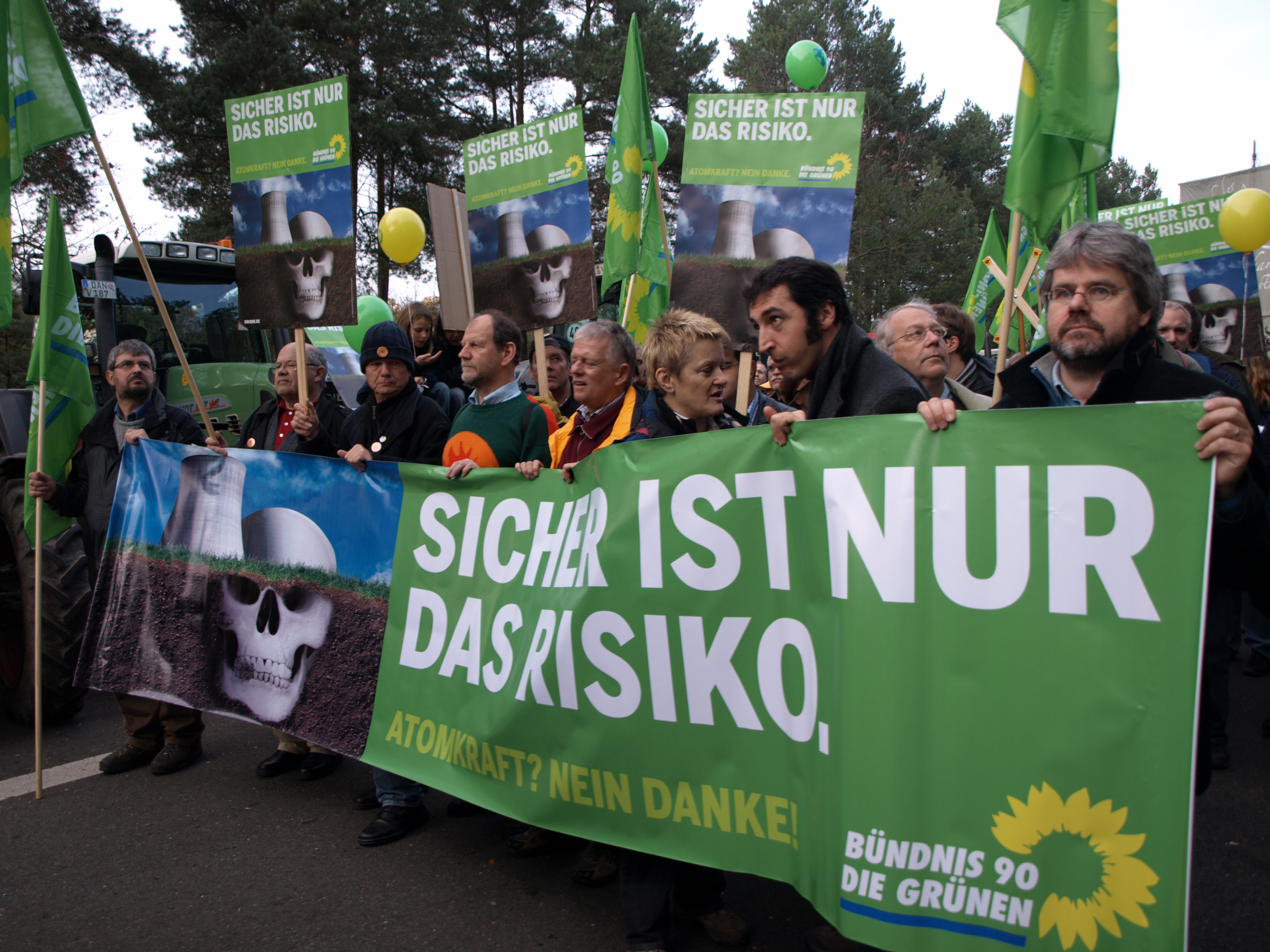
Anti-nuclear protest near nuclear waste disposal centre at Gorleben in northern Germany, on November 8, 2008.

Today in Gorleben there are two interim storage units for radioactive waste. The Gorleben transport container storage unit (Transportbehälterlager Gorleben) is used for short-term storage of spent fuel elements and for vitrified, highly radioactive waste from German nuclear reprocessing plants. The fuel elements and vitrified waste block containers are in dry casks standing in a hall above ground and cooled by the surrounding air. Permission has been granted to store 420 dry casks on the site.

In April 1995, the first shipments of nuclear waste were sent to the interim storage facility at Gorleben. They included spent fuel from several German reactor sites and high-level nuclear waste from reprocessing facilities in France. The anti-nuclear movement was able to concentrate its efforts on these so-called Castor transports, creating media mega-events that would dominate national media coverage for several days.

The first transport in April 1995 included a total of just two casks but mobilized 4,000 protesters and 7,600 police; the second transport in May 1996 included a single cask coming from the La Hague reprocessing plant and required a police force of 19,000. The third transport in March 1997 included a total of six casks, and it faced 10,000 protesters and 30,000 police.

As with earlier anti-nuclear protests in the 1970s and 1980s, at Wyhl and Brokdorf, these demonstrations turned very violent. The government's handling of these protests was often seen to be disproportionate and, in 1990s unified Germany, increasingly out of place, even by the broader public.

=== Gorleben long-term storage project ===
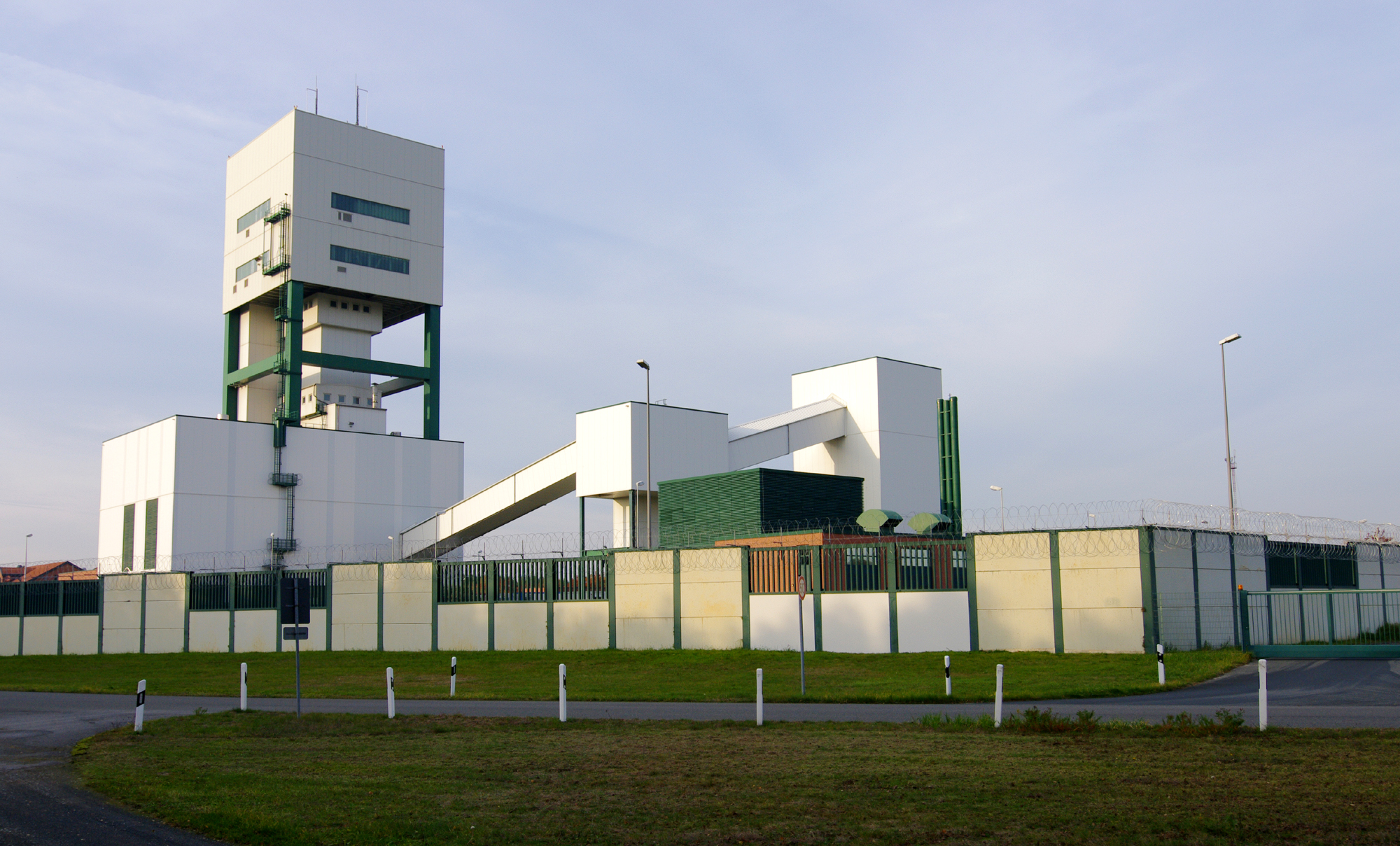
Gorleben exploration mine for a future long-term storage of highly radioactive nuclear waste

The salt dome under the ground near Gorleben was intended to become a long-term storage place for all kinds of radioactive waste. On the site, the German Society for the Construction and Management of Long-Term Waste Storage Units (DBE mbH) runs what is known as a "pilot plant", which previously was planned as a long-term storage site for highly radioactive nuclear waste. This plan has been abandoned.

In the past, however, this use was extremely controversial and it has been finally decided to not follow through with a final repository in Gorleben. The preliminary choice of Gorleben as a site was made in 1977 by the Minister-President of Lower Saxony, Ernst Albrecht of the CDU, based mainly upon political and economic criteria and particularly the proximity of the area at that time to the border with the GDR, and the sparse local populace.

Whatever the location, the basic choice of halite (rock salt) as a host rock for a final repository was a step which eliminated from the start any alternative locations such as the clay or granite formations favoured in other countries for this purpose. Specific exploratory geological drillings were carried out between 1979 and 1999, and from the early eighties the results showed that the Gorleben salt dome could actually be unsuitable because of its unstable roof rock and contact with the groundwater.

One example of this instability is the "Gorleben Rut", a gully made by melting glacial ice which runs as low as 320 m below the surface directly above the dome. The gully is composed of sandy, gritty material which conducts groundwater. This means that the roof of the dome, expected to be several hundred metres thick and made of heavy Oligocene clay layers, does not exist in this form at this spot. According to the German Office for Radiation Protection (BfS) this is the minimum required for any location to be suitable as a final repository, following their definition of a "multi-barrier system". These clay layers have been destroyed from below by the diapir of the salt dome as it was forced upwards by tectonics, and from above by material being carried away and filled in by Ice Age glaciers.

Another discovery made by the exploratory drilling was that saliferous groundwater moves both from the sides and the top of the salt dome towards the surface, meaning that if it came into contact with highly radioactive material, the result would be a contamination of the biosphere. If groundwater is in contact with the halite, another factor to be reckoned with is subrosion, i.e. cavities developing due to salt leaching. This could cause the roof to collapse, or sinkholes to form on the surface of the earth. There are numerous examples of this happening in salt domes all across northern Germany, including a ten-kilometre-long, deep depression over the northeastern part of the Gorleben salt structure itself; in this depression, for example, the 1.75 square kilometre Rudower See lake and the Rambower See formed; the latter is now fenland.

In 2010, Angela Merkel's center-right Federal Government lifted the moratorium and restarted the exploration process. Large-scale protests promptly resumed.

=== Pilot conditioning plant ===
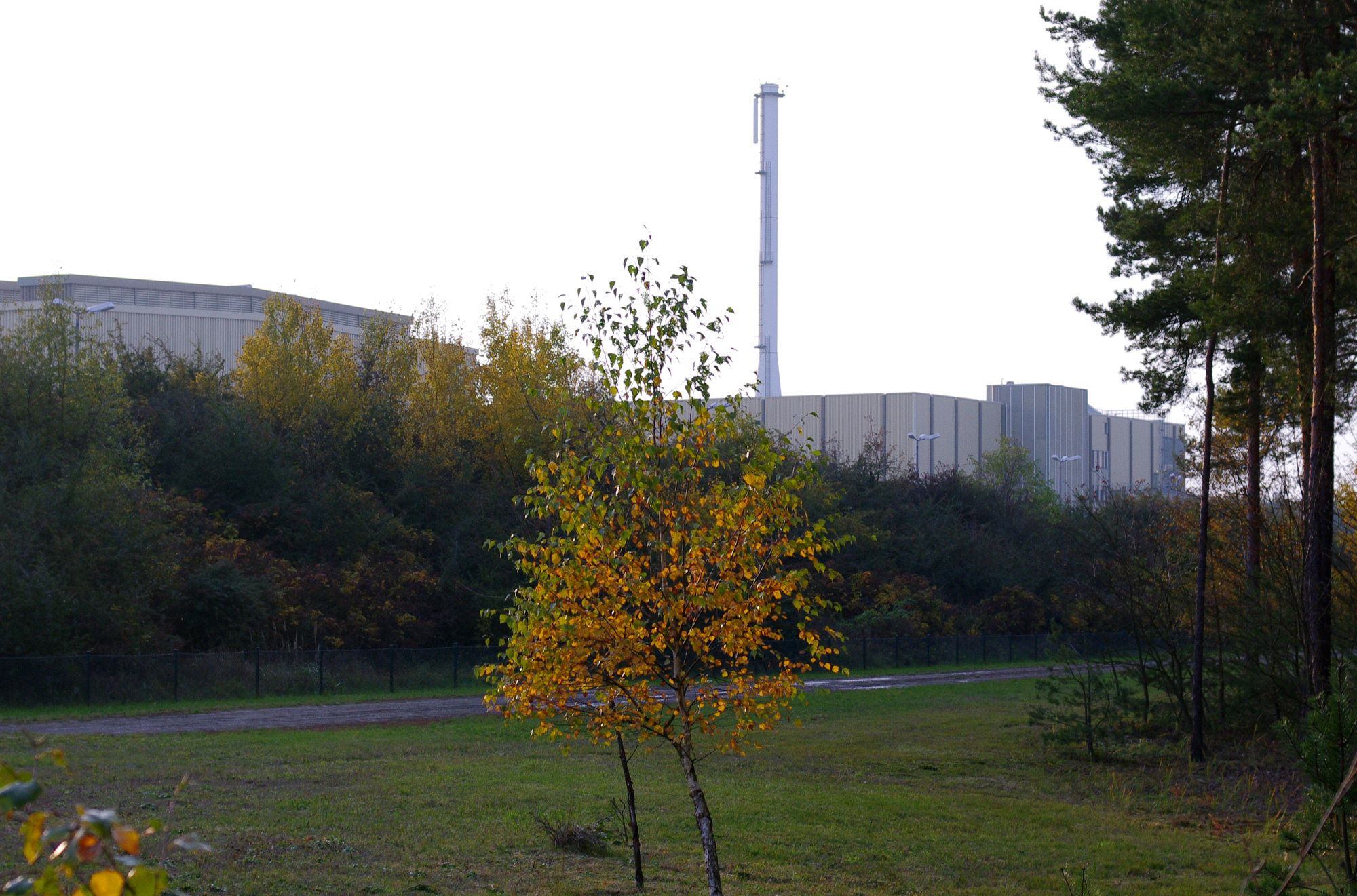
Gorleben pilot conditioning plant

Near the exploratory mine and the interim storage hall, there is still a "pilot conditioning plant". Here, tests are to be made of conditioning the fuel elements in order to store them in a deep repository, and also to reload the containers for the vitrified waste blocks into containers suited to long-term storage. The dry cask storage containers themselves are not suitable for long-term storage and can not be placed in the salt dome for technical reasons. However, at present the plant may only be used for repairing damaged containers, according to an agreement signed by the German government.

=== Dispute ===
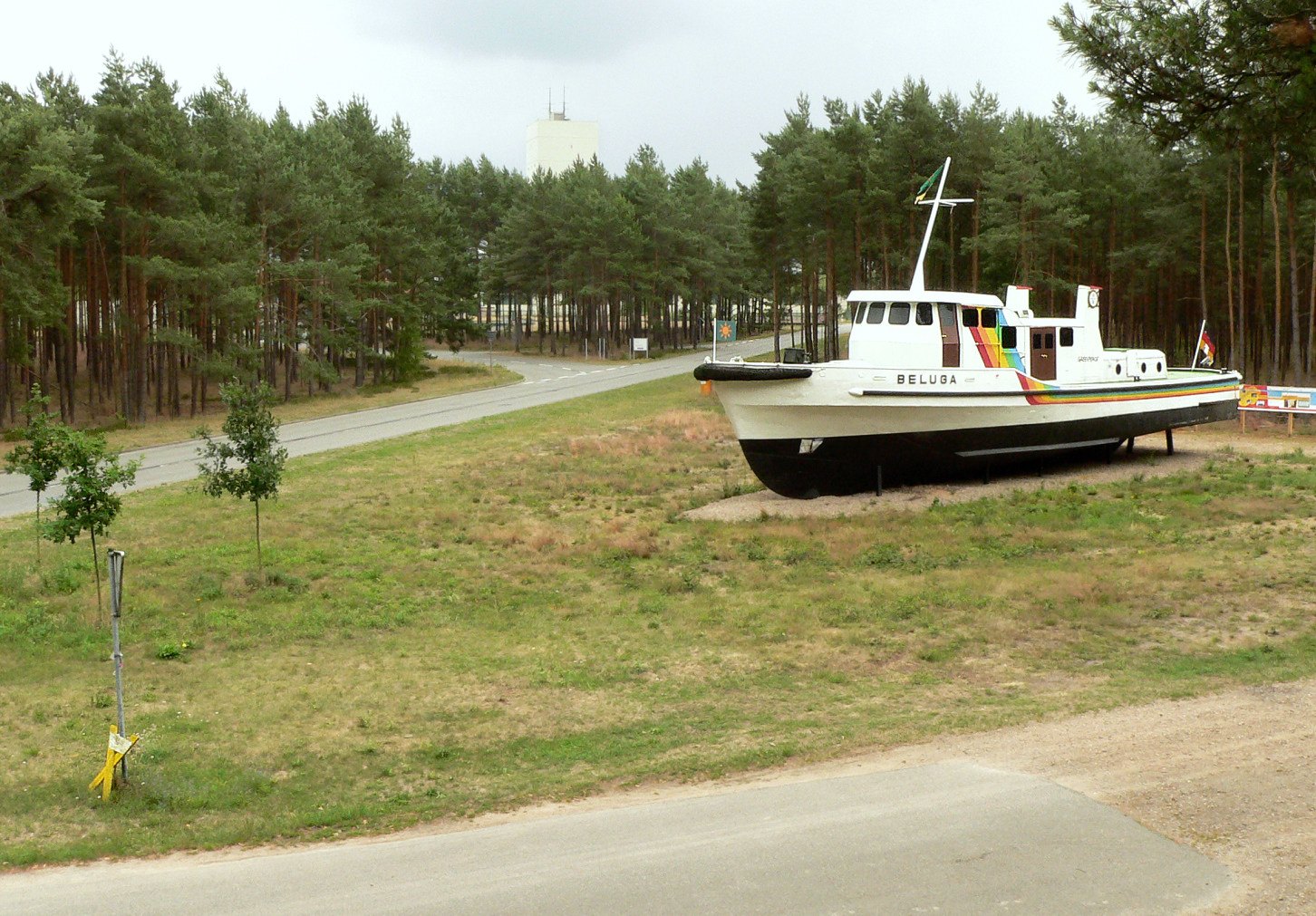
The MV Beluga in Gorleben as a memorial and protest against the proposed storage site.

Even while the interim storage unit and the first exploratory mine were being set up - the latter was once referred to by Jürgen Trittin (Green party) as illegal mining - there were protests by opponents of nuclear technology locally and nationwide.

On 23 May 1980 a micronation, the "Free Republic of Wendland" was founded symbolically by building a village of huts at the site of the exploratory mine. Gerhard Schröder, then the leader of the SPD youth organisation Jusos (later to become Chancellor of Germany), spoke out in support of the occupiers. On 4 Jun 1980 the police moved in and cleared out the encampment.

Today, protests still take place against nuclear energy and the plans for waste disposal at Gorleben: they reach a climax in the yearly transport of dry cask containers by rail and special lorries through northern France and Germany to the interim storage unit. For the last few years, this transport has usually been carried out in November; it is accompanied by a huge police presence. The Greenpeace ship MV Beluga is near the entrance to the proposed permanent storage site as a form of ongoing protest and memorial.

In November 2008, a shipment of radioactive waste from German nuclear plants arrived at a storage site near Gorleben after being delayed by large protests from nuclear activists. More than 15,000 people took part in the protests which involved blocking the route with tractors and blocking trucks with sit-down demonstrations.

The municipality of Gorleben and the Gartow administrative association both receive annual "compensation" payments known as Gorleben-Gelder (Gorleben funds). The nuclear industry and most of the CDU and FDP political parties, including Chancellor Angela Merkel, also support further exploration of the site with no search for alternative locations, and following this the use of the Gorleben salt dome as a national or even international final repository for highly radioactive nuclear waste.

== See also ==
- Bundesamt für Strahlenschutz
- Radioactive waste
- Dry cask storage
- Anti-nuclear movement in Germany
- Wyhl
