= Höfer, Germany =

Höfer
- Ortschaft of Eschede
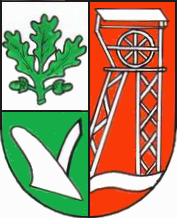
- Coat of arms
- Interactive map of Höfer
- Location within Germany Location within Lower Saxony
- Coordinates: 52°40′N 10°15′E
- Country: Germany
- State: Lower Saxony
- District: Celle
- Municipality: Eschede

Area
  - Total: 21.87 km^{2} (8.44 sq mi)
- Elevation: 64 m (210 ft)

Population (2006-12-31)
  - Total: 922
  - Density: 42.2/km^{2} (109/sq mi)
- Time zone: UTC+01:00 (CET)
  - Summer (DST): UTC+02:00 (CEST)
- Postal codes: 29361
- Dialling codes: 05145
- Vehicle registration: CE
- Website: www.hoefer-celle.de

Höfer is a village and a former municipality in the district of Celle, in Lower Saxony, Germany. Since 1 January 2014, it has been part of the municipality Eschede, of which it is an Ortschaft. The Ortschaft Höfer contains the villages Höfer, Aschenberg and Ohe.

Höfer has an abandoned mine named Mariaglück, about 910 m deep, from which the sum of 13.2 million tons of common salt and potash salt was mined between 1916 and 1977. As the maximum, in 1943 about 241,000 tons of salt were produced. The excavation left a hole of 5 million cubic metres. In World War II some military equipment was manufactured underground, safe from bombing raids.

Radioactive waste from the deep geological repository Schacht Asse II in the Wolfenbüttel district and ashes from waste incineration facilities, containing toxic metals, were frequently transported to the mine Mariaglück. In 2009, the district court of Lüneburg prohibited any further waste transport by issuing a preliminary injunction.

Höfer has its own volunteer fire brigade, an open-air bath, and a kindergarten.
