= Konrad mine =

Former iron ore mine in Salzgitter, Germany

Coordinates: 52°11′58″N 10°23′16″E

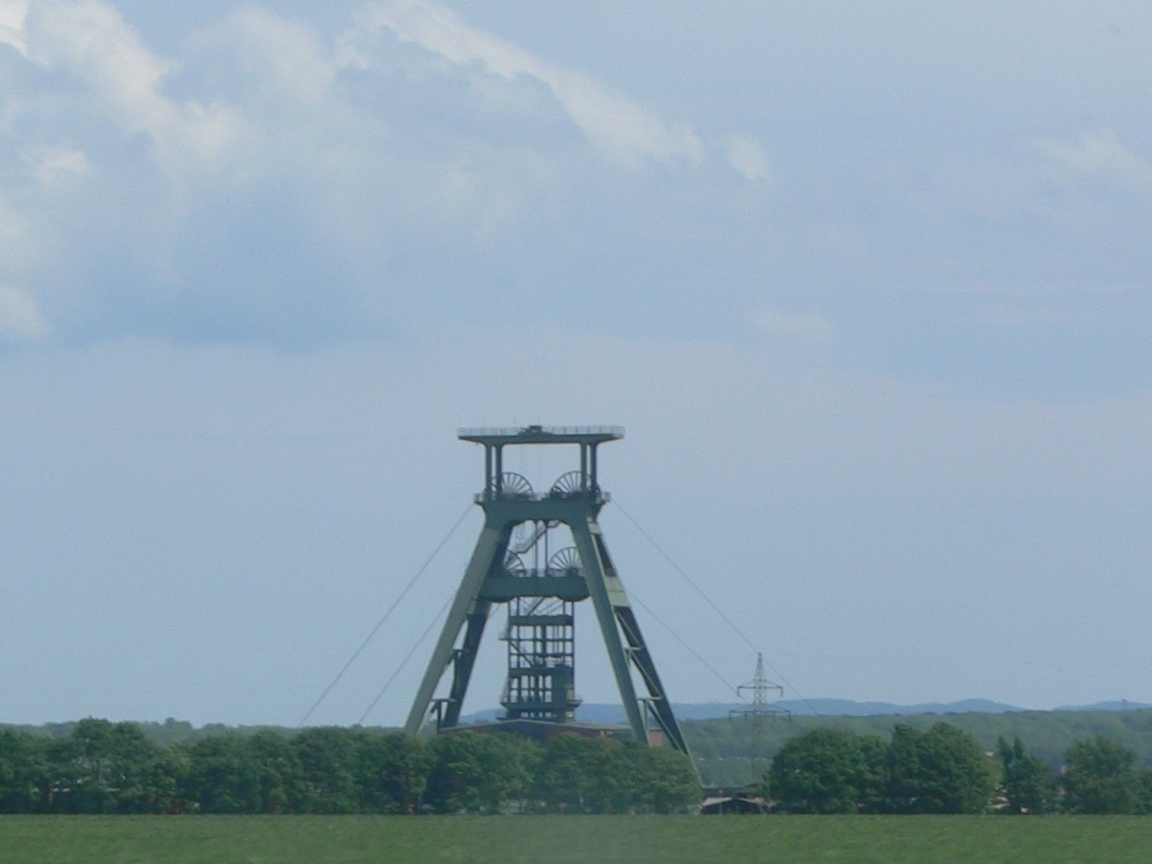
Schacht Konrad I

The Konrad mine (Schacht Konrad) is a former iron ore mine proposed as a deep geological repository for medium- and low level radioactive waste in the city Salzgitter in the Metropolitan region Hannover-Braunschweig-Göttingen-Wolfsburg in southeast Lower Saxony, Germany, located between Hildesheim and Braunschweig. It has two shafts: Konrad I and Konrad II.

== History ==
The iron ore deposits have been mined since the start of the industrialization in the Salzgitter area. The first activities began in 1867. The Konrad mine is the youngest of the former iron ore mines in this region. It has two shafts, of which Schacht Konrad I, is approximately 1,232 meters and Schacht Konrad II is around 999 meters deep. The mining operation on Konrad lasted from 1961 to 1976. During this period, a total of 6.7 million tonnes of iron ore were retrieved.

== Authorization for radioactive waste disposal ==
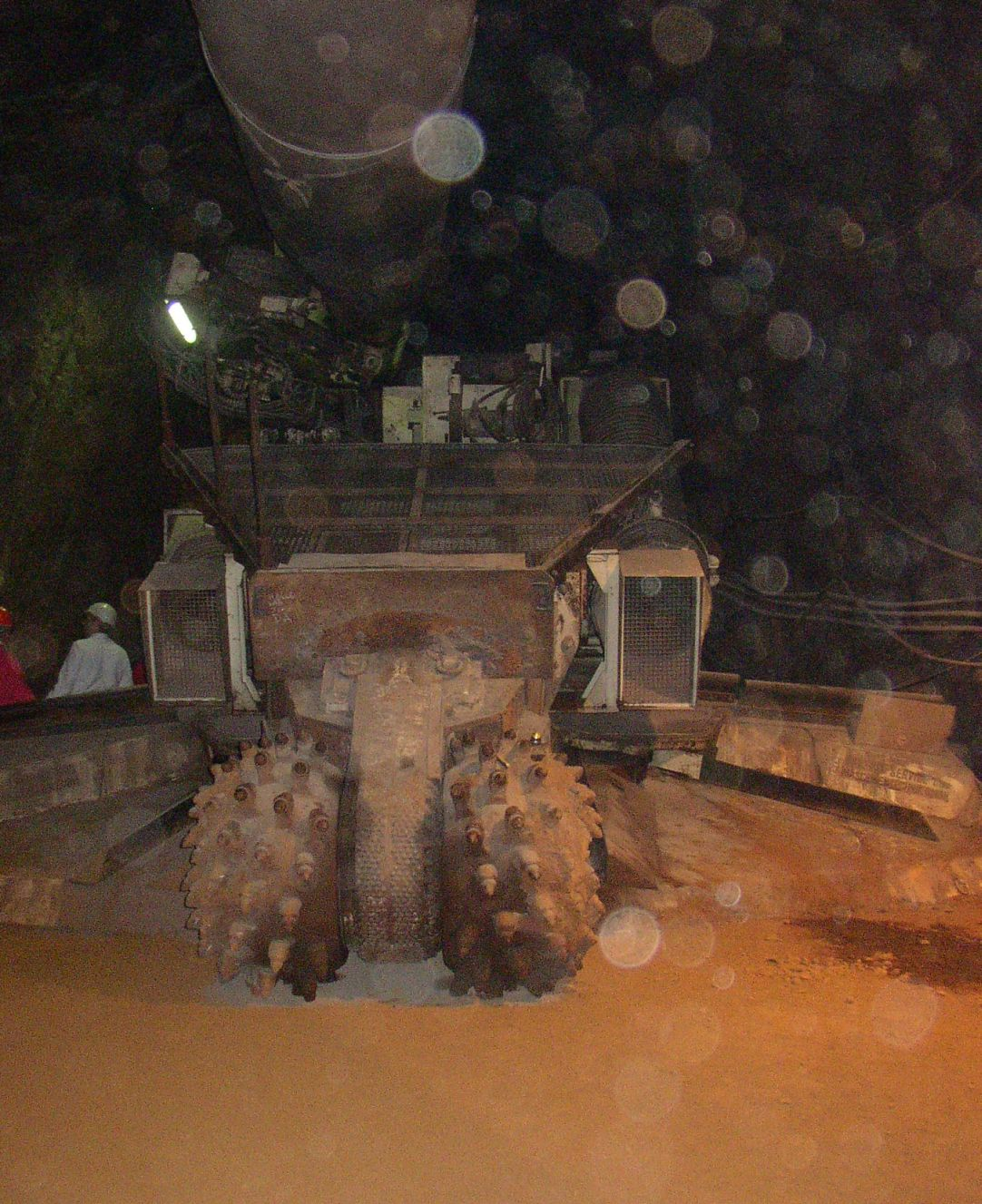
Tunnel boring machine in an emplacement tunnel for the planned final disposal of low- and intermediate level waste.

Konrad mine is an unusually dry iron ore mine. Since this is one of the criteria for a deep final repository for radioactive waste, the studies on the possibility of a disposal site were started in 1975. The Physikalisch-Technische Bundesanstalt (PTB) started the plannings procedure on 31 August 1982. The Bundesamt für Strahlenschutz, the Ministry of Environment of Lower Saxony and the Deutsche Gesellschaft zum Bau und Betrieb von Endlagern für Abfallstoffe discussed the issue between September 1992 and March 1993. On 22 May 2002 the license for the final deep geological storage of medium- and low level radioactive waste was approved.

Several complaints against the license were filled at the Oberverwaltungsgericht Lüneburg. Key action points were the long-term safety, the safety studies were 25 years old and little based on facts, accidents, transport of radioactive waste, radioactive exposure to the population in the area, possible terrorist attacks, the lack of a comparative assessment with other locations and the planning jurisdiction of municipalities. The hearing lasted from February 28 to March 2, 2006. The Oberverwaltungsgericht Lüneburg dismissed the cases as ungrounded in March 2006. Given the fundamental importance of the ruling individual plaintiffs still sought a revision to the Federal Administrative Court of Germany (by non-admission complaint), which however was not accepted in 2007.

The license approves the storage of up to 0.000303 km^{3} (or 303,000 m^{3}) of low- and intermediate level radioactive waste. After the initial phase of final storage to clear the backlog of 88,000 m^{3} waste in other locations the expected traffic is 10 road freight vehicles and one train of 20 freight wagons per week.

By the end of 2007 around 945 million euros has been spent on reconnaissance and planning, for the remaining necessary measures such as the upgrading of the mine and completion of the disposal site the costs are estimated at another 900 million euros.

== Foundation GmbH ==
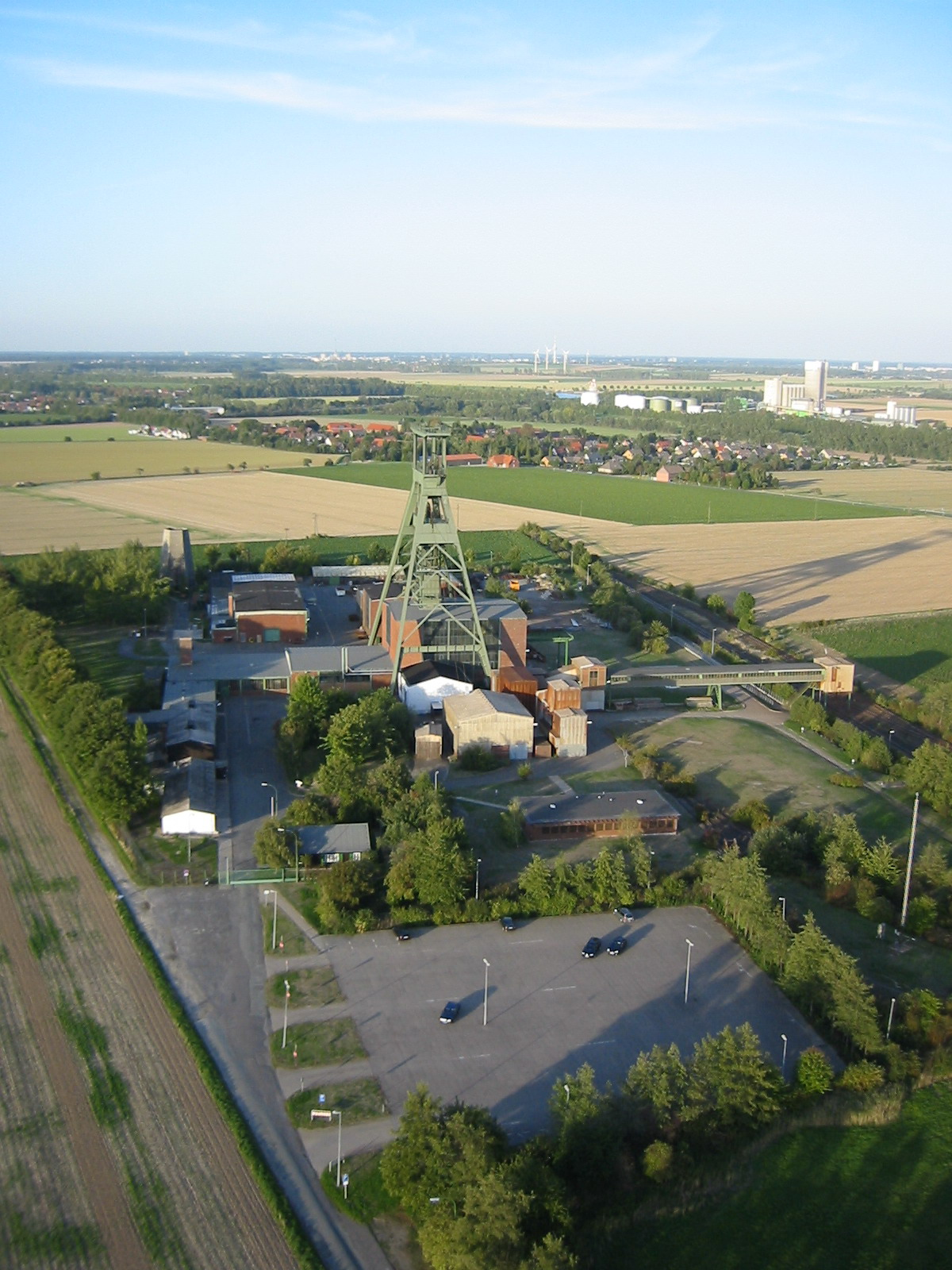
Schacht Konrad I

For the takeover of state-specific responsibilities, which the city and the region Salzgitter bear, a foundation GmbH is proposed by the Federal Ministry for Environment, Nature Conservation and Nuclear Safety. The energy companies initially bring in 30 million euros with further payments over an initial period of 30 years of service. The federal government will contribute from 2009 to 2043 700,000 euros per year. The fund will compensate for the lack of tax revenues since the operation of the shaft Konrad like any other business uses the infrastructure in the area of Salzgitter but is relieved from VAT and local tax measures.

== Conversion ==
The establishment of the technical installations for the disposal and storage chambers started. The conversion has taken a number of years and was due to be complete in 2027, though this date will now not be met. Storage is scheduled to start the early 2030s. Clustered storage chambers form a storage depot. In total, up to nine storage depots are projected on the existing main soles on 800, 850, 1000, 1100, 1200 and 1300 m depth. The storage chambers are created with a diameter of about 40 m^{2} with a bottom width of about 7 meters and a height of about 6 meters. Its length should be 100 to 1000 meters, depending on the geological and mining technical conditions.

After the storage of the radioactive containers, the sectional shafts will be closed with concrete for the permanent storage of the nuclear waste.

== See also ==
- Morsleben radioactive waste repository
- Gorleben salt dome
- Shaft mining
- Schacht Asse II
