= Bundesamt für Strahlenschutz =

Coordinates: 52°09′4.1″N 10°39′51.6″E

Federal Office for Radiation Protection
- Bundesamt für Strahlenschutz – BfS –

Agency overview
- Jurisdiction: Salzgitter
- Headquarters: Willy-Brandt-Straße 5 D-38226 Salzgitter
- Employees: 708 (2008)
- Annual budget: about 305 Mio. Euro (2009)
- Agency executive: Dr. Inge Paulini
- Parent agency: Federal Ministry for Environment, Nature Conservation and Nuclear Safety
- Website: www.bfs.de/EN/home/home_node.html

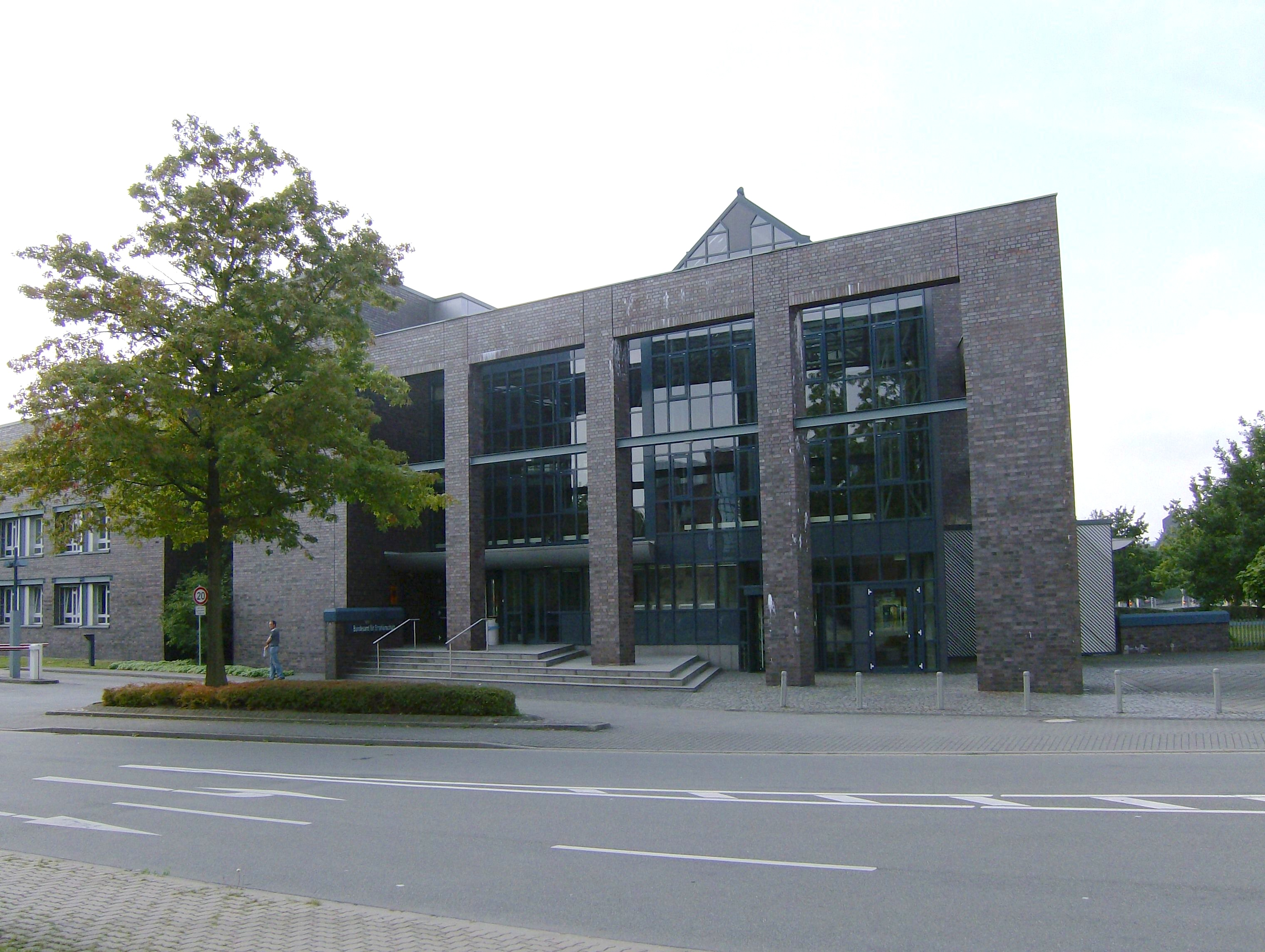
BfS main building in Salzgitter Lebenstedt

The Bundesamt für Strahlenschutz (BfS) is the German Federal Office for Radiation Protection. The BfS was established in November 1989; the headquarters is located in Salzgitter, with branch offices in Berlin, Bonn, Freiburg, Gorleben, Oberschleißheim and Rendsburg. It has 708 employees (including 305 scientific) and an annual budget of around 305 million Euro (2009). Since 2009 the BfS is also responsible for the storage site of radioactive waste, Schacht Asse II.

== History ==
Against the background of the Chernobyl nuclear disaster in April 1986 and the Transnuklear scandal in 1987, the BfS was founded with the aim of re-bundling competencies and responsibilities in the field of radiation protection. The following organizational units were merged into the BfS:

- Department "Securing and Disposal of Radioactive Waste" (SE), Physikalisch-Technische Bundesanstalt, Braunschweig
- Institute for Atmospheric Radioactivity (IAR), Federal Office for Civil Protection, Freiburg
- Institute for Radiation Hygiene (ISH), Federal Health Office, Neuherberg near Munich
- Parts of the Society for Reactor Safety (GRS) mbH, Cologne/Munich

With reunification, parts of the State Office for Nuclear Safety and Radiation Protection of the former GDR were added after a short time.

In 1990, the BfS took over the operational management of the repository for radioactive waste from the former GDR in Morsleben. In the years that followed, it expanded the local dose rate (ODL) measurement network for monitoring environmental radioactivity.

Between 2001 and 2003, the BfS issued the first permits for the construction of decentralized interim storage facilities for spent nuclear fuel at the sites of German nuclear power plants. In 2009, the operation and immediate decommissioning of the Asse mine was transferred to the BfS. After comparing options, it was decided to salvage the waste from the mine.

The new start in the search for a repository for high-level radioactive waste also resulted in a restructuring of the authorities involved in 2016. Tasks in the area of disposal, storage and transport of radioactive waste and nuclear safety, for which the BfS was responsible, were assigned to transferred to the Federal Office for the Safety of Nuclear Waste Management (BASE), on the other hand to the Federal Society for Disposal (BGE). Among other things, BASE has also taken over the task of keeping statistics on reportable events from the BfS. With the reorganization, the competencies of the BfS are concentrated on the state tasks of radiation protection, for example in the area of nuclear emergency protection, medical research, mobile communications, UV protection or the measuring networks for radioactivity in the environment.

== Structure ==
The BfS is supervised by the Federal Ministry for Environment, Nature Conservation and Nuclear Safety (BMU). The BfS has four sub-departments.

- Fachbereich SK – Sicherheit in der Kerntechnik – Department for Safety in Nuclear Engineering
- Fachbereich SE – Sicherheit nuklearer Entsorgung – Department for the Safety of Nuclear Waste Disposal
- Fachbereich SG – Strahlenschutz und Gesundheit – Department for Radiation and Health
- Fachbereich SW – Strahlenschutz und Umwelt – Department for Radiation and the Environment

== Gamma dose rate network ==
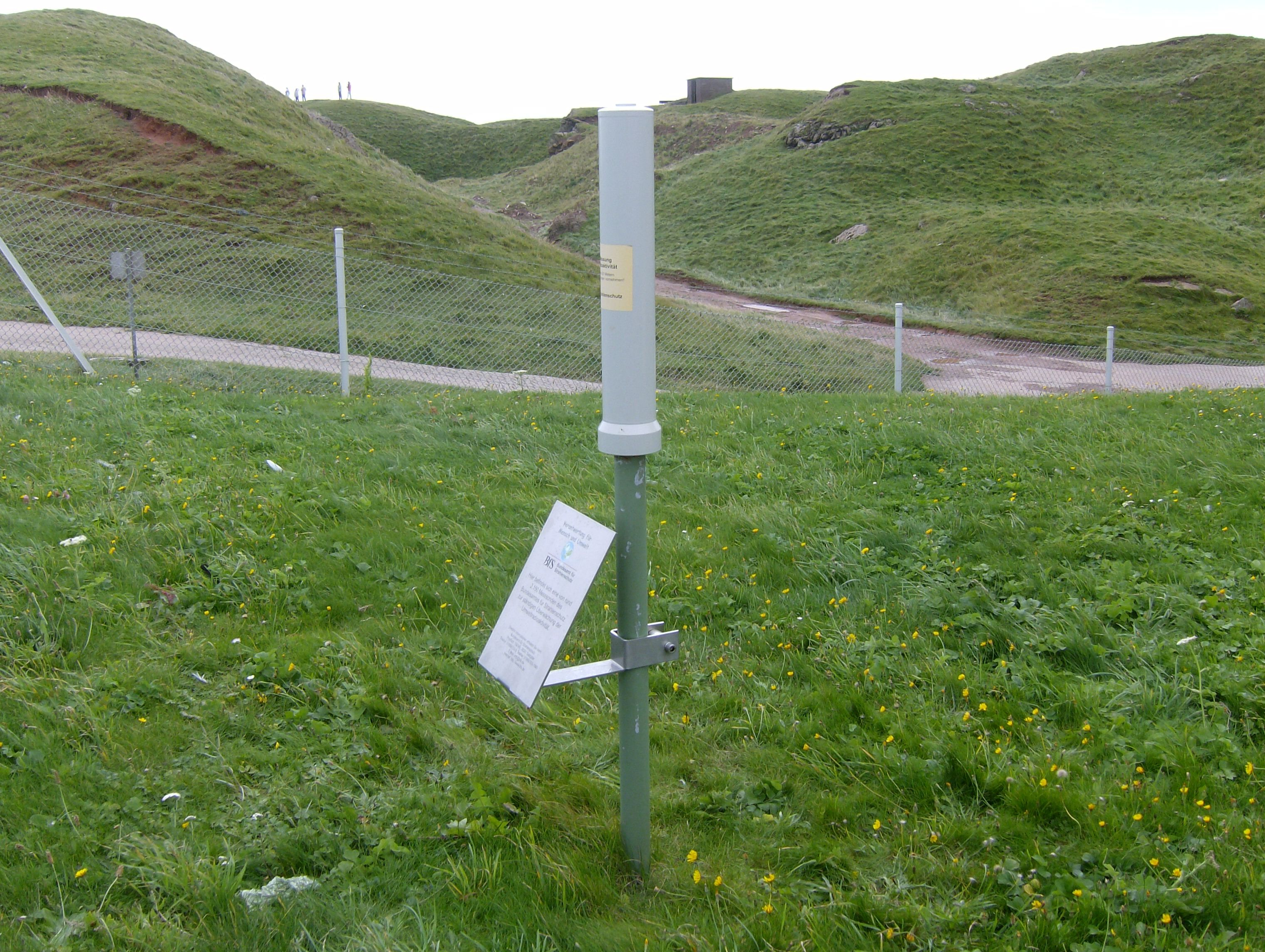
Gamma dose rate probe, part of the German radiation measurement network operated by BfS, department SW

The BfS operates a gamma dose rate measurement network with about 1800 probes, uniformly distributed over Germany. The automatically working systems compare the actual level of radiation with the long term mean and sends an alert to the data centers immediately, if the radiation exceeds the threshold value. This network is a part of the German early warning system, in case of a nuclear accident. Hardware of data logger and probes as well as software are developed in-house by the BfS. On the mountain Schauinsland the BfS operates an international measurement station for gamma dose rate probe calibration and long term tests.

Another important task of the BfS is research in the areas of radiation protection and radiation protection precautions. The BfS provides technical and scientific support to the Federal Ministry for the Environment, Nature Conservation and Nuclear Safety (BMU) in the areas mentioned.

== See also ==
- Comprehensive Nuclear-Test-Ban Treaty
- Schacht Asse II
- Schacht Konrad
- Repository for radioactive waste Morsleben
- Nuclear safety
