= Asse II mine =

Salt mine in Germany

Coordinates: 52°08′38″N 10°38′32″E

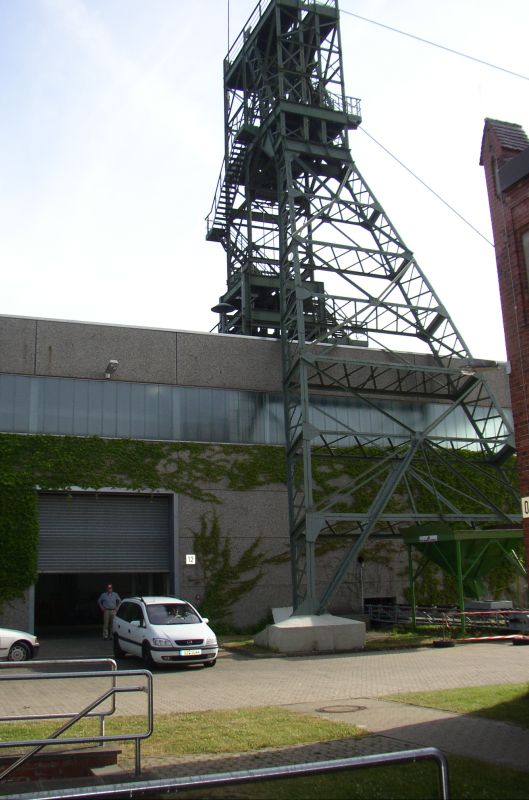
Asse II headframe

The Asse II mine (Schacht Asse II) is a former salt mine used as a deep geological repository for radioactive waste in the Asse Mountains of Wolfenbüttel, Lower Saxony, Germany.

== History ==
The Asse II mine was developed between 1906 and 1908 to a depth of 765 metres (2,510 ft). Initially extracting potash, the mine also produced rock salt from 1916 to 1964. Potash production ceased in 1925.

Between 1965 and 1995, the state-owned Helmholtz Zentrum München used the mine on behalf of the Federal Ministry of Research to test the handling and storage of radioactive waste in a repository. Between 1967 and 1978 low-level and intermediate-level radioactive waste were emplaced in 13 chambers in the Asse II mine. Two chambers are located in the middle part and ten in the southern flank of the mine at depths from 725 to 750 metres (2,379 to 2,461 ft) below surface. Between 1972 and 1977, exclusively medium-level radioactive waste was emplaced in a chamber on the 511 metres (1,677 ft) level. Research was stopped in 1995; between 1995 and 2004 cavities were filled with salt. After media reports in 2008 about brine contaminated with radioactive caesium-137, plutonium and strontium, politicians accused the operator, Helmholtz Zentrum München – German Research Center for Environmental Health, of not having informed the inspecting authorities. On 8 September 2008, the responsible ministers of Lower Saxony and the German government replaced the operator with Bundesamt für Strahlenschutz (BFS) - the Federal Office for Radiation Protection.

In April 2017, operator responsibility for Asse II was transferred from BFS to the Supervisory Board of the Bundes-Gesellschaft für Endlagerung mbH (BGE), under the Federal Ministry for the Environment, Nature Conservation and Nuclear Safety.

== Inventory ==
Asse II contains intermediate radioactive waste (LILW-LL, Long lived) and low level waste (LILW-SL, Short lived), defined as waste without significant heat generation. After public speculation about the presence of radioactive high level waste in the mine the old documentation was once again reviewed in August 2008:

1. 125,787 drums of low level radioactive waste stored from 1967 to 1978 in various chambers at the 750-metre (2,460 ft) level. The containers are mostly drums with volumes from 100 to 400 litres (26 to 106 US gal) or concrete vessels. The declared total activity at the time of storage was 1.8·10^{15} Bq. Around 50% of the containers came from the former Forschungszentrum Karlsruhe nuclear reprocessing plant, 20% from nuclear power plants and 10% from the former Jülich Research Centre. The containers typically included mixed and laboratory waste, rubble, scrap, filter residues and combustion residues. Liquids such as evaporator concentrates, sludges, oils, resins and solvents had to be bound as solids. According to some former employees barrels of liquid waste were accepted in the early days of storage.
2. 1,293 containers with medium-level radioactive waste stored from 1972 to 1977 in Chamber 8a at the 511-metre (1,677 ft) level. Only 200-litre (53 US gal) roll drums were permitted with waste fixed in concrete or bitumen. The declared total activity at the time of storage was 2.8·10^{15} Bq. About 97% of the packages (over 90% of the total activity inventory of Asse II) originated from the Karlsruhe reprocessing plant. Some of the Karlsruhe drums contained waste from the reprocessing plant itself, and thus fissile material. Storage limits per drum were 200 grams (7.1 oz) U-235, 15 grams (0.53 oz) U-233 and 15 grams (0.53 oz) Pu-239. These limits were not exceeded. Maximum values per drum were 24 grams (0.85 oz) U-235, 5.7 grams (0.20 oz) Pu-239 and less than 1 gram (0.035 oz) U-233 on the 511-metre (1,677 ft) level.

However the type of the waste was determined by the measurable amount of radiation outside of the container, not by the actual contents of the vessel. Because of this it must be assumed that the containers with concrete shielding also contained medium level waste, raising their number from 1293 to 16.100. Some of these concrete vessels emitted radiation above the permitted level and had to be stored in special metal shielding.

Other notable waste that is stored in the mine are 497 kilogram arsenic, mercury, tons of lead and animal carcasses from radiation experiments. Even some human remains and waste from the Nazi era are rumored to be part of the inventory.

=== Storage methods ===
In the first years of operation the barrels were stored in orderly rows and space was left so it was theoretically possible to inspect them. In the later years, when most of the waste was brought in, the drums were rolled off a salt embankment into the chambers and the layers covered by salt. This was done to reduce radiation exposure of the workers and to save time, however it meant that many containers would be damaged already at the time they were stored.

The waste containers were only intended to be safe during transportation to the facility. They do not have long time stability and rust after some years, especially in a salty environment. The salt surrounding them was intended to be the only containment for the waste. There never was an intention for the waste to be recoverable.

== Instability of the mine ==
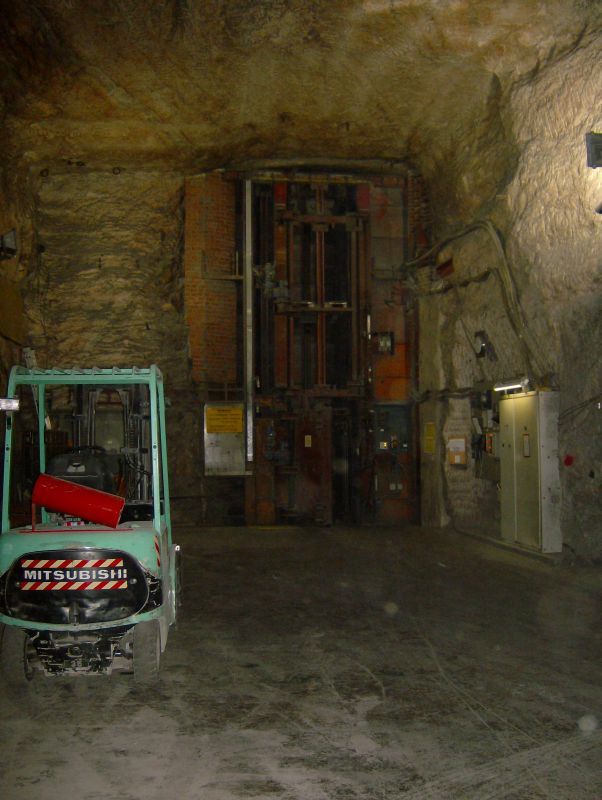
Schacht Asse II 490 m level

Typically salt mining is structurally unsupported. Stresses produced in the remaining salt structure during construction of the mine voids are accommodated in the overlying rock. Plasticity effects are taken into account as they occur naturally in salt domes. Significant mechanical stress is built up between the surrounding diapir and the mine construction. The overlying rock mass in Asse II moves 15 centimetres (5.9 in) per year, undermining the strength of the mine construction.

Because of the large number of tunnels and chambers, and the decades of use, deformation in Asse II has reached a state where the pressurised surrounding salt is losing its stability: "The supporting construction is softening by creep deformation, plasticity effects and local fractures from ground pressure."

In 1979 a report on the stability of the mine was released by a working group under HH Juergens, which describes an imminent scenario of uncontrolled plastic flow from the surrounding rock on the southern flank resulting in the subsequent loss of the load carrying capacity. The manager of Asse II in 1979 and his advisers categorised this report as "unscientific" and declared that there were no stability problems.

In 2007 the Institut für Gebirgsmechanik (IfG) in Leipzig, which had been monitoring Asse II since 1996, predicted that an increase in the rate of loss of load carrying capacity would result in an increased displacement of the surrounding rock. The shifts would lead to an uncontrollable increase in water inflow and make continued dry operation impossible.

== Recovery and closure ==
First plans for a permanent closure were developed between 1992 and 2007. Recovery of waste was not considered feasible. During this time many cavities of the mine were filled with salt as an intent to stabilize it. To fill all cavities it was planned to fill the mine with a magnesium chloride solution. However the long-term safety of this method could not be proven. The radioactive waste would have been dissolved by the solution and would have had the potential to contaminate the groundwater. The magnesium chloride solution would also have reacted with the cement which could have created explosions and blowouts of radioactive waste to the biosphere.

During this time most of the caverns with nuclear waste were sealed behind thick walls; because of this the condition of the waste inside is unknown. The only theoretically accessible chamber is one with medium level waste.

=== Current progress ===
After the controversies about the facility became public and the operator was changed to the Federal Office for Radiation Protection, a new plan was developed in 2010. It became obvious that the recovery of the waste is necessary for long-term safety. The waste is planned to be collected by remotely controlled robots, sealed in safe containers, and stored temporarily above ground. Preparations include creating a new shaft that will be big enough and building the above ground storage facility. The estimated costs for the closure of the mine are estimated to be at least 3.7 billion Euro. The recovery of the waste and closure of the mine will be paid with tax money, not by the operators of the German nuclear plants, even though most of the waste was created by them. The beginning of the recovery is planned to start in 2033 and is estimated to last for decades.

Chamber 7 is designated to be the first one for recovery. It contains low and medium level waste covered by salt. Test drillings in 2017 offered the first pictures from inside the chamber since decades, they show damaged and rusted containers.

== Water inflow ==
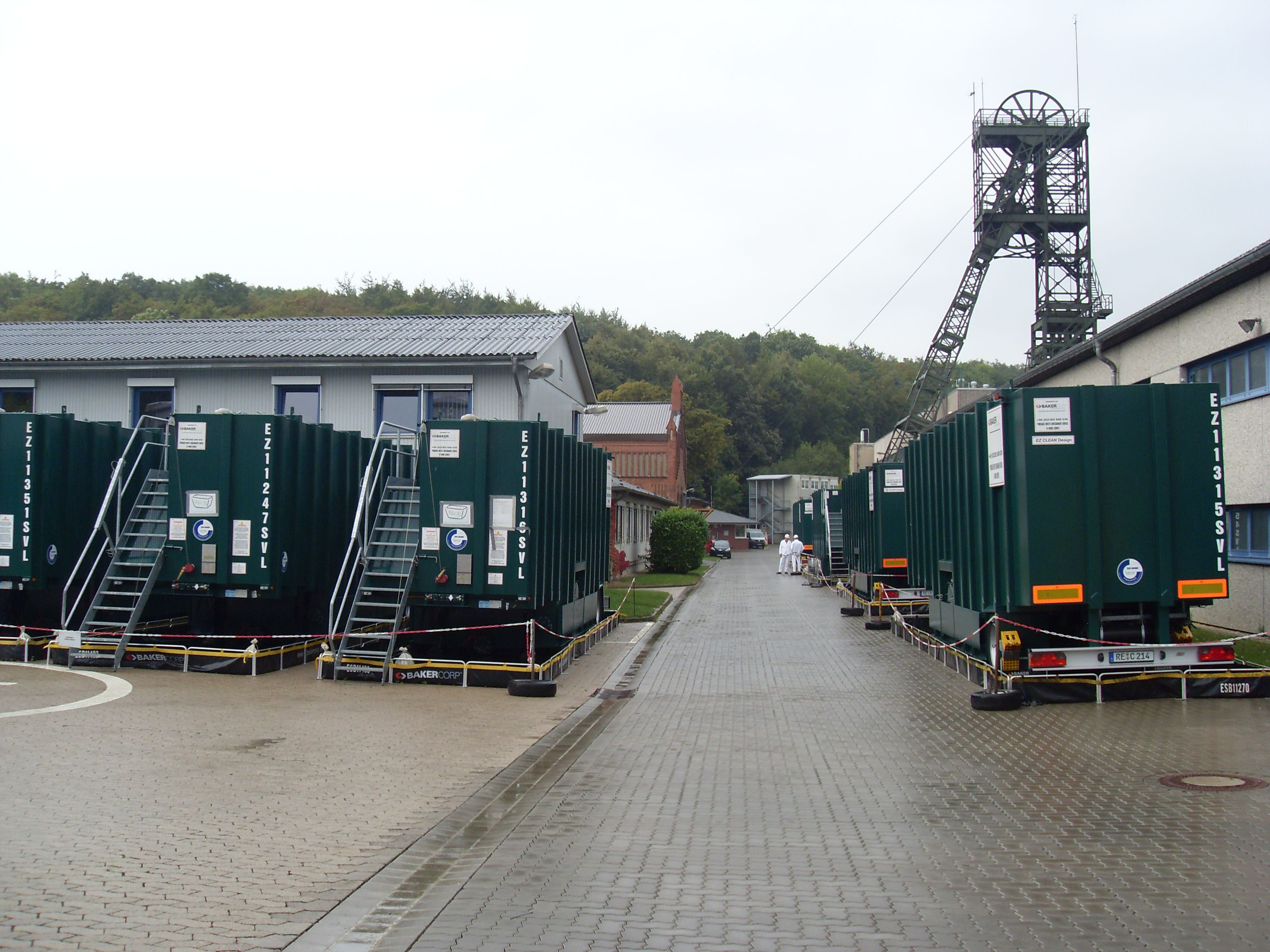
Brine tankers at the mine (August 2009)

A significant inflow of water and a subtle loss of mechanical stability may jeopardise the underground mine integrity – the site is in danger of collapsing and becoming flooded.

For the period 1906 to 1988, when Asse II was an operational salt mine, there were 29 documented water breaches. They were sometimes successfully sealed off, partly dry or sometimes with negligible inflows (less than 0.5 cubic metres (130 US gal) per day).

Between 1988 and 2008 32 new entry points were recorded. In 1996, the BFS notified the Bundesumweltministerium that there was a risk of severe radioactive contamination if the mine ran full of water and that further investigation was urgently required.

Most of the brine influx is concluded as coming from the diapir in the southern part of the mine. The brine is captured before it comes in contact with the storage drums, at the 658, 725 and 750 metres (2,159, 2,379 and 2,461 ft) levels and, since 2005, at the 950 metres (3,120 ft) level. The 2008 influx was 11.8 m^{3} (3,100 US gal) per day. The liquid is tested for the radionuclide caesium-137. All measured values have been below the detection limit. The liquid is also tested for tritium. The weighted mean concentration is about 100 Bq/litre, which is the value that must be present in accordance with the European drinking water standard (and slightly more than radon levels in Bad Gastein radon spa in Austria). The brine is pumped into a tanker and transported to the abandoned K+S AG mines (Bad Salzdetfurth, Adolfsglück and Mariaglück) The brine in Mariaglück is also tested for caesium-137 and tritium.

== See also ==
- Gorleben salt dome
- Morsleben radioactive waste repository
- Nuclear decommissioning
- Schacht Konrad
- Schikorr reaction
- Waste Isolation Pilot Plant
