= Herbert Rollwage =

German fighter ace and Knight's Cross recipient

- Born: 24 September 1916; Gielde, German Empire
- Died: 4 January 1980 (aged 63); Gielde, West Germany
- Military career
- Allegiance: Nazi Germany (to 1945); West Germany
- Branch: Luftwaffe; German Air Force
- Service years: 1936–1945
- Rank: Oberleutnant (Wehrmacht); Hauptmann (Bundeswehr)
- Unit: JG 53
- Conflicts: World War II: Operation Barbarossa; Battle of Malta; Italian Campaign; Defense of the Reich
- Awards: Knight's Cross of the Iron Cross with Oak Leaves

Herbert Rollwage (24 September 1916 – 4 January 1980) was a German Luftwaffe military aviator and fighter ace during World War II. Depending on source, he is credited between 71 and 102 aerial victories achieved in 664 combat missions. This figure includes 11 aerial victories on the Eastern Front, and at least 61 victories over the Western Allies, including up to 44 four-engine heavy bombers.

== Career ==
Rollwage was born on 24 September 1916 in Gielde, at the time in the Province of Hanover within the German Empire, present-day part of the Schladen-Werla municipality. He was the son of a shunter who joined the military service of the Luftwaffe as an Unteroffizier (non-commissioned officer) candidate in 1936. Following flight training, (Note: Flight training in the Luftwaffe progressed through the levels A1, A2 and B1, B2, referred to as A/B flight training. A training included theoretical and practical training in aerobatics, navigation, long-distance flights and dead-stick landings. The B courses included high-altitude flights, instrument flights, night landings and training to handle the aircraft in difficult situations.) Rollwage was posted to 4. Staffel (4th squadron) of Jagdgeschwader 53 (JG 53—53rd Fighter Wing) in 1941 holding the rank of Feldwebel (platoon sergeant).

=== Operation Barbarossa ===
On 8 June 1941, the bulk of JG 53's air elements moved via Jever, in northern Germany, to Mannheim-Sandhofen. There the aircraft were given a maintenance overhaul prior to moving east. The II. Gruppe was transferred to Neusiedel in East Prussia, present-day Malomožaiskojė in Kaliningrad Oblast in Russia, between 12 and 14 June. On 22 June, the Geschwader crossed into Soviet airspace in support of Operation Barbarossa, the invasion of the Soviet Union which opened the Eastern Front. That day, Rollwage claimed his first aerial victory when he shot down a Soviet Tupolev SB-2 bomber. On 5 July 1941, he was awarded the Iron Cross 2nd Class (Eisernes Kreuz zweiter Klasse) followed by the Iron Cross 1st Class (Eisernes Kreuz erster Klasse) on 16 September.

On 5 October, Rollwage claimed his last aerial victory on the Eastern Front, his eleventh in total, when he shot down a Polikarpov I-16 fighter. That day, his unit flew its final missions in the area of Shlisselburg. The Gruppe then relocated to the Western Front where it arrived at Leeuwarden Air Base in the Netherlands on 12 October. On 2 December 1941, II. Gruppe moved to the Mediterranean theater and where then based at Comiso airfield during the siege of Malta.

=== Mediterranean theater ===
Rollwage was credited with his first aerial victory in the Mediterranean theater on 4 January 1942, claiming Royal Air Force (RAF) Hawker Hurricane fighter shot down. On 14 April, he claimed his 13th and 14th aerial victories when he shot down two Bristol Beaufort bombers south of Qrendi. Two Supermarine Spitfire fighters claimed on 10 May near Valletta took his total to 18 aerial victories. Three days later, he claimed another Spitfire shot down near Luqa. On 14 July, Rollwage participated in mission which escorted 15 Junkers Ju 88 bombers from Kampfgeschwader 54 (KG 54—54th Bomber Wing) to the RAF Luqa airfield. On this mission, he claimed a Spitfire fighter shot down.

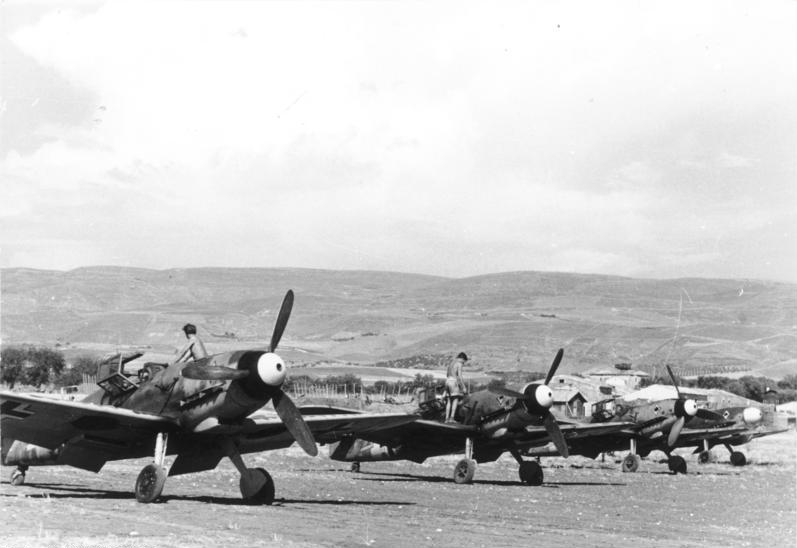
Messerschmitt Bf 109G's of JG 53 in southern Italy

On 8 August 1942, Rollwage flew his 300th combat mission and claimed a Spitfire fighter shot down. His opponent may have been the Canadian fighter pilot George Beurling who managed to land his damaged aircraft. For his achievements to date, Rollwage was awarded the Honor Goblet of the Luftwaffe (Ehrenpokal der Luftwaffe) on 10 August followed by the German Cross in Gold (Deutsches Kreuz in Gold) two days later. Following the Allied invasion of French North Africa in Operation Torch, II. Gruppe relocated to Tunis on 9 November. On 30 December, a number of United States Army Air Forces (USAAF) Lockheed P-38 Lightning fighters escorted twelve Douglas A-20 Havoc bombers on their bombing mission to Gabès. 5. Staffel intercepted the formation and Rollwage claimed one of the P-38 fighters shot down, his 35th aerial victory. His opponent may have been Virgil Smith of the 14th Fighter Group, who was killed in the crash landing.

On 8 July 1943, the USAAF attacked Ramacca with 24 Boeing B-17 Flying Fortress bombers. Elements of II. Gruppe intercepted the bombers. During this aerial battle, Rollwage claimed a B-17 bomber shot down approximately 10 kilometers (6.2 miles) southwest of Capo Scaramia. The next day, the USAAF attacked the Luftwaffe airfield at Trapani with a formation of Martin B-26 Marauder bombers escorted by Curtiss P-40 Warhawk fighters. The formation was intercepted at 10:53. In this encounter, Luftwaffe pilots claimed seven aerial victories including a P-40 shot down by Rollwage 7 kilometers (4.3 miles) northwest of Cape San Vito. On 10 July during the Allied invasion of Sicily, Rollwage claimed two aerial victories, a P-38 fighter and a Ryan YO-51 Dragonfly observation aircraft. The YO-51 was likely misidentified and could have been a Vought OS2U Kingfisher observation floatplane launched form USS Birmingham and piloted by Lieutenant McGuiness. Following this encounter, he was shot down and wounded in his Messerschmitt Bf 109 G-6 (Werknummer 18242—factory number) near San Pietro.

=== Defense of the Reich ===
In mid-October 1943, II. Gruppe of JG 53 was withdrawn Italy and ordered to relocate to Wien-Seyring near Vienna for combat in defense of the Reich. In Wien-Seyring, the Gruppe received a full complement of factory new Bf 109 G-6 aircraft. Here, Rollwage returned to his unit in November after a period of convalescence following his injuries sustained on 10 July. On 7 January 1944, the USAAF targeted Vienna. The heavy bombers were escorted by P-38 fighters. II. Gruppe was scrambled at 10:41 and engaged the escorting P-38 fighters. In this 40 minute aerial battle, Luftwaffe pilots claimed 15 P-38s shot down, including two by Rollwage, taking his total to 49 aerial victories claimed. On 25 February during Operation Argument, also known as Big Week, the USAAF Fifteenth Air Force attacked the ball bearing factories at Steyr. Defending against this attack, Rollwage shot down a B-17 bomber near Gmunden.

On 5 April, Rollwage was awarded the Knight's Cross of the Iron Cross (Ritterkreuz des Eisernen Kreuzes) for 53 aerial victories. He received the award from Generalleutnant Joseph Schmid, commanding 1. Jagdkorps. Rollwage was promoted to Leutnant (second lieutenant) on 1 May 1944. On 27 May, the USAAF 3rd Bombardment Division sent 102 B-17 bombers to Strasbourg and further 98 B-17 bombers to the marshalling yard at Karlsruhe. Defending against attack, Rollwage claimed a B-17 bomber and an escorting North American P-51 Mustang fighter shot down. On 15 August, Rollwage was appointed Staffelkapitän (squadron leader) of 5. Staffel of JG 53. He succeeded Oberleutnant Karl Paashaus who was transferred.

In December 1944, Rollwage was transferred to II. Gruppe of Jagdgeschwader 106 (JG 106—106th Fighter Wing), a fighter pilot training unit, where he served as an instructor. On 21 January 1945, Rollwagen, who was en route to the Führerbunker in Berlin to be awarded the Knight's Cross of the Iron Cross with Oak Leaves (Ritterkreuz des Eisernen Kreuzes mit Eichenlaub) by Adolf Hitler, visited II. Gruppe of JG 53 then based at Rutesheim. The Gruppenkommandeur (group commander), Major Julius Meimberg, advised Rollwage to be at his best behavior when meeting with Hitler. Apparently, Rollwage had a problem with military discipline. The Oak Leaves were awarded to him on 24 January, the 713th member of the German armed forces to be so honored. Rollwage claimed his last documented aerial victory on 5 April. At the time both II. Gruppe of JG 106 and II. Gruppe of JG 53 were both based at Rißtissen, located approximately 10 kilometers (6.2 miles) southwest of Ulm. That day, Rollwage shot down a Republic P-47 Thunderbolt fighter.

== Later life ==
Following World War II, Rollwage served in the newly established German Air Force of West Germany with the rank of Hauptmann (captain) until his retirement in 1968. He died on 4 January 1980 in his hometown Gielde.

== Summary of career ==
=== Aerial victory claims ===
According to Spick, Rollwage was credited with 102 aerial victories claimed in over 500 combat missions. Toliver and Constable also list him with 102 aerial victories, 11 on the Eastern Front, 20 in the Mediterranean theater and 71 on the Western Front, including 44 heavy bombers. Obermaier states that exact number of aerial victories remains unknown, likely to be in the range of 80 to 85, claimed in 664 combat missions. Scutts lists him with 71 aerial victories, including 12 on the Eastern Front. Mathews and Foreman, authors of Luftwaffe Aces — Biographies and Victory Claims, researched the German Federal Archives and found documentation for 66 aerial victory claims, plus six further unconfirmed claims. This number includes ten claims on the Eastern Front and 56 over the Western Allies, including ten four-engined bombers. Stockert speculates that the figure of 102 aerial victories stated by some authors is likely liked to the confusion between aerial victories claimed and the Luftwaffe point system associated to shooting down a heavy bomber. In 1943, the Luftwaffe had introduced a point system which accounted for the difficulties in shooting down a heavy bomber. Although a single heavy bomber shot down or damaged still counted as one aerial victory, the pilot was however credited with three points. These accumulated points earned a fighter pilot awards, medals and promotions.

Victory claims were logged to a map-reference (PQ = Planquadrat), for example "PQ 15 Ost S/JA". The Luftwaffe grid map (Jägermeldenetz) covered all of Europe, western Russia and North Africa and was composed of rectangles measuring 15 minutes of latitude by 30 minutes of longitude, an area of about 360 square miles (930 km^{2}). These sectors were then subdivided into 36 smaller units to give a location area 3 km × 4 km (1.9 mi × 2.5 mi) in size.

Chronicle of aerial victories
This and the – (dash) indicates unconfirmed aerial victory claims for which Rollwage did not receive credit. This along with the * (asterisk) indicates an Herausschuss (separation shot)—a severely damaged heavy bomber forced to separate from his combat box which was counted as an aerial victory. This and the ? (question mark) indicates information discrepancies listed by Prien, Stemmer, Rodeike, Bock, Mathews, and Foreman.
Claim	Date	Time	Type	Location	Claim	Date	Time	Type	Location
– 4. Staffel of Jagdgeschwader 53 – Operation Barbarossa — 22 June – 4 October 1941
1	22 June 1941	05:57	SB-2	north of Raseiniai	6	27 August 1941	13:49	unspecified flying boat	northwest of Szaltzo
2	11 July 1941	05:45	SB-3	east of Slavkovichi	7	27 August 1941	17:14	unspecified passenger aircraft? (Note: According to Mathews and Foreman claimed as an unspecified flying boat.)	north of Ivanskoye
—	16 July 1941	—	SB-2		8? (Note: According to Mathews and Foreman this claim is unconfirmed.)	30 August 1941	05:09	I-16	southwest of Solugubovka
3	21 July 1941	21:03	SB-3	northeast of Dno	9	16 September 1941	10:31	Li-2	northeast of Babino
4	25 August 1941	16:40	I-18 (MiG-1)	south of Njetschanje	10	30 September 1941	13:08	I-180 (Yak-7)	east of Taksowo
5	27 August 1941	13:48	unspecified flying boat	northwest of Szaltzo	11	5 October 1941	06:32	I-16	northwest of Shlisselburg
– 5. Staffel of Jagdgeschwader 53 – Mediterranean Theater — 25 November 1941 – 31 December 1942
12	4 January 1942	10:31	Hurricane	northwest of Maltas Point	24	8 July 1942	11:32	Spitfire	1 km (0.62 mi) south of Birżebbuġa
13	14 April 1942	17:05	Beaufort	3 km (1.9 mi) south of Qrendi	25	9 July 1942	19:25	Spitfire	7 km (4.3 mi) southwest of Dingli
14	14 April 1942	17:07	Beaufort	2 km (1.2 mi) south of Qrendi	26	14 July 1942	10:25	Spitfire	12 km (7.5 mi) west of Żonqor Point
15	24 April 1942	07:43	Spitfire	west of Ta' Vnezja	27	28 July 1942	08:54	Spitfire	2 km (1.2 mi) northwest of Żonqor Point
16	9 May 1942	11:05	Spitfire	1 km (0.62 mi) southeast of Luqa	28	29 July 1942	10:11	Spitfire	20 km (12 mi) east of Malta
17	10 May 1942	11:05	Spitfire	3 km (1.9 mi) south of La Valletta	29	8 August 1942	10:02	Spitfire	5 km (3.1 mi) north of La Valletta
18	10 May 1942	19:04	Spitfire	2 km (1.2 mi) south of La Valetta	30	22 October 1942	16:28	Spitfire	1 km (0.62 mi) east of Malta
19	13 May 1942	13:02	Spitfire	1 km (0.62 mi) northwest of Luqa	31	26 October 1942	12:14	Spitfire	15 km (9.3 mi) northeast of La Valletta
20	1 July 1942	14:04	Spitfire	St. Paul's Bay	32	12 December 1942	15:11	P-38	15 km (9.3 mi) northeast of Limaguess
21	6 July 1942	07:37	Spitfire	southeast of Gozo	33	15 December 1942	08:41	P-38	20 km (12 mi) southeast of Skhira
22	6 July 1942	19:41	Spitfire	3 km (1.9 mi) northeast of La Valletta	34	17 December 1942	09:53	P-38	10 km (6.2 mi) southeast of Gafsa
23	7 July 1942	06:47	Spitfire	4 km (2.5 mi) northeast of Żonqor Point	35	30 December 1942	11:16	P-38	30 km (19 mi) northwest of Gabès
– 5. Staffel of Jagdgeschwader 53 – Mediterranean Theater — 1 January – 10 July 1943
36	23 February 1943	13:05	Beaufort	60 km (37 mi) west of Trapani	42	4 July 1943	11:14	Spitfire	15 km (9.3 mi) east of Catania
37	24 February 1943	12:10	Spitfire	10 km (6.2 mi) west of El Aroussa	43	4 July 1943	14:18	B-26	60 km (37 mi) south of Gela
38	22 May 1943	18:35	Spitfire	20 km (12 mi) south of Gela	44	8 July 1943	12:28	B-17	10 km (6.2 mi) southwest of Ragusa
39	9 June 1943	12:58	B-24	7 km (4.3 mi) northwest of La Valletta	45	9 July 1943	11:02	P-40	7 km (4.3 mi) northwest of Cape San Vito
40	13 June 1943	12:05	Spitfire	north of Mineo	46	10 July 1943	10:37	P-38	1 km (0.62 mi) southwest of Gela
41	20 June 1943	10:47	Spitfire	25 km (16 mi) south of Cap Passero	47	10 July 1943	10:39	YO-51	2 km (1.2 mi) south of Gela
– 5. Staffel of Jagdgeschwader 53 – Defense of the Reich — 1 January – 6 June 1944
48	7 January 1944	12:29	P-38	35 km (22 mi) east-southeast of Graz	56	11 April 1944	11:56	B-17*	PQ 15 Ost S/JA, Goslar
49	7 January 1944	12:32	P-38	30 km (19 mi) southwest of Graz	57	13 April 1944	13:58	B-17	southeast of Aschaffenburg
50?	22 February 1944	13:20	B-24*	Altötting	58	19 April 1944	10:35	B-17	PQ 05 Ost S/LU-5/6 south of Münden, east of Kassel
51?	24 February 1944	13:05	B-17	5 km (3.1 mi) north of Gmunden	59	12 May 1944	15:29	B-17	10 km (6.2 mi) southeast of Koblenz
52	23 March 1944	10:31	B-17*	PQ 15 Ost S/HA-3, southwest of Braunschweig	60	27 May 1944	12:21	P-51	PQ 04 Ost S/CO/CN, south of Lunéville; 270° from Rambervillers
53?	2 April 1944	11:28	B-17	5 km (3.1 mi) north of Zeltweg	61	27 May 1944	12:30	B-17	PQ 04 Ost S/BQ-9, Offenburg
54?	8 April 1944	13:55	B-24	20 km (12 mi) north-northwest of Fallersleben	62	29 May 1944	12:05	B-17	PQ 15 Ost S/JE/JF; Dessau
55	11 April 1944	11:08	B-17	PQ 15 Ost S/GC, Haldensleben; Halberstadt-Quedlinburg					
– 5. Staffel of Jagdgeschwader 53 – Invasion Front in France — 6 June – 31 December 1944
63	8 June 1944	10:43	B-26	15 km (9.3 mi) northeast of Cherbourg off Barfleur	67	28 September 1944	17:28? (Note: According to Mathews and Foreman claimed at 17:38.)	P-47	40 km (25 mi) west of Haguenau north of Sarrebourg
64	17 June 1944	16:15	P-47	4 km (2.5 mi) northeast of Carentan	68	28 September 1944	17:38	P-47	PQ 04 Ost N/AP-7, 10 km (6.2 mi) southeast of Nancy; St Nichlas southwest of Nancy
65	22 August 1944	19:33	P-38	20 km (12 mi) northwest of Saint-Quentin; 5 km (3.1 mi) south of Péronne	69	20 October 1944	10:48	P-47	PQ 04 Ost N/CP-2, Schirmeck southwest of Strasbourg
66	23 August 1944	09:31	P-47	20 km (12 mi) southwest of Mantes-la-Jolie	70	25 November 1944	12:45	Piper L-4	PQ 04 Ost N/AQ-7, north of Mommenheim; Haguenau
– II. Gruppe of Jagdgeschwader 53 – Defense of the Reich — March – May 1945
71	5 April 1945	06:30	P-47						

=== Awards ===
- Iron Cross (1939)
  - 2nd Class (5 July 1941)
  - 1st Class (16 September 1941)
- Honor Goblet of the Luftwaffe on 10 August 1942 as Oberfeldwebel and pilot
- German Cross in Gold on 12 December 1942 as Oberfeldwebel in the 5./Jagdgeschwader 53
- Knight's Cross of the Iron Cross with Oak Leaves
  - Knight's Cross on 6 April 1944 as Oberfeldwebel and pilot in the 3./Jagdgeschwader 53 (Note: According to Scherzer on 5 April 1944 as pilot in the 5./Jagdgeschwader 53.)
  - 713th Oak Leaves on 24 January 1945 as Leutnant and Staffelkapitän of the 5./Jagdgeschwader 53
