= Schladen (Samtgemeinde) =

Coordinates: 52°01′00″N 10°37′00″E

Schladen is a former Samtgemeinde ("collective municipality") in the district of Wolfenbüttel, in Lower Saxony, Germany. Its seat was in the village Schladen. It was disbanded on 1 November 2013, when the municipality Schladen-Werla was formed.

The Samtgemeinde Schladen consisted of the following municipalities:

1. Gielde
2. Hornburg
3. Schladen
4. Werlaburgdorf
