= Royal palace of Werla =

10th-century palace of the Holy Roman Empire, located in Lower Saxony

- near Werlaburgdorf, Schladen-Werla in Wolfenbüttel
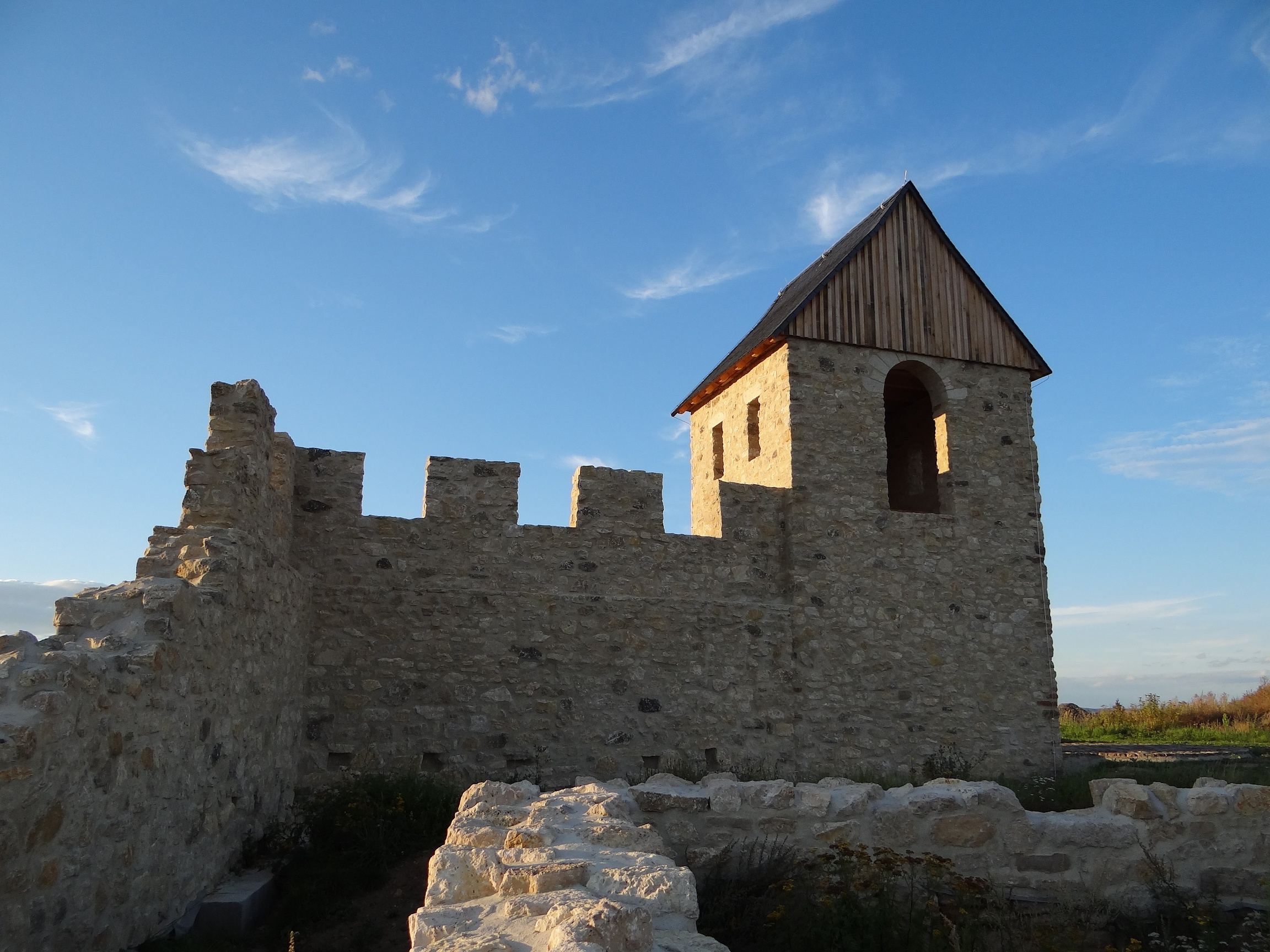
- West tower of the palace complex as reconstructed in 2012

Site information
- Type: Königspfalz
- Condition: Foundation walls visible, reconstructed earthworks and walls

Location
- Coordinates: 52.037683°N 10.554771°E
- Area: c. 20 ha (49 acres)
- Height: 110 m (360 ft)

Site history
- Built: 9th century

Garrison information
- Occupants: King of the Romans / Holy Roman Emperor

The Royal Palace of Werla (German: Königspfalz Werla) is located near Werlaburgdorf (municipality: Schladen-Werla) in Lower Saxony. The grounds of the royal palace cover about 20 hectares rising atop Kreuzberg hill, a 17 m high natural plateau overlooking the Oker river. In the Early Middle Ages the palace was an important place in the Holy Roman Empire, serving as an important base for the Ottonians in the 10th century in particular. Although it subsequently lost its political significance to the newly established Imperial Palace of Goslar at Rammelsberg, it developed into an independent settlement with a busy industrial quarter. In the 14th century it fell into ruin and was completely unknown until its rediscovery in the 18th century. The core fortress in particular was thoroughly excavated in the 20th century. Excavations carried out since 2007 have brought new understanding to the hitherto largely unexplored outworks. Since 2010 the palace complex with foundation and enceinte, as well as earthworks, has been partially reconstructed and is now open to the public as the Archäologie- und Landschaftspark Kaiserpfalz Werla (Archaeological and Wilderness Park of the Imperial Palace of Werla).

== Location ==
The palace is one of the five most important Ottonian and Salian palaces in modern Lower Saxony (The other four are Goslar, Dahlum, Grona, Pöhlde).

The palace complex is located about 15 km south of Wolfenbüttel and northeast of Goslar. It is located in the free lands between Schladen und Werlaburgdorf. There is no direct access for vehicles. However, there is a carpark on the road between the two places, on the right hand side as one travels from Schladen, from which the complex can be reached on foot in a few minutes. Alternatively, one can follow a trail along the Wedde and then left along the banks of the Oker. The heritage house Alte Mühle (Old Mill) in Schladen is a convenient starting point. After two kilometres one is confronted with a 17m high plateau on which the palace is located.

The nearby town of Werlaburgdorf first acquired its name in 1958. Before that it was simply called Burgdorf.

== Palace complex ==
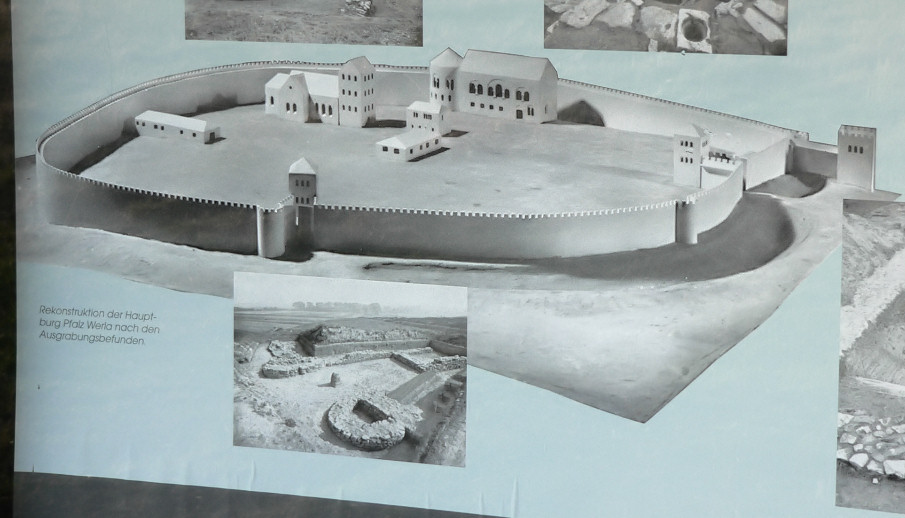
Reconstruction of the upper fortress of Werla Palace on a public display for visitors

The main fortress was a cross-shaped complex with a diameter of about 150 m. It sat on the Kreuzberg hill with two sides directly abutting on steep 17-metre-high (56 ft) banks of the river Oker. This fortified area was surrounded by a metre thick enceinte and a 9-metre-wide and 4-metre-deep moat. The curtain walls linked two or more gates and several towers. Three baileys were connected to the (older) donjon: the 1st and 2nd inner baileys and the outer bailey. Altogether, an area of around 20 hectares was enclosed within the fortifications. The baileys had similarly deep ditches, but with earthworks (probably equipped with palisades) instead of a wall. There were further buildings within the main fortress:

- Chapel (23 × 7.5 m)
- cabinet (5 × 8 m)
- Hall building (17 × 7 m)
- Palas I (22 m long with heating system)
- Palas II (15 × 34 m)
- Underground "Escape route" (35 m long)
- So-called "watch houses" (Wachhäuser), so-called "kitchen buildings" (Küchenhäuser) and cellar.

A reconstructed model of Werla Palace is on display in the Braunschweigisches Landesmuseum. It shows the complex in its 10th-century incarnation, with individual stone buildings and a stone ring wall. The model represents the state of research on Werla as of 1985. Subsequent excavations have altered the picture somewhat.

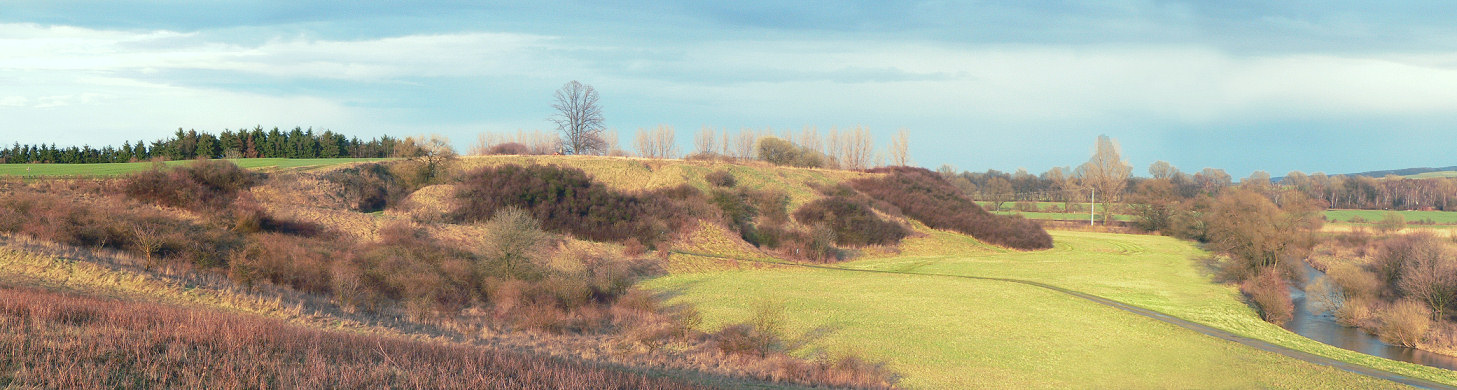
Site of the early Königspfalz of Werla in a natural outcrop above the Oker with the area of the distinct, individual buildings in the centre

== History ==
=== Prehistory and Etymology ===
The raised area above the Oker was probably settled in prehistoric times as indicated by numerous finds from that period, mainly ceramic, but also stone and bone tools. In autumn 2010 a grave richly supplied with ceramic grave goods from the late Baalberg Culture was discovered. It contained the skeleton of an older woman and a small child.

The etymology of Werla is not entirely clear. In 1935 the etymologist Edward Schröder proposed the theory that Werla meant Männerwald (Forest of Man). In his view, the name derived from the Latin or Germanic words for "man" (vir and wer respectively) and the rest of the name would be the suffix -la(h), an alternative word for "forest". Schröder then suggested that the name referred to a "holy forest area" in the region of the later palace in which Gau officers met to discuss matters. Another view, advanced by W. Flechsig.

The most recent excavations revealed indications of a gap in habitation between the Roman Imperial period (1st-3rd centuries AD) and the Early Middle Ages (8th/9th centuries). The number of pottery finds from this time period proved very low and none of the buildings that were uncovered can be dated to this period.

Evidence for habitation on the surface is first apparent in the 9th century. A sort of fortified farmstead existed at this time. A ring wall encompassed several wooden buildings in the area of the later donjon.

=== Palatial period ===
At the beginning of the 10th century, the construction of the fortified palace complex occurred. The first documentary attestations also belong to this period. In his Saxon Chronicle the Saxon chronicler Widukind of Corvey records a stay by King Henry the Fowler which depending on the interpretation of the evidence occurred in either 924 or 926. The king took shelter there with his untrained army in the face of an attack by the Hungarians. At the same time a Hungarian leader was captured as well. This was probably Zoltán, son of the Hungarian Grand Prince Árpád. In exchange for freeing him, Henry was later able to organise a nine-year truce, which enabled him to strengthen the defenses of the Empire.

Under the Ottonians Werla experienced its first golden age, as shown by documents recording fourteen royal visits between 924 and 1013. All Ottonians visited the palace at least once; Otto the Great is recorded at Werla on five separate occasions. The visit of the Salian Conrad II in 1035 during a meeting of the Imperial Diet is doubtful, however. At least twice the royal succession was decided at the Palace. Thus, during the succession crisis in 1002, the Bavarian duke Henry IV was accepted at Werla as successor to Otto III, who had died without children. The chronicle of Thietmar of Merseburg reports he had provoked an uproar when he wasted the time reserved for an audience with visiting Abbesses. Even before the election of Conrad II in 1024, the Saxons had held discussions at Werla. In total, four meetings of Saxon nobles are known; this is not evidence for a regularly occurring Landtag, however. During the palatial period, the ring walls and the most important public buildings within the main fortress were built. To the north an original bailey developed, which at first covered only three hectares, however.

=== Settlement ===
Already under Henry II Werla had begun to lose its political importance on account of the newly established palace at Goslar, which controlled the rich vein of silver at Rammelsberg. However, Werla's palace status was not abolished as the Sachsenspiegel would later claim. In 1086 Henry IV leased around 400 Hufen of the palace's estate to Udo von Gleichen-Reinhausen, Bishop of Hildesheim, probably a gift to secure the bishop's support in the Investiture Controversy. The loss of political significance did not cause the complex to fall into decay. On the contrary, in the eleventh and twelfth centuries the first bailey was massively expanded to the west and strengthen with a new, secondary donjon. Later a second outer bailey was added as well. The palace complex thus grew to cover an area of almost 20 hectares. In addition, the fortifications were strengthened by new ditches and towers and major additions were made to the central buildings of the donjon. Numerous new finds in the baileys show that a permanent settlement developed at Werla. Metal and textile workshops seem to have developed in the pit-houses of the baileys during this time. In 1180 the palace was visited by an Emperor for the last time. Frederick Barbarossa ended his conflict with his enemy Henry the Lion here, close to Braunschweig, and issued an ultimatum to his followers calling for them to surrender. That Barbaroosa returned to the old palace after such a long period of time shows that it had retained an important symbolic role in the collective consciousness of the Saxons.

=== Decay & ruin ===
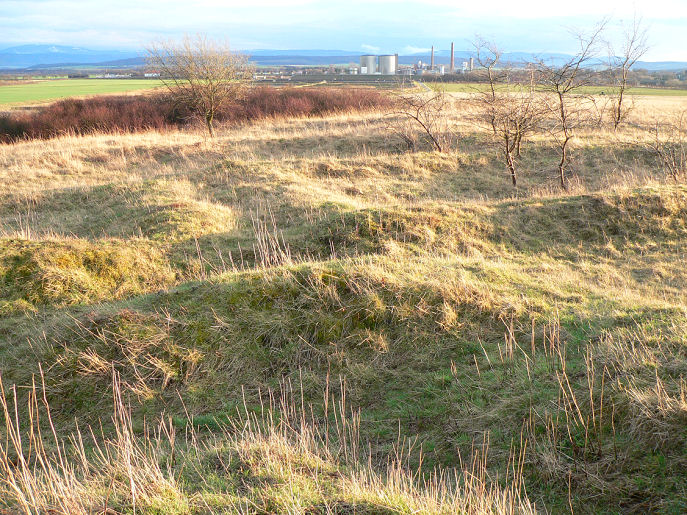
Remains of palace foundations (2006), in the background Schladen with its sugar factory

In 1240 the Bishop of Hildesheim gave the tithe of Werla to Heiningen Abbey. The church of the old palace was taken over by the abbey as well, having been under the administration of Dorstadt Abbey for a little while. In the 13th century there is evidence of renewed building activity. Inside the donjon, graves and cellar buildings were built, whose purpose is not entirely clear. Into the 14th century it is still possible to detect signs of habitation, but Werla and its parish church seem to have fallen into ruin by 1550 at the latest. Some of the residents probably moved to Burgdorf to the east, which is now called Werlaburgdorf. The villagers and in some cases Heiningen Abbey made use of the building material as a cheap building material. In the following centuries, the name was used several times in reference to the fields on the hilltop in documents. Until 1817 a chapel still stood on the site, its origin no longer known to the locals. With the disappearance of the last visible walls, knowledge of the royal palace disappeared from the memory of man.

However, around 50 textual references to the palace's existence from the 10th to the 13th century remained, including royal documents and chronicles.

== Archaeological investigation ==
=== Rediscovery and initial investigation ===
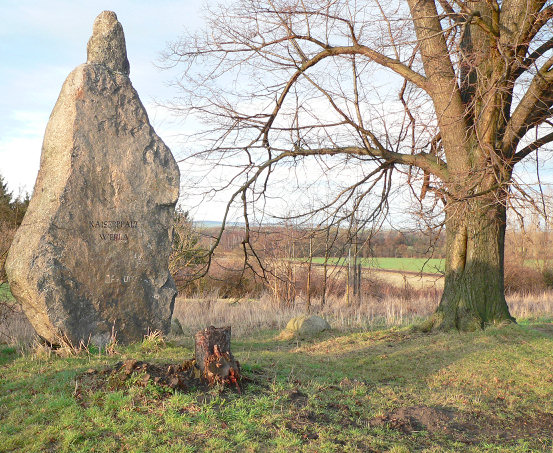
The 4 metre high memorial stone erected in the palace area in 1875.

The first attempts to locate Werla palace took place in the 19th century. Suspected candidates included the Burg Werle in Mecklenburg and Werl in Westphalia. Hermann Adolf Lüntzel's study of the documents in the middle of the 19th century narrowed the location down to the neighbourhood of Schladen. Local farmers had reported that they had ploughed up stones on Kreuzberg. In 1875, the Bauinspektor of Goslar Palace, E. F. A. Schulze dug a small ditch and revealed some foundations which were seen as clear evidence of the palace. In commemoration a stone was set up inscribed Kaiserpfalz Werla and a linden tree was planted which can still be seen today. Further scholarly investigations were not undertaken, however. Around 1920 a teacher in Schladen, Franz Kaufmann, became interested in Werla and called archaeological interest to the palace. This led to a one-day test excavation under the leadership of the architectural historian Uvo Hölscher of the Technical University of Hannover. As a result of increased scholarly interest Goslar District bought part of the land in the area of the donjon in 1929 in order to protect it from further ploughing damage. In 1933 the Werla Commission was founded which consisted of scholars and representatives of Goslar District and the central government. They were to co-ordinate the excavations planned to follow.

=== Excavations between 1934 and 1939 ===
In the year 1934 the first excavation campaign organised by the Werla commission began. It was led by civil engineer Karl Becker. Prehistoric finds were expected and Hermann Schroller of the Hannover Provincial Museum was consulted on these. For the first time, the surrounding area was subjected to scholarly investigation. Becker became ill in the following year and was no longer able to undertake excavations, so the architectural historian Heinrich Steckeweh was appointed acting head of excavations. But in 1937, for unclear reasons the Werla commission decided to put Hermann Schroller in charge of the whole excavation, even though he specialised solely in prehistory. At any rate, he endeavoured to further increase the high official interest in the excavations. Scholars, party officials and classes of school children were shown around the site and the latest discoveries were published in the press. A film was even produced for educational purposes. Through his numerous political contacts, Scholler who was an NSDAP member, was able to secure the support of the Reichsarbeitsdienst and even the Army Aviation School of Hildesheim for the excavation. In 1937 aerial investigation making use of stereophotography for the first time ever brought sensational revelations. Areas of soil discolouration were apparent from the photos which revealed the outlines of the palace and its baileys (c. 600 x 600 m). The new evidence led to great interest among experts.

Also new and innovative was the use of modern chemical analysis and the interdisciplinary interaction between architectural historians, archaeologists and geologists in identifying the building remains. Despite the use of advanced techniques, the documentation of the excavations suffers from significant technical issues. Finds were constantly reinterpreted and published results corrected. The poor-quality and hasty interpretation of discoveries cannot be fully explained by Schroller's lack of professional training – an important factor was the strong ideological influence of Nazism. A specific idea of an Ottonian palace was imposed on Werla, which was referred to as the "Cradle of the First Reich", which the Nazis considered to be the direct ancestor of Nazi Germany. Accordingly, attempts were made to date the finds to the Ottonian period as much as possible, and preferably to the reign of the so-called "Reich-founder" Henry I. Furthermore, there were vicious internal conflicts among the leaders of the excavations. The resulting interpretative errors have continued to trouble scholarly literature to this day. With the outbreak of the Second World War, the excavations came to an early end.

=== Renewed excavations: 1957-1964 ===
At the resumption of excavation in 1957, Hermann Schroller was once again appointed as the head of excavation. After his unexpected death in 1959, his students Gudrun Stelzer and Carl-Heinrich Seebach continued the excavations until 1964. A large part of the donjon was excavated; it is considered almost completely explored. Furthermore, traces of earlier structures were documented in detail for the first time and the significance of the renovations during the High Middle Ages to the development of the palace came to be recognised. During the excavations, thousands of individual finds were preserved, mostly pottery, but also iron and bronze items. The coins discovered came from Rostock, Göttingen, Bremen and other mints and mostly dated from the 13th century. Evidence for short visits by high-ranking individuals was lacking and the early royal presence was reflected only in the construction work at the complex. The two baileys were only patchily investigated. The approximate course of the fortifications was determined by large test trenches, in which remains of workshops and pit-houses were revealed for the first time. The theory that the baileys had served purely as "army-forts" (Heerburgen) was therefore disproven. On account of the new information historians were focused on the archaeological finds for many years. The role of the palace as a defensive fortificationa against the Hungarians increasingly retreated into the background. Instead, focus fell in particular on the role of the palace as an important regional centre of government and economy.

=== Festival, 2005 ===
On the 21 and 22 May 2005 a festival entitled Pfalz Werla – Leben vor 1000 Jahren (Werla Palace: Life before the 1000s) was held on the palace grounds. 300 actors, 130 tents, a dozen horses and five guns entertained around 17,000 visitors with three time periods: "Europe around 1000 AD," "Welf and Staufen period in the Middle Ages" as well as "the Late Middle Ages" looking at the defensive techniques and crafts of an urban community. The festival was meant to support Braunschweig's (unsuccessful) application to be a European Capital of Culture for 2010. For the application Wolfenbüttel district also commissioned a study published in 2003 which proposed a lavish reconstruction of the palace. The project was cancelled in 2005 when Braunschweig's application was rejected in favour of Essen with Ruhr.2010, Pécs and Istanbul.

=== Excavation between 2007 and 2012 ===
The excavations have not come to an end as of September 2012; a comprehensive publication is still pending. However, the latest results shed further light on the continual change and development of Werla, providing an insight into its economic life and providing important data for the projected reconstruction and visualisation.

==== Excavation in the donjon ====
In spring 2007, renewed excavations began in the donjon. The chapel, the buildings, gates and walls were uncovered until 2008 and re-surveyed. The evidence later provided the foundations for a reconstruction within the scope of the "Archäologie- und Landschaftsparks Kaiserpfalz Werla." Along with the sighting and checking of already known finds, new discoveries were also made. Thus, the wall plan of the earlier 9th century complex was accurately documented. In addition, new techniques in mortar analysis and comparison to similar buildings enabled individual buildings to be dated more accurately and certainly. A geological investigation of the building stone provided the foundations for determining the weight of the central buildings. The transport costs and workload associated with the construction of the building could therefore be roughly calculated for the first time. This indicated that the construction of the donjon would have taken many years and that the majority of the construction materials came from the surrounding region. The relationship of Werla with Schladen and Burgdorf also needs to be rethought. Schladen was hitherto understood as the location of the Curtis, the palace's economic centre. However, this may be contradicted by the new evidence which might show that the baileys were inhabited in several periods and were used for a much longer time than previously thought. With respect to Burgdorf, the 9th/10th century graveyard is important, since it was likely the burial ground of a village (Dorf) whose inhabitants probably worked in the palace's demesne.

==== Excavation in the bailey ====
Furthermore, a geomagnetic survey of the baileys was carried out. The resulting data enabled a new reconstruction of the palace's history. West of the north tower, a wall was discovered, which later excavations dated to the 10th or 11th century by means of ceramic finds. Surprisingly, this wall appeared to divide the inner bailey from north to south. Thus the construction of the bailey has to be divided into at least two phases. In the palatial period, then, the bailey was considerablyu smaller than it was later and was first expanded to the west and fortified with an additional ditch in the High Middle Ages. Part of this development is probably indicated by another ditch, which was discovered in the area of the so-called Chapel Hill (Kapellenberg). On this hill, the external remains of stone buildings were discovered which were probably built in connection with the foundation of another donjon. New aerial photographs and a systematic survey of the area helped to more closely determine the layout and arrangement of various workshops within the bailey. Some of these buildings may be examined more closely in the future. Through wide-scale excavations paved streets, pit-houses, waste pits and traces of a hay barrack were brought to light. Remains of looms and loom-weights in one spot indicate an area used for textile production, while clay nozzles of bellows and slag in another location indicate a metalworking area. Finally, the excavations focussed on the fortification system of the inner bailey. In the investigation of the walls and ditches, an embankment was discovered which was located immediately behind the walls.

==== Neolithic grave ====
In October 2010 the Braunschweig district archaeologists discovered three female skeletons dated to around 3700 BC in the course of a field school excavation with students. The women's ages at death were determined to be 4, 20 and 45 years old, with the child spatially associated with the twenty-year-old woman. More than thirty vessels from the Baalberge group were also discovered.

== Archaeological and Wilderness park of the Imperial Palace of Werla ==
Building on the plans made when the 2007 excavations were begun, the remains of the palace were turned into a public park, the "Archaeological and Wilderness park of the Imperial Palace of Werla" (Archäologie- und Landschaftspark Kaiserpfalz Werla). Therefore, in 2008 the Lower Saxon Ministry for Scholarship and Culture purchased the surrounding fields. Meanwhile, around 1.5 million euro were invested in the project. Work was carried out with the advice of the Ostfalen Open-air and Experiential Museum and the Harz – Brunswick Land – Eastphalia National Geopark, beginning in autumn 2010. On 14 September 2012 the Minister-President David McAllister officially inaugurated the park.

Through the restoration of the earthworks and ditches, the impressive scale of the donjon and bailey complex has been made clear. For their protection the foundations of the original earthworks were covered over with the earth of the new earthworks. In the area of the donjon the walls of the buildings were partially reconstructed and the "West tower" (tower II of the donjon) was fully reconstructed to give an idea of the appearance of the buildings as a whole.

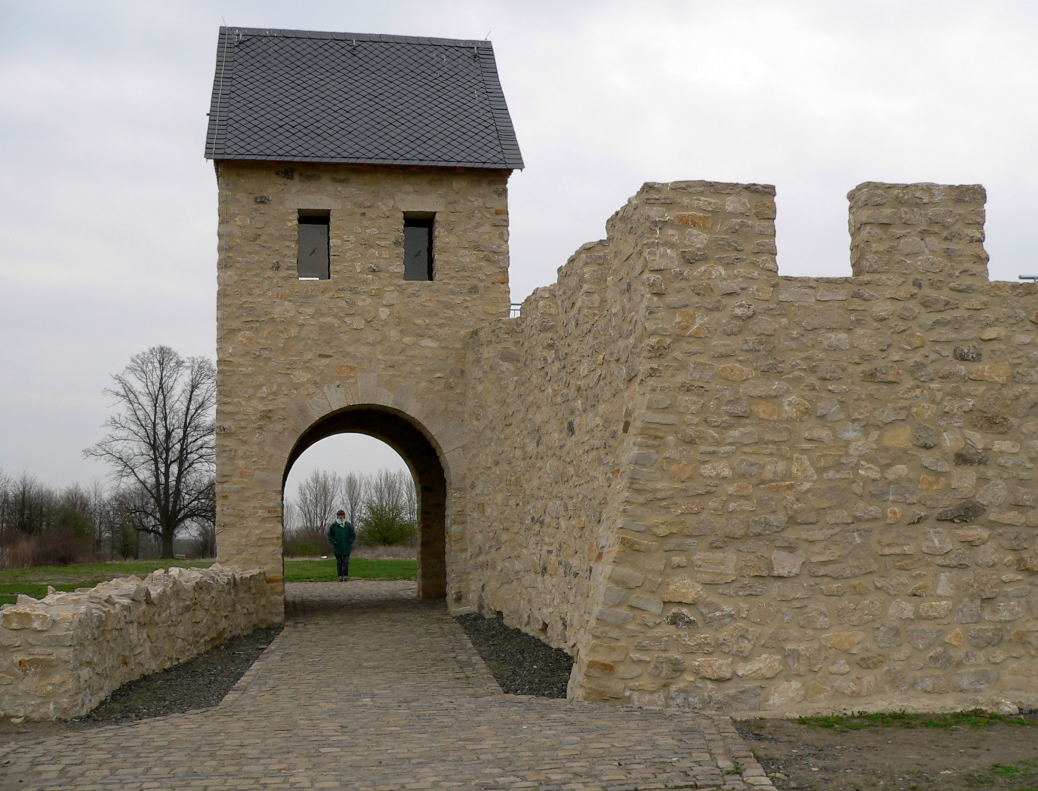
Gatehouse in the west tower (2013)

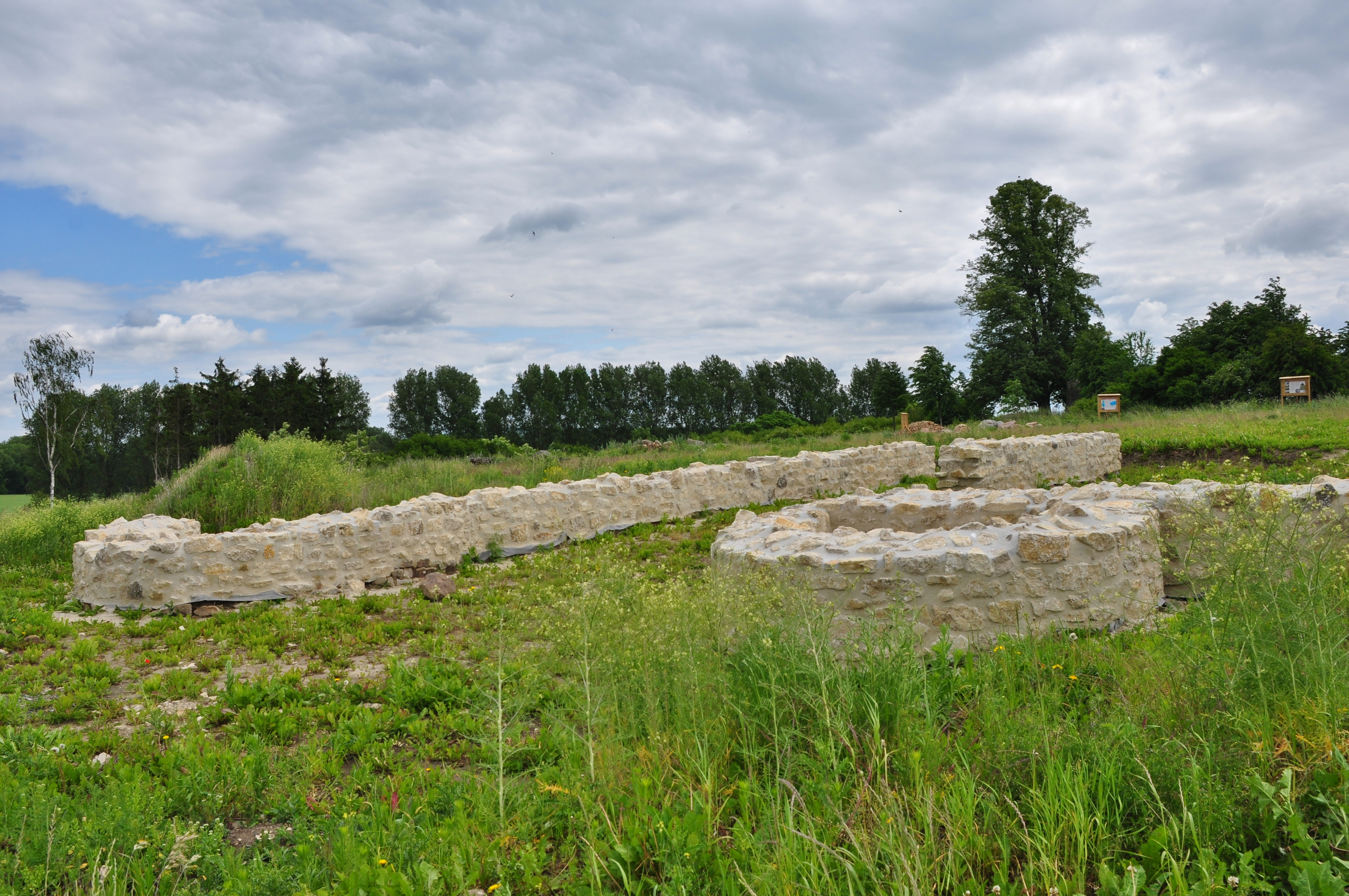
Exposed and raised walls of the north tower

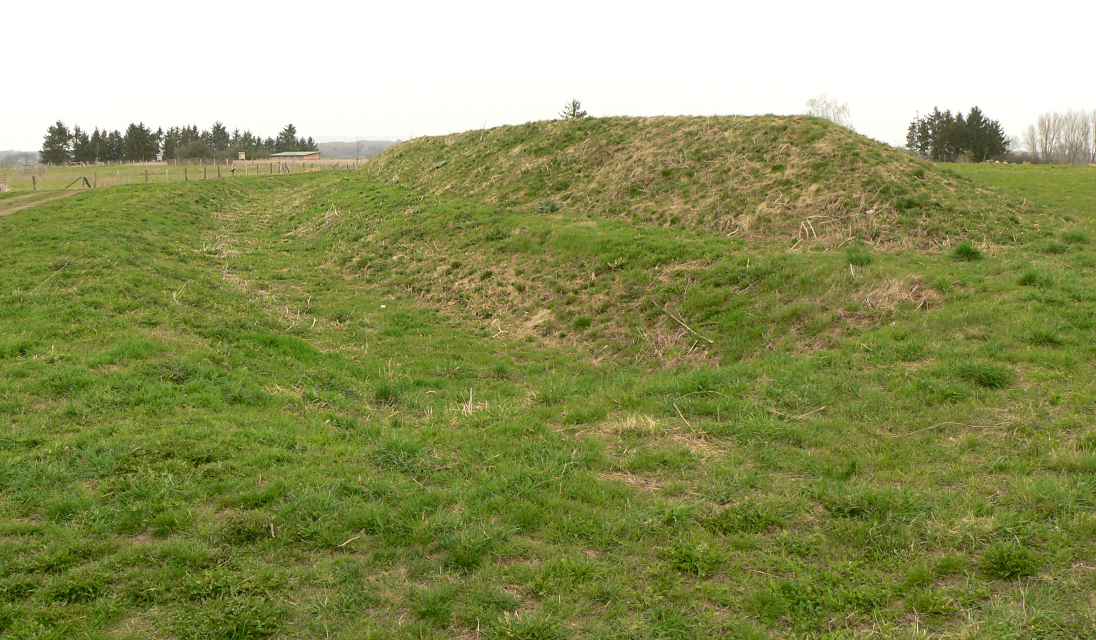
Reconstructed earthwork-ditch system

== Bibliography ==
- Carl Bochers. Werla-Regesten. Zeitschrift des Harz-Vereins für Geschichte und Altertumskunde 68, 1935, pp. 15–27.
- Clara Redlich. Die Knochennadeln von Werla. Die Kunde 3, 1936, pp. 59–65.
- Hermann Schroller. Ein steinzeitliches Hockergrab von der Werlaburg. Die Kunde 3, 1935, pp. 57–59.
- Martin V. Rudolph. Die baugeschichtlichen Ergebnisse der Ausgrabungen 1937 [Werla]. Die Kunde 6, 1938, pp. 106–118.
- Martin V. Rudolph. Pfalz Werla. Die baugeschichtlichen Ergebnisse der Ausgrabung 1938. Die Kunde 7, 1939, pp. 79–94.
- Carl-Heinrich Seebach. Freilegung einer frühmittelalterlichen Heißluftheizung auf der sächsischen Königspfalz Werla. Mannus 33, 1941, pp. 256–273.
- Wilhelm Geilmann. Glasscheiben aus der Kaiserpfalz Werla. Die Kunde N. F. 7, 1956, pp. 41–46.
- Wilhelm Geilmann. Der Mörtel der Kaiserpfalz Werla. Die Kunde N. F. 7, 1956, pp. 96–113.
- Wilhelm Berges. Zur Geschichte des Werla-Goslarer Reichsbezirks vom 9. bis zum 11. Jahrhundert. In: Deutsche Königspfalzen. Beiträge zu ihrer historischen und archäologischen Erforschung. Veröffentlichungen des Max-Planck-Institutes für Geschichte 11/1, Göttingen 1963, pp. 113–157.
- Horst Fesser, Ulrich Horst. Herkunfts- und Altersbestimmung einer alten Erzschlacke aus dem nordwestdeutschen Harzvorland. Die Kunde N.F. 14, 1963, pp. 240–254.
- A. Gauert. Zur Struktur und Topografie der Königspfalzen. In: Deutsche Königspfalzen. Beiträge zu ihrer historischen und archäologischen Erforschung. Veröffentlichungen des Max-Planck-Instituts für Geschichte 11/2, Göttingen 1965, pp. 1–60.
- Sabine Krüger. Einige Bemerkungen zur Werla-Forschung. In: Deutsche Königspfalzen. Beiträge zu ihrer historischen und archäologischen Erforschung. Veröffentlichungen des Max-Planck-Instituts für Geschichte 11/2, Göttingen 1965, pp. 210–264.
- Hans-Jürgen Rieckenberg. Zur Geschichte der Pfalz Werla nach der schriftlichen Überlieferung. In: Deutsche Königspfalzen. Beiträge zu ihrer historischen und archäologischen Erforschung. Veröffentlichungen des Max-Planck-Instituts für Geschichte 11/2, Göttingen 1965, pp. 174–209.
- Carl-Heinrich Seebach. Die Königspfalz Werla. Die baugeschichtlichen Untersuchungen. Göttinger Schriften zur Vor- und Frühgeschichte 8, Neumünster 1967.
- Adolf Gauert. Das Palatium der Pfalz Werla. Archäologischer Befund und schriftliche Überlieferung. In: Deutsche Königspfalzen. Beiträge zu ihrer historischen und archäologischen Erforschung. Veröffentlichungen des Max-Planck-Instituts für Geschichte 11/3, Göttingen 1979, pp. 263–277.
- Ralf Busch. Zur Metallverarbeitung auf der Werla. Harz-Zeitschrift 37, 1985, pp. 49–54.
- Edgar Ring. Heißluftheizungen im Harzgebiet. Harz-Zeitschrift 37, 1985, pp. 37–48.
- Volker Zedelius. Fundmünzen der Werla. Harz-Zeitschrift 37, 1985, pp. 55–60.
- Ernst A. Friedrich. Der Werlahügel bei Schladen. In: Wenn Steine reden könnten. Landbuch-Verlag, Hannover 1989, ISBN 3-7842-0397-3, pp. 115–117.
- Edgar Ring. Die Königspfalz Werla. Die mittelalterliche Keramik. Forschungen und Berichte des Braunschweigischen Landesmuseums 1, Braunschweig 1990.
- Hans W. Heine. Frühe Burgen und Pfalzen in Niedersachsen – Von den Anfängen bis zum frühen Mittelalter. Wegweiser zur Vor- und Frühgeschichte Niedersachsens 17, Hildesheim 1995.
- Günther Binding. Deutsche Königspfalzen. Von Karl dem Großen bis Friedrich II. (765–1240). Darmstadt 1996.
- Klaus Bingenheimer. Die Luftheizungen des Mittelalters. Zur Typologie und Entwicklung eines technikgeschichtlichen Phänomens. Antiquitates 17, Hamburg 1998.
- Rüdiger Schniek. Mittelalterliche Warmluftheizungen in Norddeutschland und Dänemark. Offa 56, 1999, pp. 171–181.
- Robert Slawski. Königspfalz Werla Forschungsreise in das 10. Jahrhundert. 1. Auflage. Zelter Verlag, Braunschweig 2005, ISBN 3-931727-05-X.
- Hans Joachim Bodenbach. Dr. Hermann Schroller (1900–1959) – Archäologe und Apotheker. In: Die Kunde (Zeitschrift für niedersächsische Archäologie), N. F. 56, Hannover 2005, pp. 191–218 (mit 3 Abb., darunter 2 Porträtphotos von Hermann Schroller).
- Michael Herdick. Herrschaftssitze und handwerklich-gewerbliche Produktion. In: J. Zeune (Hrsg.): Alltag auf Burgen im Mittelalter. Wissenschaftliches Kolloquium des Wissenschaftlichen Beirates der Deutschen Burgenvereinigung, Passau 2005. Veröffentlichungen der Deutschen Burgenvereinigung, Reihe B 10, Braubach 2006, pp. 177–184.
- Markus C. Blaich, Jörg Weber: Im Banne des Zeitgeistes – Hermann Schroller und die Ausgrabungen auf der Pfalz Werla von 1936 bis 1939. In: Die Kunde N.F. 59, 2008, pp. 147–188.
- Markus C. Blaich, H. Zellmer: Die ottonische Pfalz Werla – Überlegungen zu Baugrund und Baugestein. In: H.-G. Röhling, H. Zellmer (Hrsg.): GeoTop 2008 „Landschaft lesen lernen“ – 12. Internationale Jahrestagung der Fachsektion GeoTop der Deutschen Gesellschaft für Geowissenschaften, 30. April – 4. Mai 2008 in Königslutter. Schriftenreihe der Deutschen Gesellschaft für Geowissenschaften, Heft 56, Hannover 2008, pp. 27–39.
- Markus C. Blaich, Michael Geschwinde, Andreas Memmert, Frank Oesterhelweg, Uwe Rullmann, Karl-Friedrich Weber: Pfalz Werla – zwischen archäologischer Forschung, Naturschutz und touristischer Erschließung. In: Berichte zur Denkmalpflege in Niedersachsen. 2010, pp. 6–9.
- Markus C. Blaich, Michael Geschwinde: Das neue Werla-Projekt: Rettung für die Königspfalz? In: Archäologie in Niedersachsen 13. 2010, pp. 120–124.
- Markus C. Blaich: Rezeption der Grabungen in der Pfalz Werla in Archäologie und Geschichtswissenschaft. In: U. Ickerodt, F. Mahler (Hrsg.): Archäologie und völkisches Gedankengut: Zum Umgang mit dem eigenen Erbe. Frankfurt 2010, pp. 45–54.
- Christian Frey: Burgen und symbolische Kommunikation – Werla und Harzburg. Burgen und Schlösser 2010, pp. 2–7.
- Caspar Ehlers: Königliche Burgen und Pfalzen als Zentren für den reisenden Hof des ostfränkischen Reiches. Concilium medii aevi 14, 2011, pp. 3–19.
- Michael Geschwinde: Die ungewöhnliche Lehrgrabung der TU Braunschweig auf der Königspfalz Werla. Archäologie in Niedersachsen 14, 2011, pp. 87–89.
- Markus C. Blaich: Bemerkungen zu den ökonomischen und ökologischen Bezügen ottonischer Königspfalzen. In: B. U. Hucker, J. Leuschner (Hrsg.): Unvollendete und verschollene Städte. Ein vergessenes Kapitel Stadtgeschichte in den Welfenlanden. Salzgitter-Jahrbuch 30, 2012, pp. 157–170.
- Markus C. Blaich: Der Archäologie- und Landschaftspark „Kaiserpfalz Werla“ – Zur Visualisierung eines archäologischen Denkmals im Kontext von Natur- und Landschaftsschutz. In: Berichte zur Denkmalpflege in Niedersachsen. 2/2012, pp. 89–94.
- Markus C. Blaich: Werla – Fronhof, Königspfalz und Ansiedlung des 9.–13. Jahrhunderts. In: Chateau Gaillard 25, 2012, pp. 27–37.
- Markus C. Blaich, Michael Geschwinde: Die Ausgrabungen auf der Königspfalz Werla 2007 bis 2011 – Vorbericht. In: Nachrichten aus Niedersachsens Urgeschichte, Bd. 81, Stuttgart 2012.
