= Werlaburgdorf =

- Ortsteil of Schladen-Werla
- Interactive map of Werlaburgdorf
- Location within Germany Location within Lower Saxony
- Coordinates: 52°03′N 10°32′E
- Country: Germany
- State: Lower Saxony
- District: Wolfenbüttel
- Municipality: Schladen-Werla

Area
  - Total: 12.01 km^{2} (4.64 sq mi)
- Elevation: 100 m (330 ft)

Population (2012-12-31)
  - Total: 770
  - Density: 64/km^{2} (170/sq mi)
- Time zone: UTC+01:00 (CET)
  - Summer (DST): UTC+02:00 (CEST)
- Postal codes: 38315
- Dialling codes: 05335
- Vehicle registration: WF
- Website: www.werlaburgdorf.de

Werlaburgdorf (German pronunciation: [vɛʁlaˈbʊʁkdɔʁf]; Burgdorf until 1958) is a village and a former municipality in the district of Wolfenbüttel, Lower Saxony, Germany. Since 1 November 2013, it is part of the municipality Schladen-Werla.

== Geography ==
The village is located north of the Harz mountain range, about 13 km (8.1 mi) south of Wolfenbüttel and 15 km (9.3 mi) northeast of Goslar. It is situated between the forested Oderwald hill range in the northwest and the confluence of the Warne creek with the Oker River in the east.

Werlaburgdorf has access to the Bundesautobahn 395 motorway at the Schladen junction. The former station was a stop on the Warnetal railway line from Börßum to Salzgitter-Bad until service discontinued in 1976. Today heritage railway traffic is provided by DRB Class 41 and DRG Kleinlokomotive Class II locomotives.

== History ==
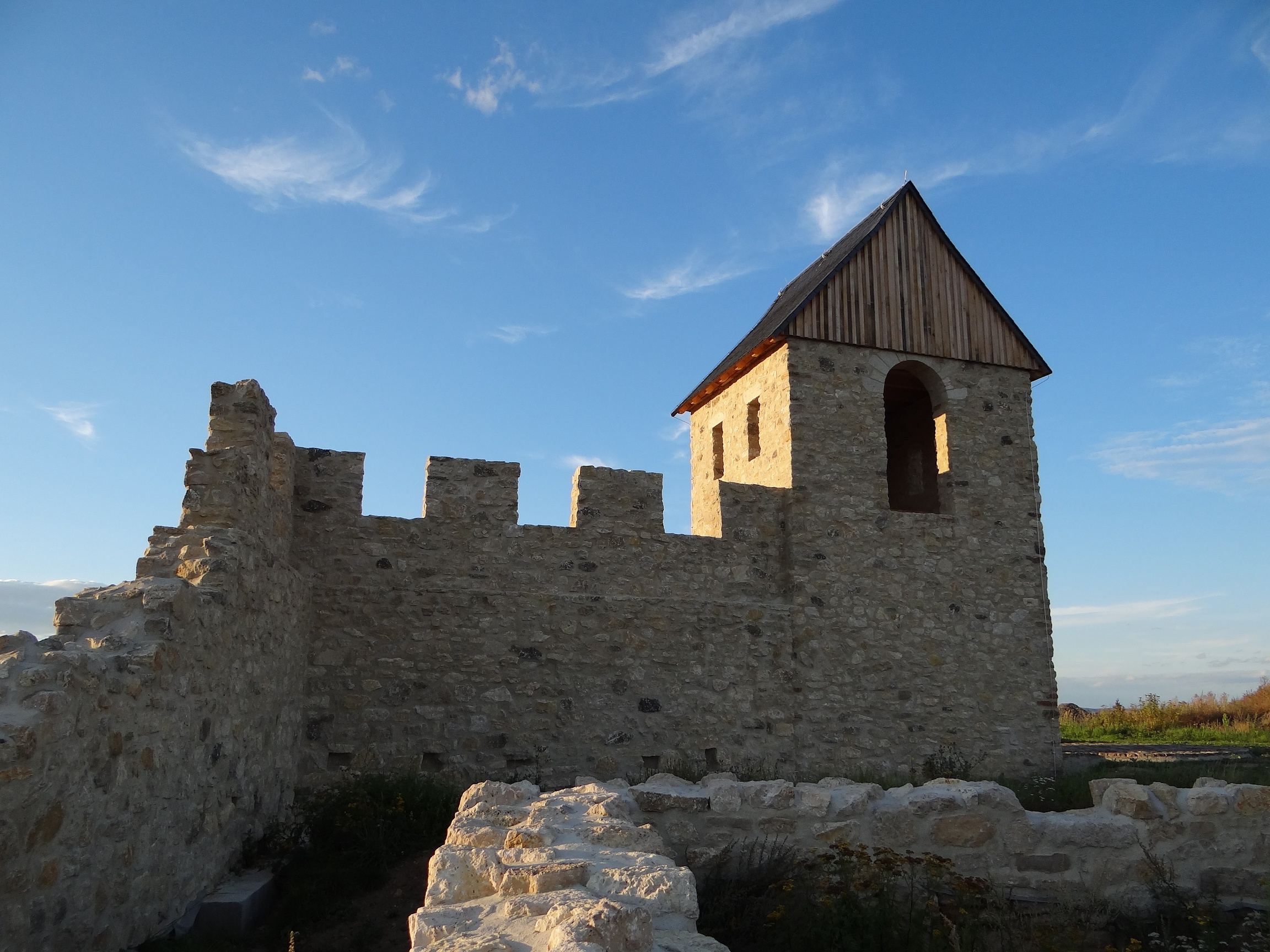
Reconstructed tower of former Werla Castle

Archaeological finds on the plateau above the Oker east of the village date back to the Baalberge group of the Neolithic. In the 10th century the German royal Ottonian dynasty had the Werla Pfalz erected within their Saxon homelands of Eastphalia, like the nearby castles of Goslar, Dahlum, Grona and Pöhlde. The assumption that the spur had been the site of a Saxon sacred grove and thing assembly has not been established.

According to the Res gestae Saxonicae by chronicler Widukind of Corvey, King Henry the Fowler in 924 or 926 was besieged here by Hungarian cavalry during their invasion into Saxony. While the horses sank into the swampy area of the nearby river, Henry managed to capture a Hungarian nobleman—probably Zoltán, son of Grand Prince Árpád—and to reach an agreement on a nine-years-truce, after which he was able to defeat the magyars at the 933 Battle of Riade. Henry's son Otto the Great provably stayed at the Pfalz five times. Upon the sudden death of Emperor Otto III in 1002, Margrave Henry of Schweinfurt and late Otto's sisters Sophia of Gandersheim and Adelaide of Quedlinburg met with the Saxon princes at Werla, in order to promote the succession of the Ottonian duke Henry IV of Bavaria against his rivals Margrave Eckard of Meissen and Duke Herman II of Swabia.

Henry was crowned King of the Romans (as Henry II) by Archbishop Willigis of Mainz and finally acknowledged by Duke Bernard of Saxony. From about 1005 he had the Kaiserpfalz at the nearby silver mines of Rammelsberg in Goslar rebuilt, whereafter Werla's importance diminished. In 1086 Emperor Henry IV enfeoffed the estates up to the Oker to the Bishops of Hildesheim in turn for their support during the Investiture Controversy. A last stay of the Hohenstaufen emperor Frederick Barbarossa to subjugate the Saxon princes upon the deposition of his Welf rival Duke Henry the Lion is documented for 15 August 1180. The surrounding lands passed to the monastery of Dorstadt, in 1240 they were granted to nearby Heiningen Abbey. Shortly afterwards the castle was abandoned and decayed during the following centuries, leaving no visible ruins. While the village of Burgdorf arose in the west, the location of Werla fell into oblivion, though a chapel at the site was still mentioned in 1817.

In the early 19th century, speculations were made on the site of the historic Pfalz Werla near the village of Werle near Kassow in Mecklenburg or at Werl in Westphalia. Not until 1875, the foundations were re-discovered by archaeological excavations, confirmed by digs of the Leibniz University Hannover and the Lower Saxony State Museum in 1926 and 1934 resp. Since 2007 the Lower Saxon state government has promoted the layout of an archaeological museum.
