= Gielde =

Ortsteil of Schladen-Werla in Lower Saxony, Germany

- Ortsteil of Schladen-Werla
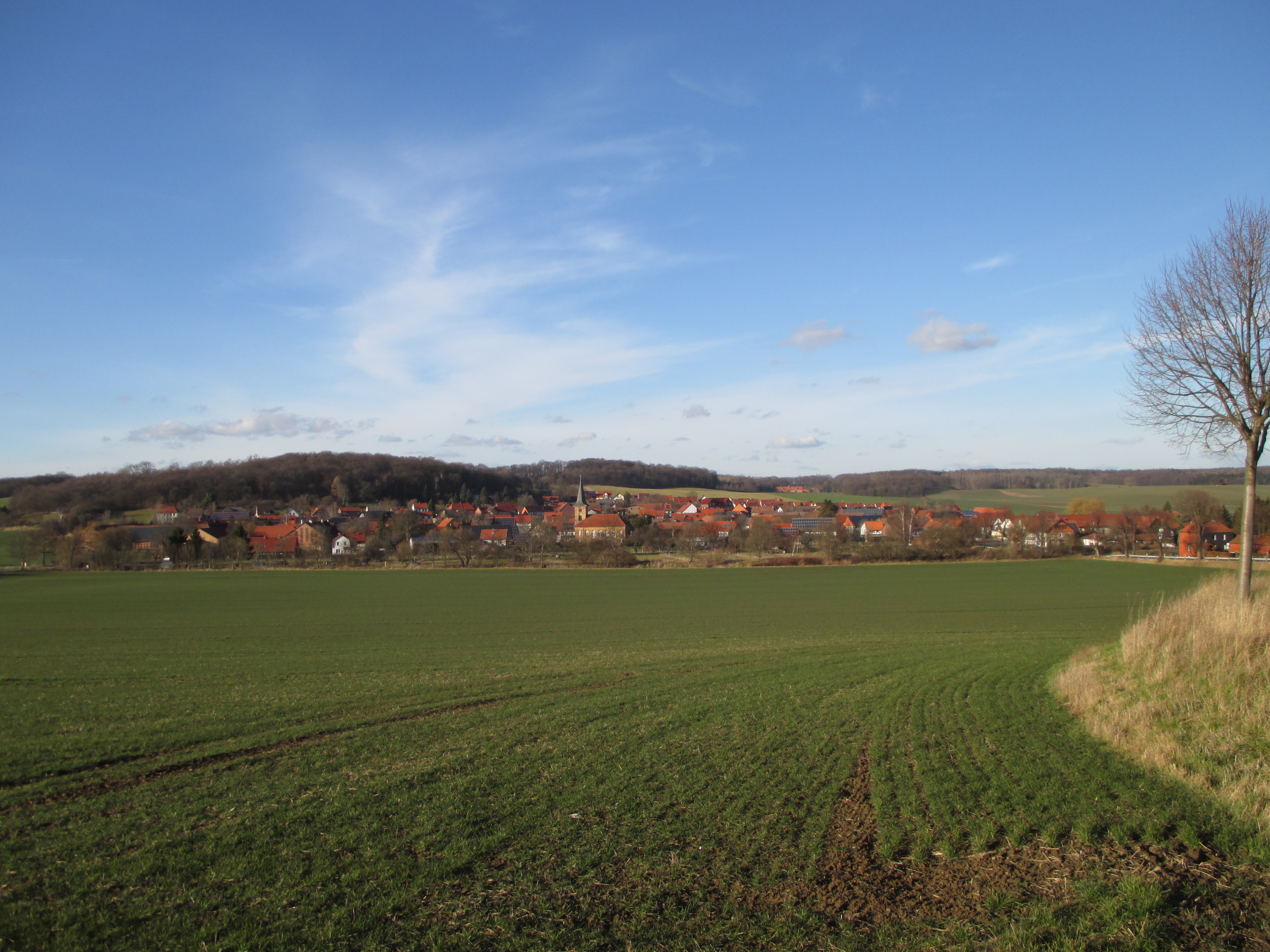
- View from the south

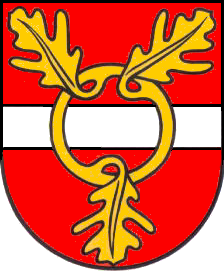
- Coat of arms
- Interactive map of Gielde
- Location within Germany Location within Lower Saxony
- Coordinates: 52°02′N 10°30′E
- Country: Germany
- State: Lower Saxony
- District: Wolfenbüttel
- Municipality: Schladen-Werla

Area
  - Total: 9.11 km^{2} (3.52 sq mi)
- Elevation: 94–152 m (308–499 ft)

Population (2012-12-31)
  - Total: 792
  - Density: 86.9/km^{2} (225/sq mi)
- Time zone: UTC+01:00 (CET)
  - Summer (DST): UTC+02:00 (CEST)
- Postal codes: 38315
- Dialling codes: 05339
- Vehicle registration: WF

Gielde (German pronunciation: [ˈɡiːldə]) is a village and a former municipality in the district of Wolfenbüttel, in Lower Saxony, Germany. Since 1 November 2013, it is part of the Schladen-Werla municipality.

== Geography ==
Gielde is situated in the northern foothills of the Harz mountain range, located between Vienenburg (part of Goslar) in the south and Wolfenbüttel in the north; neighbouring villages are Schladen in the southeast and Liebenburg in the southwest.

== History ==
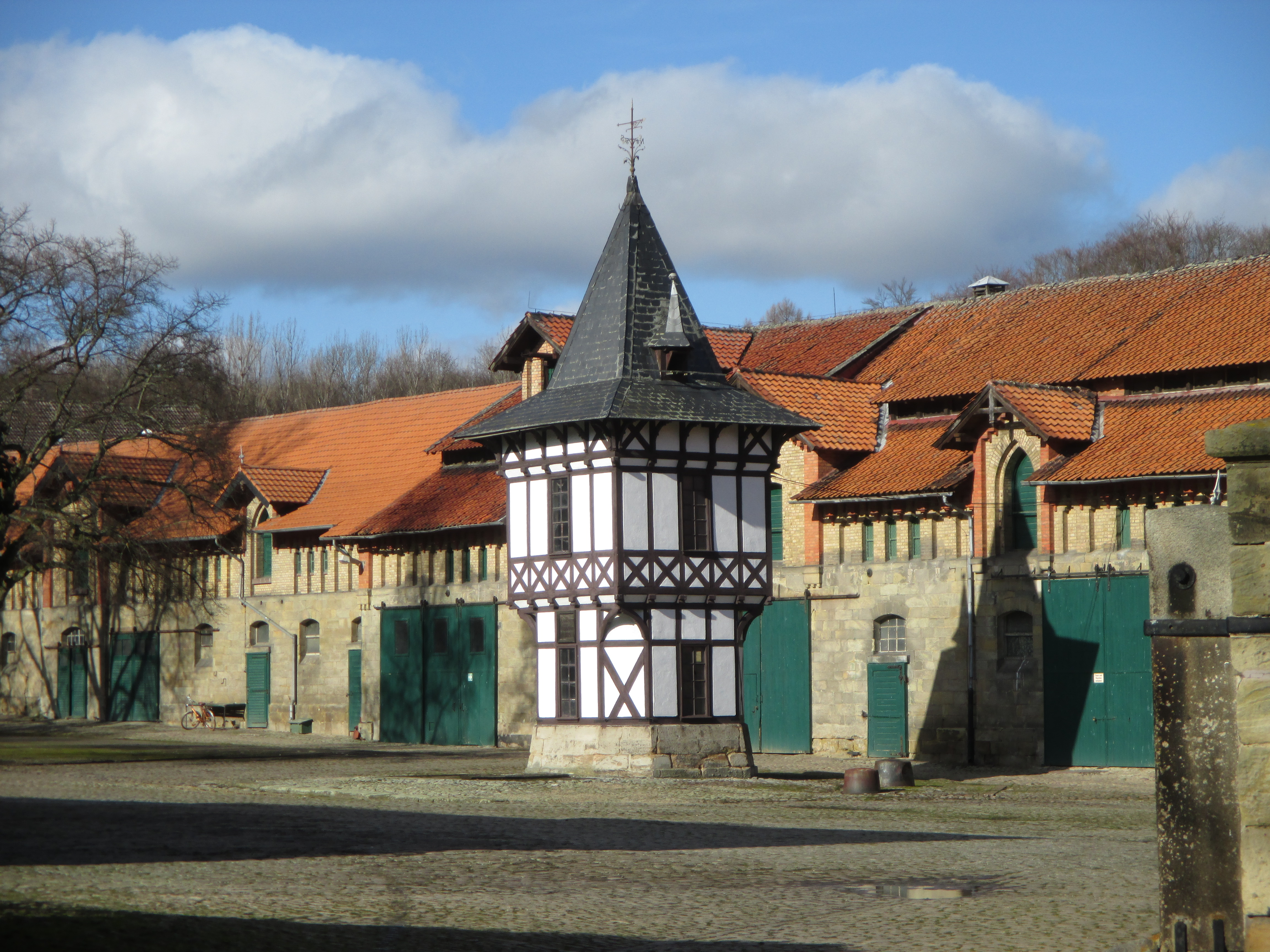
Altenrode

A settlement at the site named Gelithi was first mentioned in a 953 deed and as Gelithe in 1140. The first parish church was probably erected during the incumbency of Bishop Gotthard of Hildesheim in the early 12th century. The area then was part of the medieval Duchy of Saxony. The remnants of a Saxon hillfort (Kukeriulenburg) are visible in the north of the present-day village, possibly used as a refuge castle related to the nearby Royal palace of Werla.

The manor of Altenrode, which may have been built from stones of the decayed castle, was documented as an estate of the Heiningen monastery since 1306. When the abbey was secularised in 1810, the manor became a private property and today is a listed monument.
