= Hornburg =

- Ortsteil of Schladen-Werla
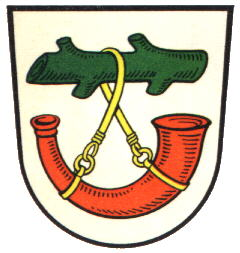
- Coat of arms
- Interactive map of Hornburg
- Location within Germany Location within Lower Saxony
- Coordinates: 52°01′N 10°37′E
- Country: Germany
- State: Lower Saxony
- District: Wolfenbüttel
- Municipality: Schladen-Werla

Area
  - Total: 22 km^{2} (8.5 sq mi)
- Elevation: 145 m (476 ft)

Population (2012-12-31)
  - Total: 2,413
  - Density: 110/km^{2} (280/sq mi)
- Time zone: UTC+01:00 (CET)
  - Summer (DST): UTC+02:00 (CEST)
- Postal codes: 38315
- Dialling codes: 05334
- Vehicle registration: WF

Hornburg (German pronunciation: [ˈhɔʁnˌbʊʁk]) is a town and a former municipality in the Wolfenbüttel district, in the German state of Lower Saxony. Since 1 November 2013, it is a part of the municipality Schladen-Werla. It is situated on the Ilse river, a tributary of the Oker. Hornburg is part of the Samtgemeinde ('collective municipality') Schladen and home to numerous historically valuable half-timber buildings (Fachwerkhäuser). It is located on the German Timber-Frame Road.

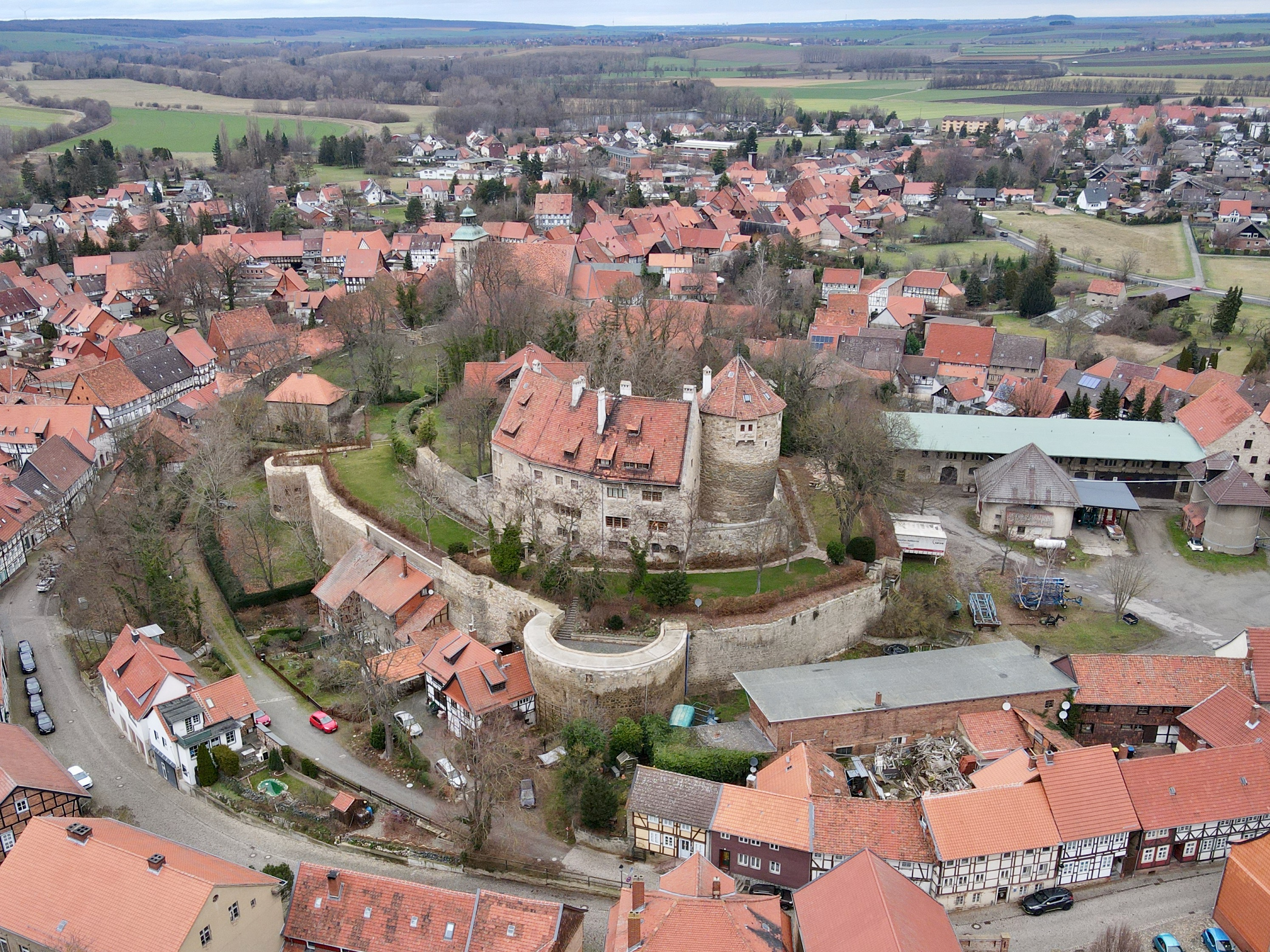
Hornburg Castle

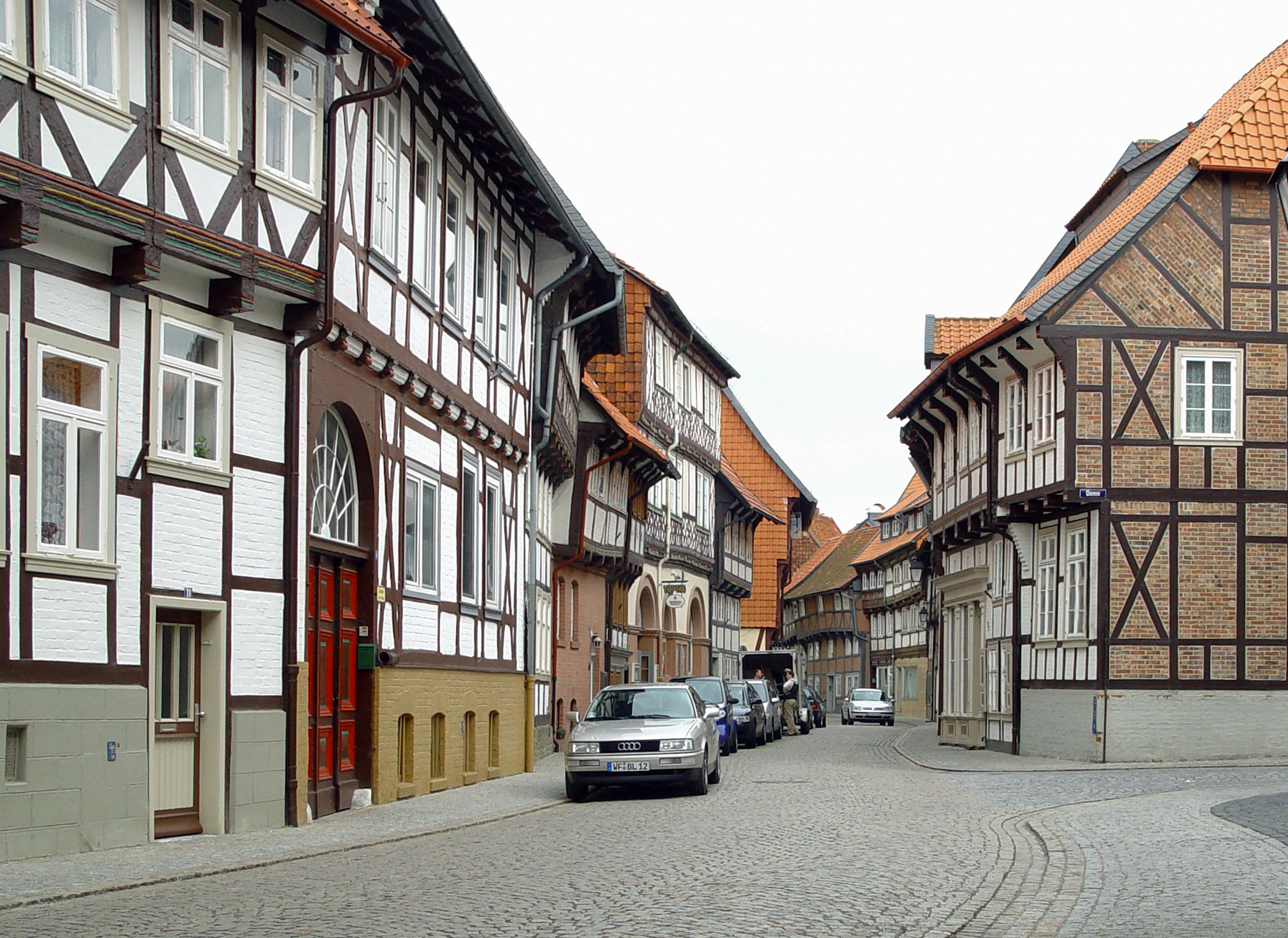
Timber-framed houses

Hornburg Castle was first mentioned in a 994 deed as a property of the Bishopric of Halberstadt. In 1005, it was the birthplace of Pope Clement II. The fortress located on a limestone plateau served to control the northern border of the bishopric and the trade routes from Halberstadt to Braunschweig and Hildesheim. It was devastated by Henry the Lion in 1179, during his conflict with the bishop, an ally of Emperor Frederick I Barbarossa, who had the castle rebuilt.

In 1528, the attached settlement was denoted as a town by the Halberstadt bishops. It received market rights in 1552. At the same time, Hornburg, thriving from the cultivation of humulus (hop) for beer brewing, was surrounded by a town wall including five gates. The ensemble of about 400 Renaissance timber-framed houses arose after a blaze in 1512 had devastated nearly all of Hornburg's buildings. The reconstruction of the town with elaborately carved Fachwerk houses was modeled after the townscape of Halberstadt. With the bishopric Hornburg turned Protestant in 1540. The parish church Beatae Mariae Virginis is considered one of the first Lutheran hall churches in the region. During the Thirty Years' War Hornburg was occupied by the Imperial field marshal Johann Tserclaes von Tilly in 1626, but conquered by Swedish troops in 1630. In 1645, the Swedish military Hans Christoff von Königsmarck finally had the castle destroyed. The current building is a reconstruction on a private initiative or Georg Lüdecke in 1927, based on an engraving by Merian from around 1650 with plans by Bodo Ebhardt.

With the secularization of the Halberstadt bishopric in 1648, Hornburg fell to the electors of Brandenburg and after the 1815 Congress of Vienna it became part of the Prussian province of Saxony. Hornburg stayed a Prussian town until 1941, when it was attached to the Free State of Brunswick in the course of the establishment of the City of Salzgitter. Therefore, at the end of World War II Hornburg found itself in British occupation zone and later became a West German town.

== Twin town ==
- Osterwieck, Germany
