= Ivanskoye =

Ivanskoye Иванское
- Settlement
- Location within Arkhangelsk Oblast Location within Russia
- Coordinates: 61°17′N 42°22′E
- Country: Russia
- Region: Arkhangelsk Oblast
- District: Velsky District
- Time zone: UTC+3:00

Ivanskoye (Russian: Иванское) is a rural locality (a settlement) in Sudromskoye Rural Settlement of Velsky District, Arkhangelsk Oblast, Russia. The population was 128 as of 2014. There is 1 street.

== Geography ==
Ivanskoye is located on the Vaga River, 35 km northeast of Velsk (the district's administrative centre) by road. Ivanovskaya is the nearest rural locality.
