= Rammelsberg =

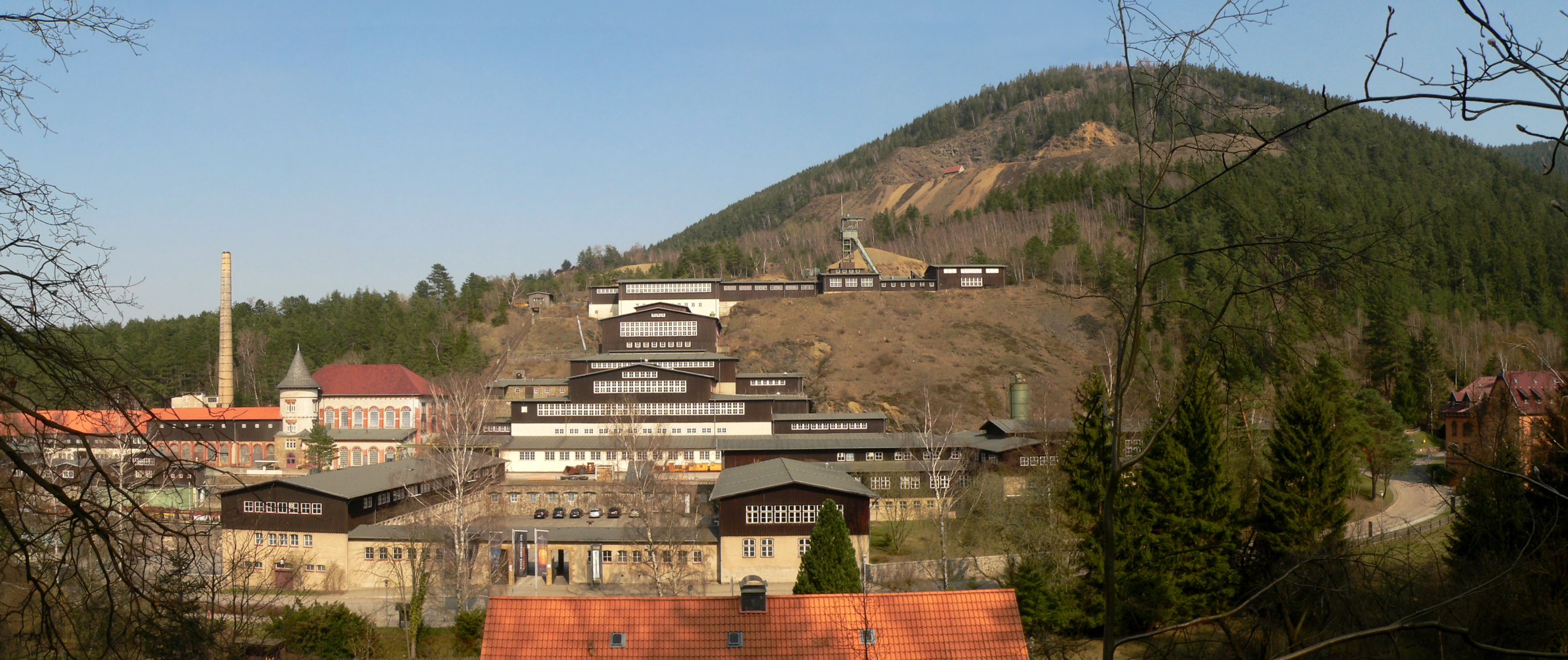
- Mining museum on the slopes of Rammelsberg

Highest point
- Elevation: 635 m (2,083 ft)
- Coordinates: 51°53′25″N 10°25′08″E

Geography
- Location within Germany Location within Lower Saxony
- Location: Lower Saxony, Germany
- Parent range: Harz Mountains
- Topo map(s)

UNESCO World Heritage Site
- Part of: Mines of Rammelsberg, Historic Town of Goslar and Upper Harz Water Management System
- Criteria: Cultural: i, ii, iii, iv
- Reference: 623-001
- Inscription: 1992 (16th Session)
- Area: 363.3 ha (898 acres)
- Buffer zone: 376.1 ha (929 acres)

The Rammelsberg (German pronunciation: [ˈʁaml̩sbɛʁk]) is a mountain, 635 metres (2,083 ft) high, on the northern edge of the Harz range, south of the historic town of Goslar in the North German state of Lower Saxony. The mountain is the location of an important silver, copper, and lead mine. When it closed in 1988, it had been the only mine still working continuously for over 1,000 years. Because of its long history of mining and testimony to the advancement and exchange of technology over many centuries, the visitor mine of Rammelsberg was inscribed as a UNESCO World Heritage Site in 1992.

== Name ==
According to legend, the mountain was named after a knight called "Ramm", who was a henchman of Emperor Otto the Great. In 968, whilst out hunting, the knight tied his horse to a tree, in order to pursue some deer through almost impassable terrain. His charger impatiently pawed the ground with its hooves whilst waiting for his master to return and so exposed a vein of silver ore. According to another explanation, the name may be derived from the widespread ramsons (Low German: Ramsen) found on the slopes. It is most probably however, that "ram" is a very old word-explanation for "ore with copper". In Italian today "rame" means "copper".

== Ore formation ==
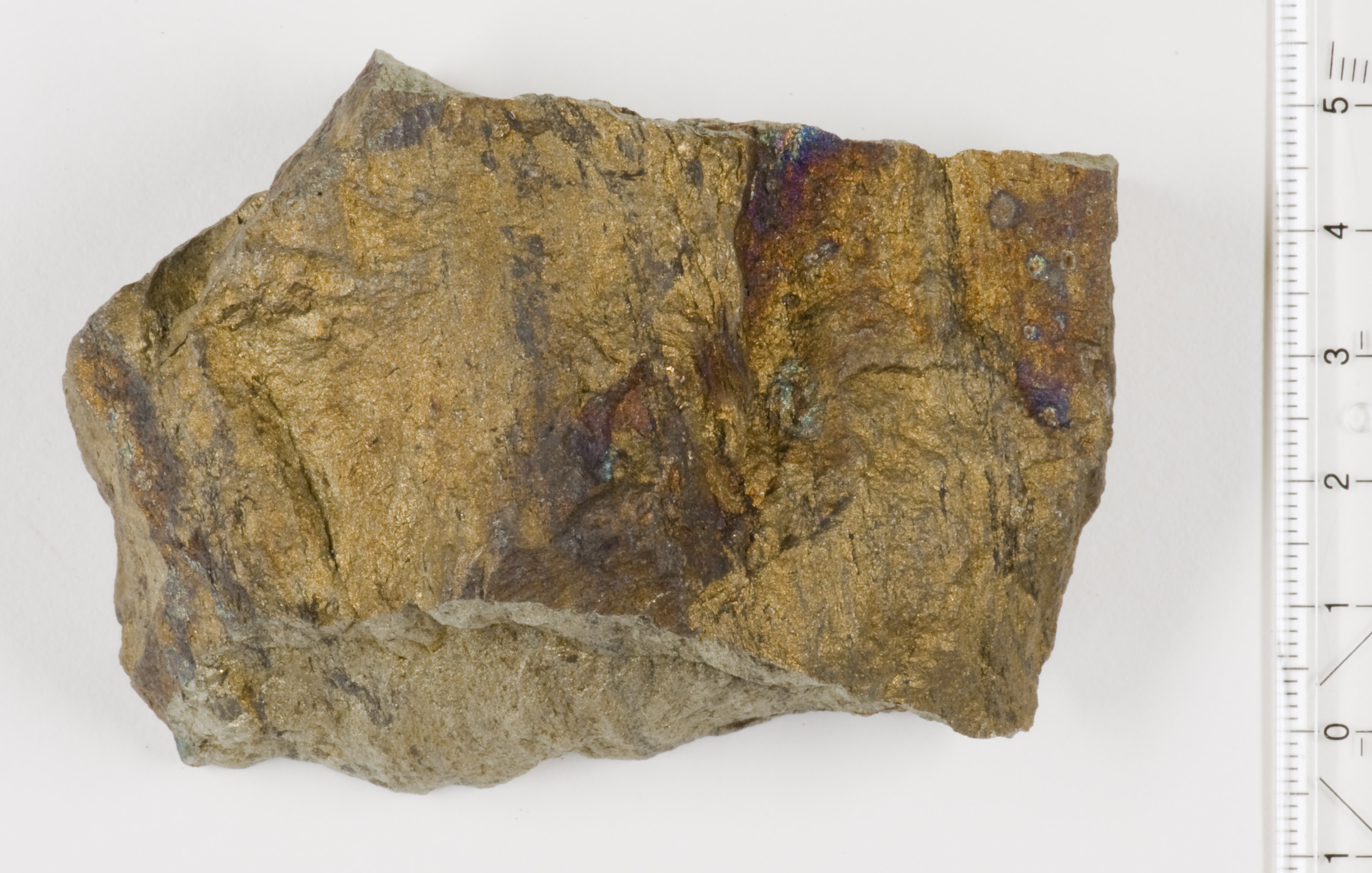
Copper ore from the sedimentary exhalative deposit at Rammelsberg

Unlike the mineral deposits of the Upper Harz, the ore deposits at the Rammelsberg were caused by the escape of hot, metal-bearing, thermal springs on the sea floor in the Devonian period. This formation is referred to as a sedimentary exhalative deposit. At the bottom of the Devonian sea, two large massive sulfide lenses formed that were later caught up in the folding of rocks during the Carboniferous period and so lie overturned at an angle in the mountain.

Ore mining started in the "Old Bed" or "Old Orebody" (Altes Lager), exposed on the surface by erosion, during the Bronze Age. The "New Bed" (Neues Lager) was only discovered in the 19th century as a result of specific exploration. The mines were exhausted only in the 1980s, and were shut down in 1988. The ore contained an average of 14% of zinc, 6% lead, 2% copper, 1 g/t gold and 140 g/t silver.

== Mining history ==
The mining history of the Rammelsberg occurred as a continuous process in different phases. Initially the main product was copper ore, then, (much) later lead, and with lead, silver.

The analysis of written sources and archaeological finds of unsmelted pieces of ore and slag found during archaeological excavations between 1981 and 1985 at Düna (near Osterode) in the South Harz indicates that the earliest mining activity at the Rammelsberg occurred in the late 7th century AD. Anglo-Saxon burial objects made of Harz ore were also excavated in England.

=== Middle Ages ===
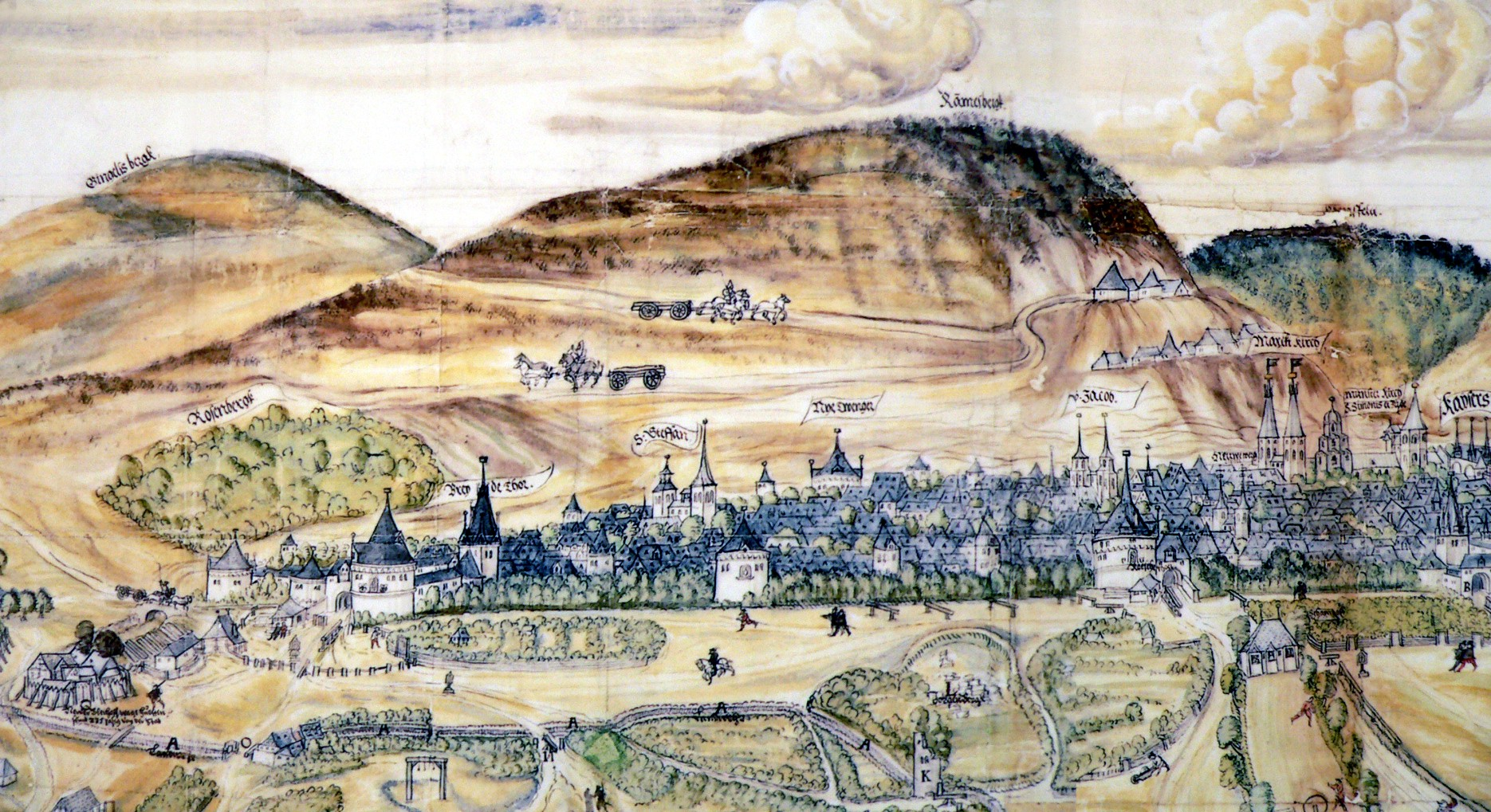
Imperial City of Goslar and Rammelsberg, 1574 depiction

Mining on the Rammelsberg was first mentioned in the records around 968 by the Saxon chronicler, Widukind of Corvey. According to his Res gestae saxonicae, Emperor Otto the Great had silver ore deposits (Latin: venas argenti) opened and extracted. The mining settlement of Goslar was not mentioned until 979. In 1005, attracted by the presence of silver, King Henry II of Germany had the Imperial Palace of Goslar (Kaiserpfalz Goslar) built at the foot of Mt. Rammelsberg, and held his first Imperial Assembly there in 1009. Extended by his Salian successors Conrad II and Henry III, the palace of Goslar gradually replaced the former Royal palace of Werla.

The profitable mines remained a Reichsgut directly belonging to the Holy Roman Emperor. When in 1175 Emperor Frederick Barbarossa called for support on his campaign against the Italian cities of the Lombard League, the Welf duke Henry the Lion demanded his enfeoffment with the Goslar mines in return, which Frederick denied. Duke Henry laid siege to the town and had the mining installations demolished. Restored after his deposition in 1180, the Rammelberg mines were again contested in 1198/99 during the Welf-Hohenstaufen throne quarrel between his son Otto IV and Frederick's son Philip of Swabia.

After Imperial influence waned, the mines were held in pledge by the council of the Imperial city of Goslar, who officially purchased the entitlement to the rights and royalties from mining (Bergregal) in 1359. A mining accident is documented in 1376, when more than 100 miners were buried and killed. The main ores mined at Rammelsberg were lead-zinc ore, copper ore, sulphur ore, mixed ore (Melierterz), brown spar (Braunerz), barite ore (Grauerz), banding ore (Banderz) and kniest along with the important minerals of galena, chalcopyrite, sphalerite, baryte and vitriols. The chief metals extracted from these ores included silver, lead, copper and zinc, on which the wealth of Goslar was based. Because of this wealth, Goslar and the Rammelsberg mines were influential in the Hanseatic League throughout the 1440s, but in 1552, control over the mine was transferred from Goslar to the Margraviate of Brandenburg

=== Modern era ===
The Goslar mines for centuries had been a thorn in the side of the Dukes of Brunswick-Wolfenbüttel ruling over the adjacent Harz estates. In 1552 – after decades of legal proceedings, feuds and skirmishing – Duke Henry V took the occasion of the city's weakened position upon the Schmalkaldic War and seized ownership of the mines from the citizens. Mining operations were further promoted by Henry's son and successor Duke Julius of Brunswick-Wolfenbüttel in 1568. During the Thirty Years' War the Goslar citizens once again tried to regain the Rammelsberg mines distinguishing themselves as loyal supporters of the Imperial forces against the Protestant commander Christian the Younger of Brunswick; however, to no avail as his nephew Duke Augustus the Younger reconciled with Emperor Ferdinand in 1642. Under the Welf dukes, gold was also won from the 18th century onwards. The smelting of Rammelsberg ore in the 18th century was described in detail by the local tithe-master Christoph Andreas Schlüter in his Gründlicher Unterricht von Hütte-Werken (1738).

With Goslar the Rammelsberg mines passed to the Kingdom of Hanover in 1814 and to the Kingdom of Prussia in 1866. Under the 1936/37 Rammelsbergprojekt, the mine was greatly expanded at the behest of the Nazi authorities as part of the Four-year plan. The Nazis saw the Rammelsberg with its metal ores as vital to their war efforts and the difficulty of mineral dressing the ore had been technically solved (using froth flotation). This led to the construction of the present-day surface installations including the hillside processing plant and Rammelsberg shaft. The architects were Fritz Schupp and Martin Kremmer, who designed other important industrial buildings (including the Zeche Zollverein in the Ruhr area, now also a UNESCO World Heritage Site).

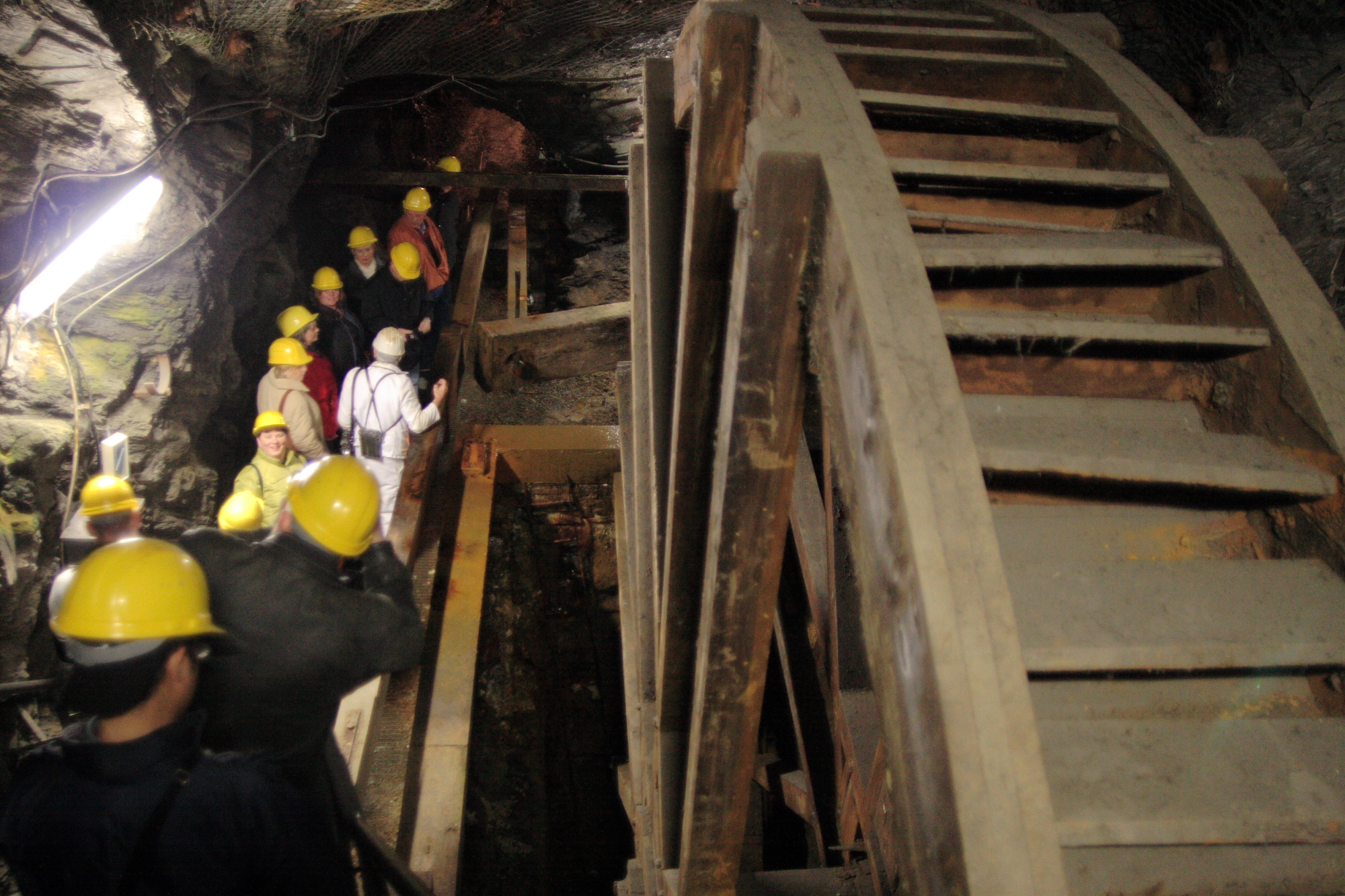
Water wheel in the mining museum

After more than 1000 years during which almost 30 million tonnes of ore were extracted, the mine was finally closed by the Preussag company on 30 June 1988 as the mineral deposits had been largely exhausted. A citizens' association argued forcefully against plans to demolish the surface installations and fill in the historic underground mine workings. Consequently, the disused mine was developed into a museum to preserve its heritage and display the history of the mine and its industrial equipment.

=== Prospecting in 2009 ===
In February 2009, the company, Scandinavian Highlands Holding A/S, published the results of geophysical investigations by its subsidiary, Harz Minerals GmbH, according to which hitherto unknown mineral deposits of the size of those at the Rammelsberg may be present, two kilometres west of the Rammelsberg ore deposits. In autumn 2009 several exploratory bores were sunk in the area of the Hessenkopf and Gosetal to a depth of 500–600 metres. At the end of January 2010, after a news blackout of several months, the company announced that they would soon be drilling to a depth of 800 metres, where they suspected there would be rich mineral deposits.

== World Heritage Site ==
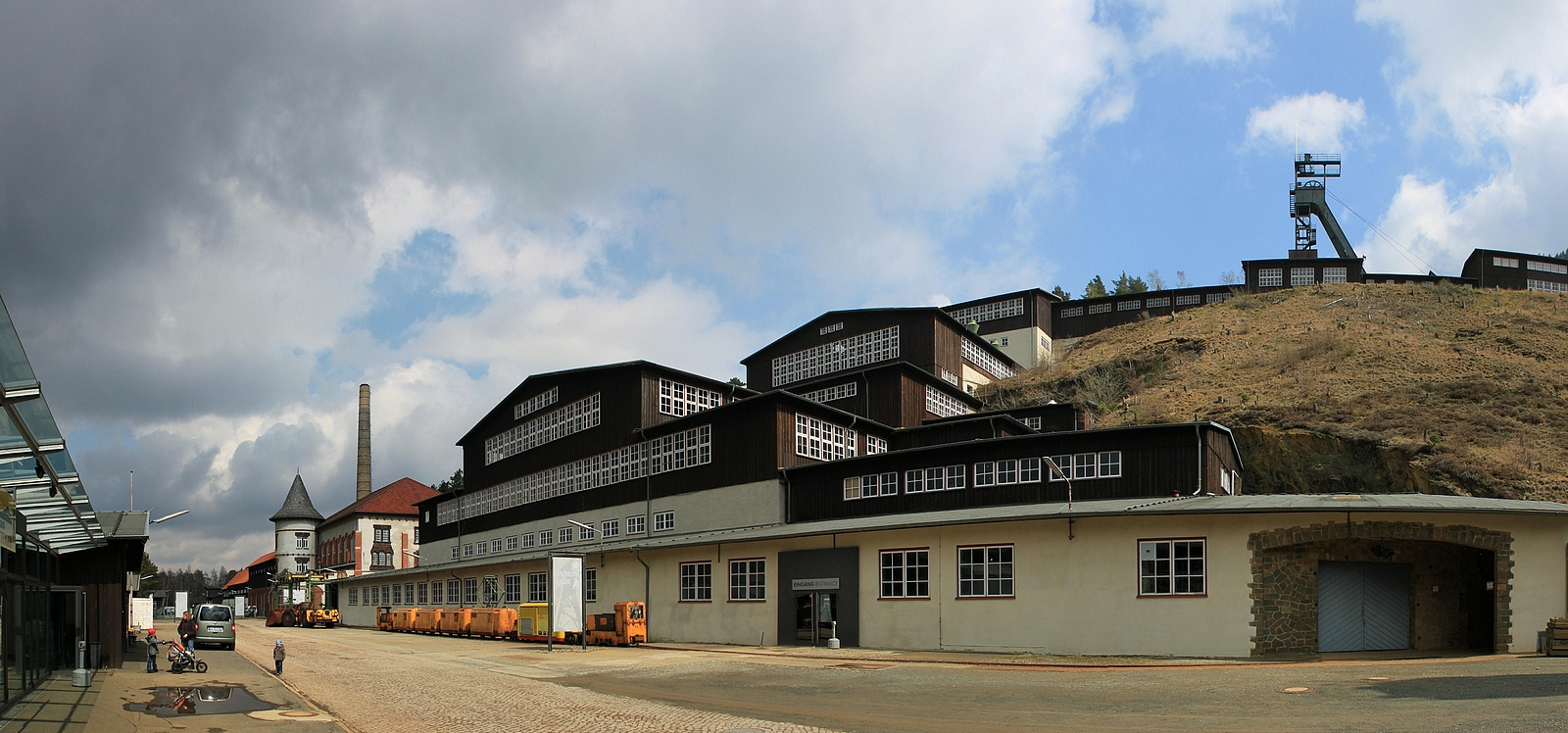

In 1992 the museum became a UNESCO World Heritage project together with Goslar's Old Town. In 2010 this World Heritage Site was expanded to include the Upper Harz Water Regale, Walkenried Abbey and the historic Samson Pit. The Rammelsberg Museum and Visitor Mine is an anchor point on the European Route of Industrial Heritage (ERIH).

The World Heritage Site protects many artifacts from the medieval era of mining operations at the mountain, including:

- old pithead dumps and slag heaps (the oldest dating from the 10th century)
- ore transportation tracks dating from the 12th century
- the Roeder Gallery (with a flatrod system and several water wheels that support the drainage of the pit and the hoisting of ore; there is a replica in the Deutsches Museum in Munich)
- the Feuergezäher Vault (the oldest "nogged" (ausgemauert) underground mining space in Central Europe)
- the Rathstiefste Gallery (medieval drainage adit; decorated with coloured vitriol encrustations)
- the headframe (18th century)
- the Master Malter's Tower (Maltermeisterturm) (oldest above-ground mining building in Germany)

== Mine installations ==
=== Master Malter's Tower ===
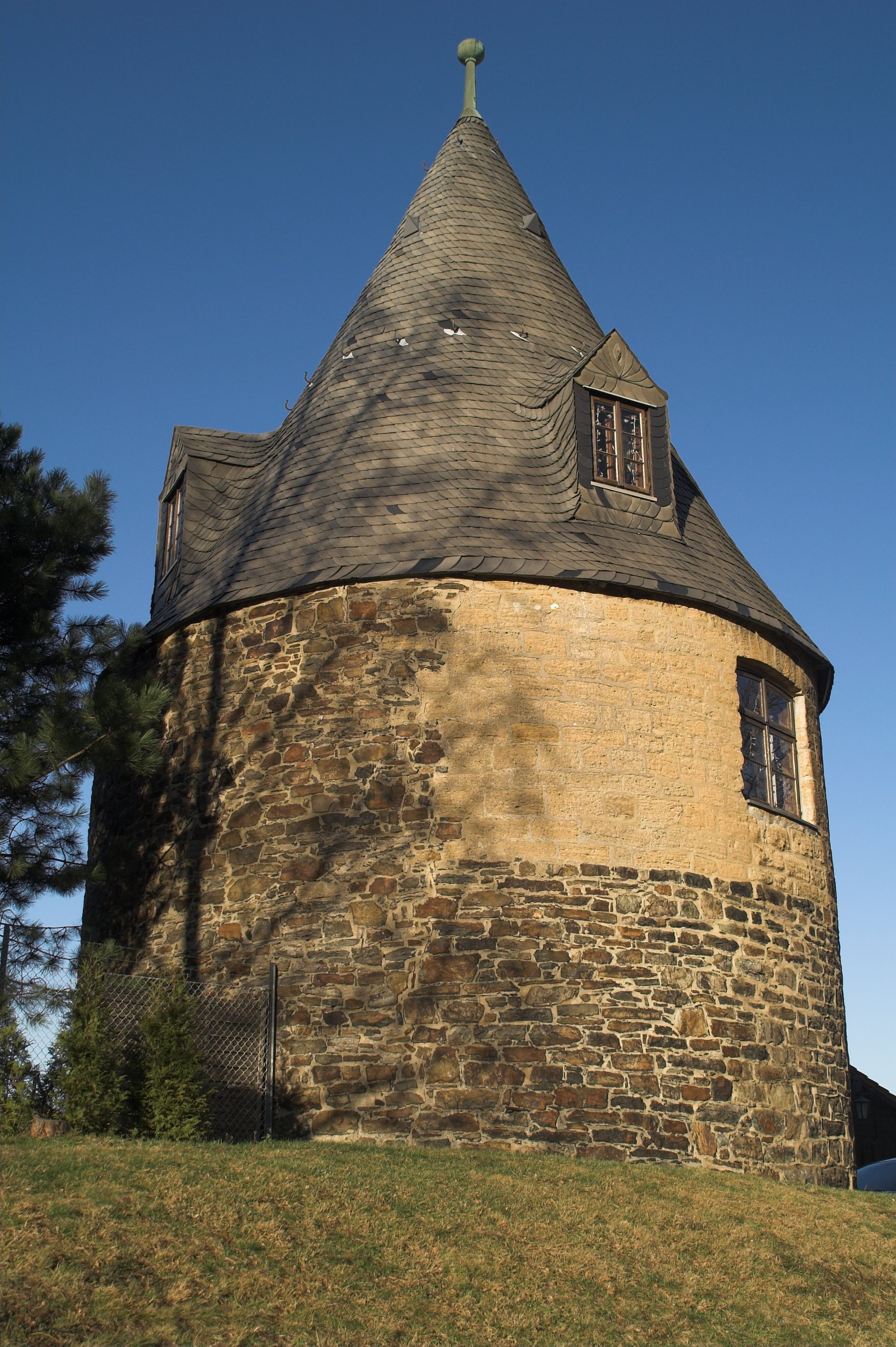
Maltermeisterturm

The Master Malter's Tower (Maltermeisterturm) is the oldest surviving above-ground mine building on the Rammelsberg and, probably, in Germany as well. It was built around 1500 on a slagheap on the side of the Rammelsberg. Initially the tower was used to oversee the pits; from 1578 it was used as a bell tower (Anläuteturm).

Since the mid-18th century the master malter (Maltermeister) lived in the tower. He managed the wood needed for the mine, which was measured in malters, hence the name.

=== Herzberg Pond ===
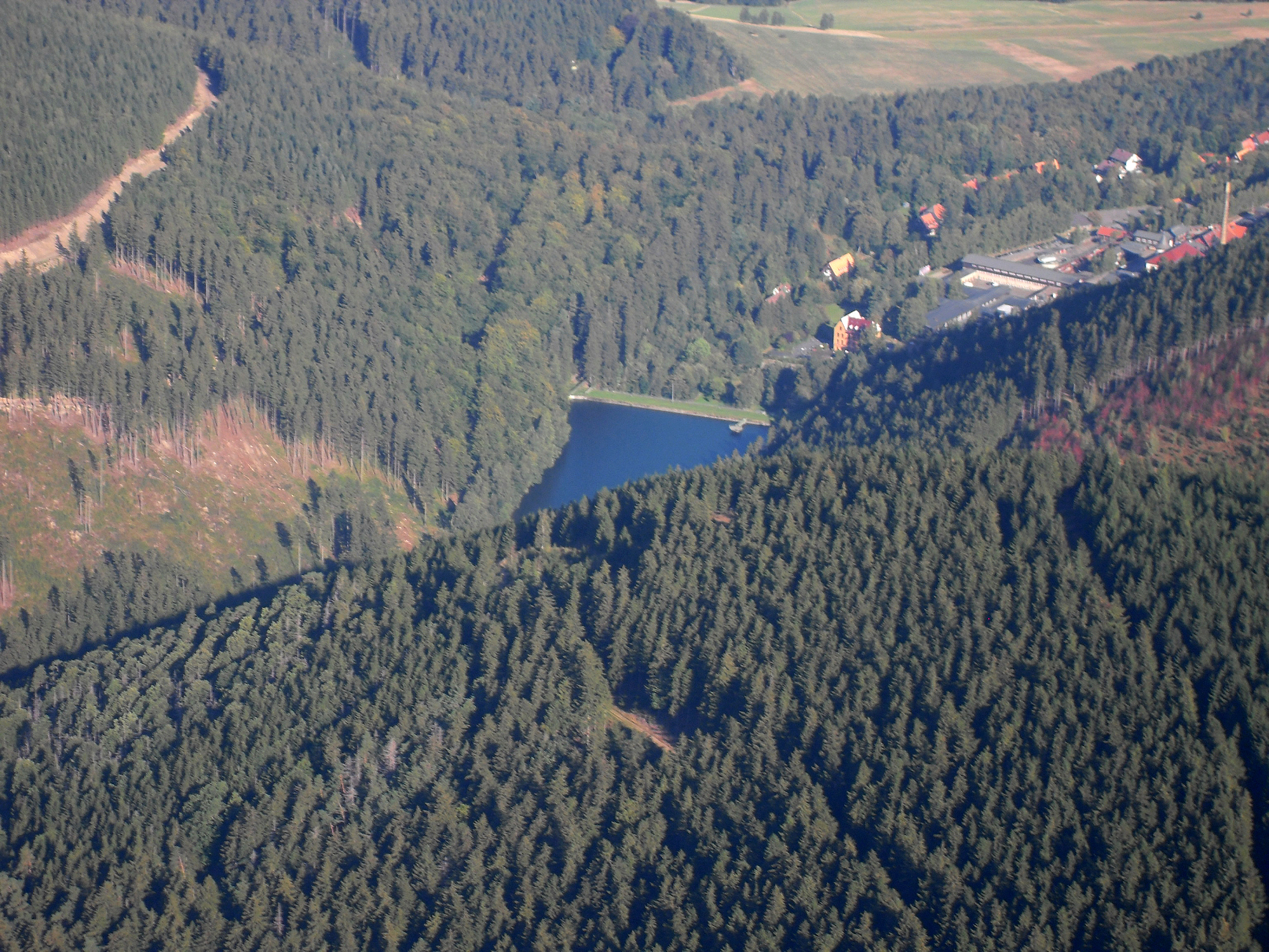
Herzberg Pond. Rear right: the ore dressing plant of the Rammelsberg

In order to have enough water to drive water wheels during times of drought the Herzberg Pond was created in 1561. Since 1926, this has been used as a woodland swimming pool. Until the closure of the mine, water was used for cooling and the warm water was pumped back into the pond where it heated the swimming basin of the woodland pool.

=== Low-grade ore dressing on the Bollrich ===
Due to the German Wirtschaftswunder ("economic miracle") after the Second World War and sharply rising lead and zinc prices in 1950, investigations were undertaken into the deposits of banding ore (Banderz). After successful trials into the processing of this low-grade ore (recoverable metal content of about 25%), the dressing of banding ore was begun in 1953 on the Bollrich above the village of Oker. Once again the mine architect, Fritz Schupp, was responsible for planning the facilities.

The site was linked to the Rammelsberg mine via the pit railway through the Gelenbeek Gallery. The removal of concentrates to the lead smelter at Oker and the Harlingerode zinc works was facilitated by a standard gauge railway line.

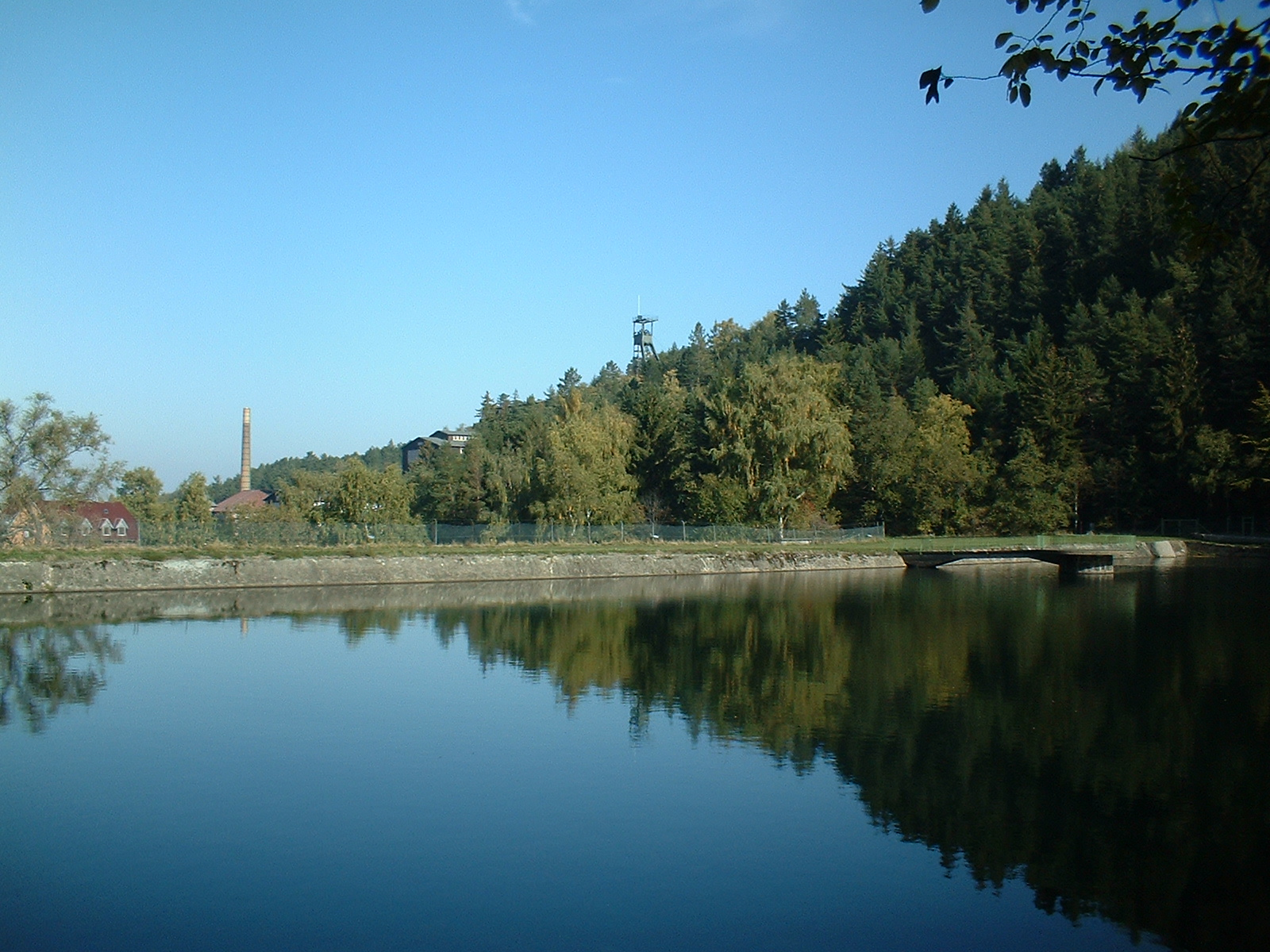
Herzberg Pond (Herzberger Teich) and Rammelsberg Shaft

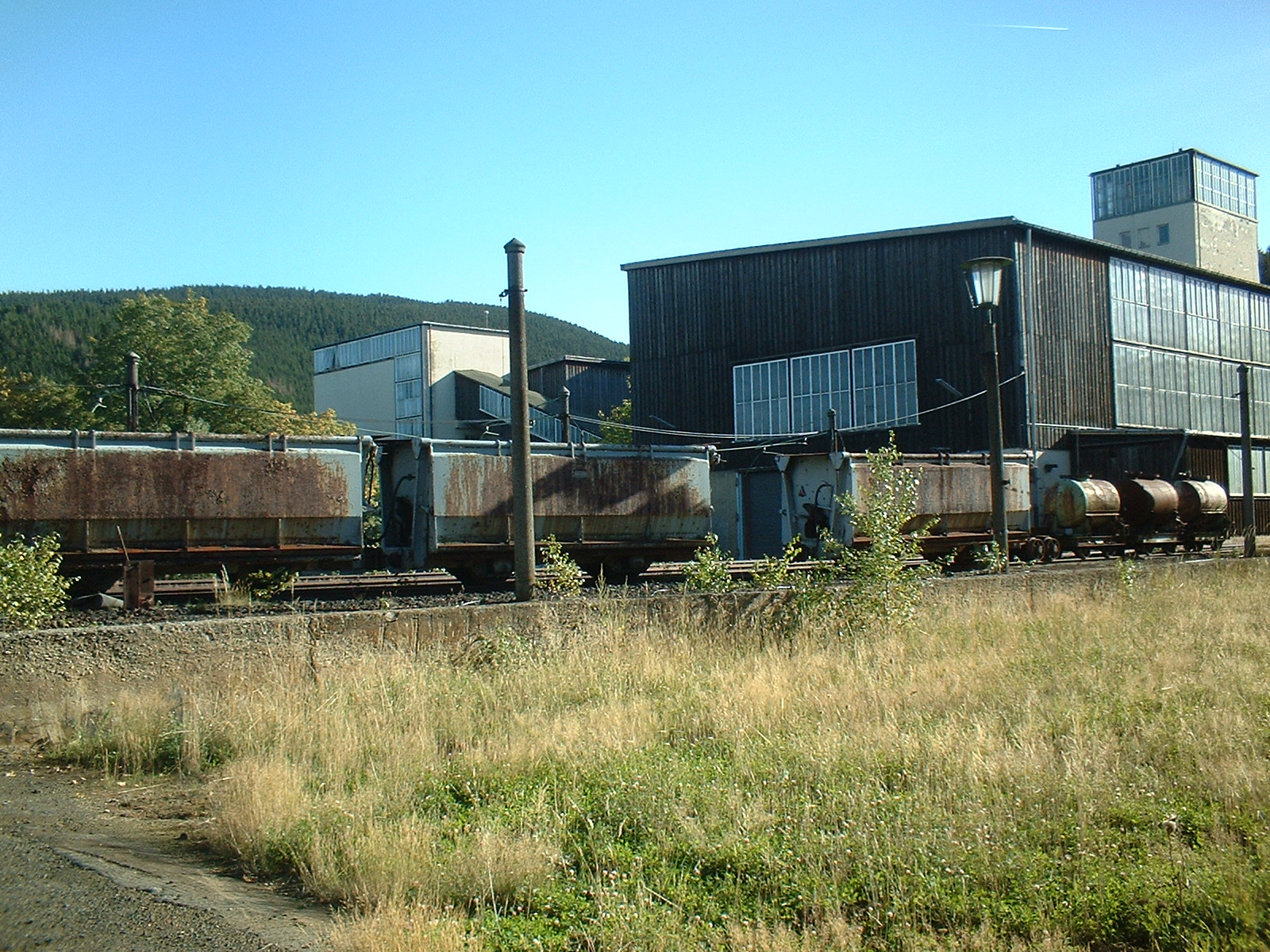
Ore dressing on the Bollrich

== Commemorative coin ==
In 2008 Goslar's "Old Town" and the Rammelsberg Mine formed the motif for the annually issued 100 Euro gold coins from the series of UNESCO World Heritage Sites.

== Harzer Wandernadel ==
The Rammelsberg Museum is No. 91 in the system of checkpoints forming the Harzer Wandernadel hiking network.

== Sources ==
Stoppel D. (2002). "Spuren des Bergbaus im Westharz". Akad. Geowiss. Hannover, Veröffentl. 20: 77–84.
