= Schladen-Werla =

- Municipality
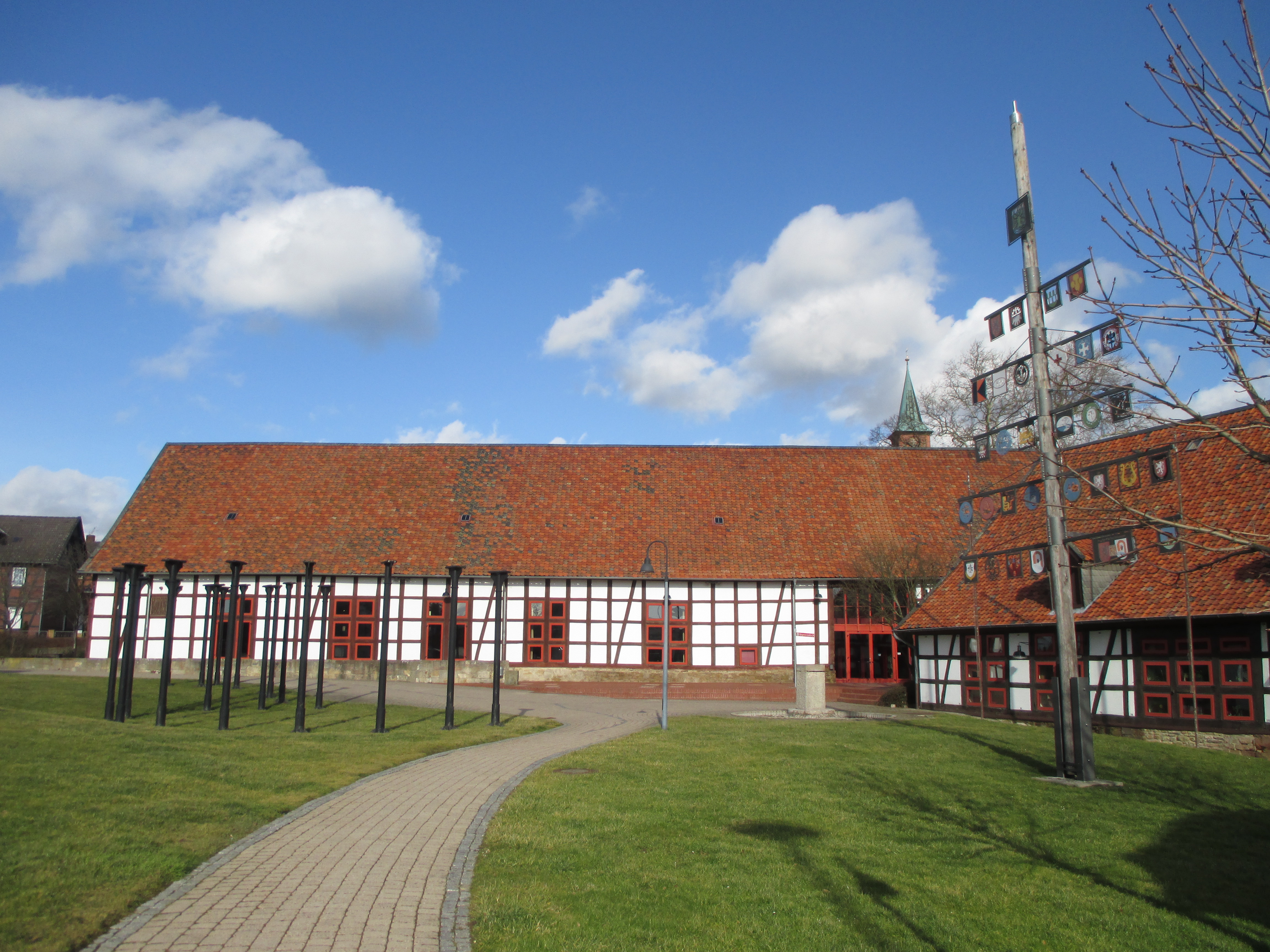
- Town hall in Schladen

- Coat of arms

- Location of Schladen-Werla within Wolfenbüttel district
- Interactive map of Schladen-Werla
- Location within Germany Location within Lower Saxony
- Coordinates: 52°02′N 10°34′E
- Country: Germany
- State: Lower Saxony
- District: Wolfenbüttel

Government
  - Mayor (2021–26): Andreas Memmert (Ind.)

Area
  - Total: 73.91 km^{2} (28.54 sq mi)
- Elevation: 97 m (318 ft)

Population (2025-12-31)
  - Total: 8,474
  - Density: 114.7/km^{2} (296.9/sq mi)
- Time zone: UTC+01:00 (CET)
  - Summer (DST): UTC+02:00 (CEST)
- Postal codes: 38315
- Dialling codes: 05334, 05335, 05339
- Vehicle registration: WF
- Website: www.schladen-werla.de

Schladen-Werla (German pronunciation: [ˈʃlaːdn̩ ˈvɛʁla]) is a municipality in the district of Wolfenbüttel, in Lower Saxony, Germany. It was formed on 1 November 2013, when the municipalities of the former Samtgemeinde ("collective municipality") Schladen: Gielde, the town of Hornburg, Schladen proper, and Werlaburgdorf were merged.

== Geography ==
The municipal area is located in the northern foothills of the Harz mountain range, stretching along the Oker river. It borders on the Lower Saxon district of Goslar in the southwest and on the state of Saxony-Anhalt (at the former inner German border) in the southeast.

The Schladen-Werla municipality comprises the localities of Beuchte, Gielde, Hornburg, Isingerode, Schladen, Wehre, and Werlaburgdorf. The administrative seat is at Schladen.

== Politics ==
Seats in the municipal assembly (Gemeinderat) as of 2016 local elections:

- Social Democratic Party of Germany (SPD): 12
- Christian Democratic Union of Germany (CDU): 7
- Alliance 90/The Greens: 2
- Free Voters: 1

== Transport ==
Schladen station is a stop on the Brunswick–Bad Harzburg railway line, served by regional trains. The municipality has access to the Bundesautobahn 395 motorway from Brunswick to Goslar-Vienenburg at the Schladen-Nord and Schladen-Süd junctions.

== See also ==
- Royal palace of Werla
