= Schladen =

- Ortsteil of Schladen-Werla
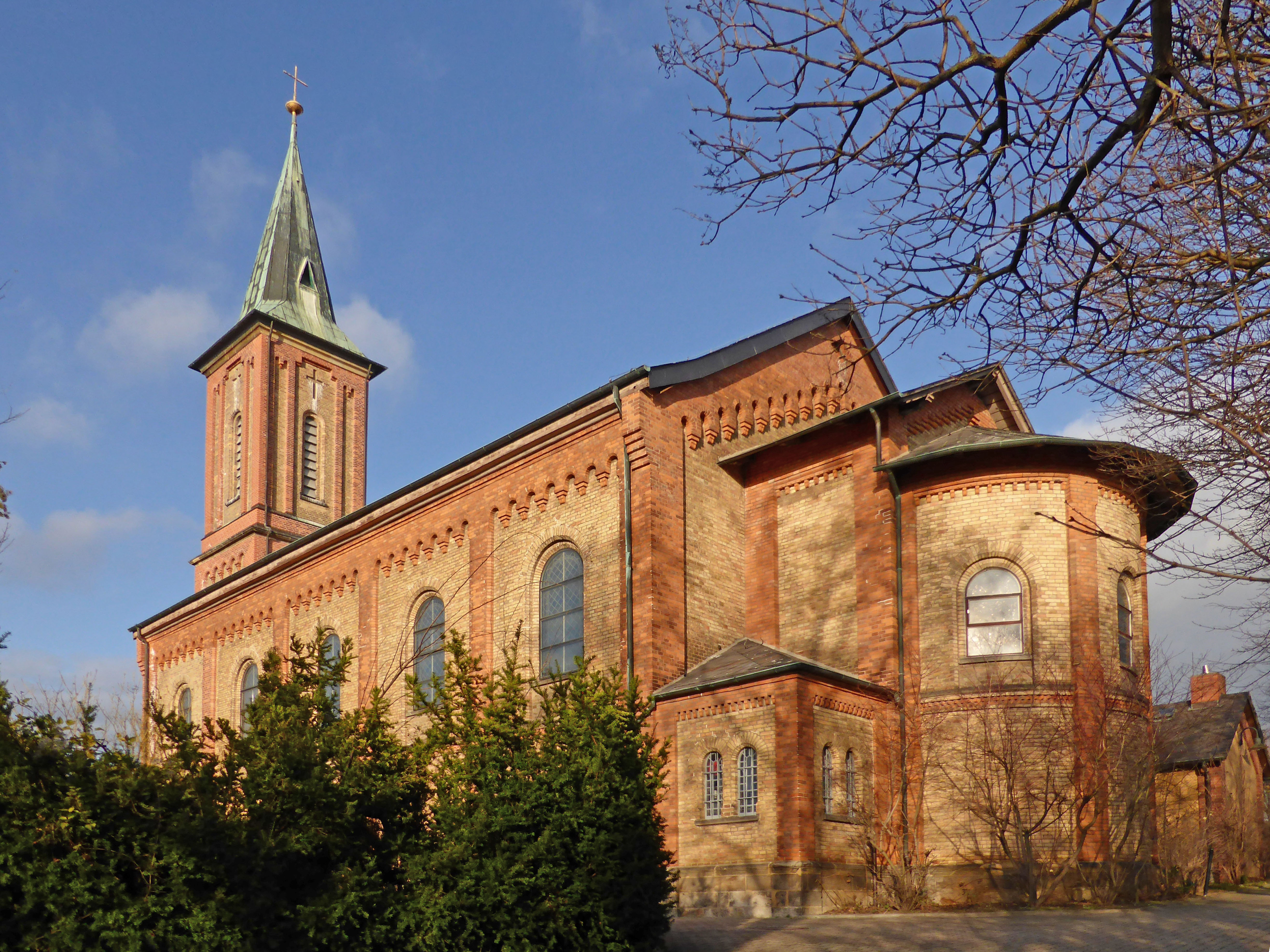
- Church of the Immaculate Conception of the Virgin Mary

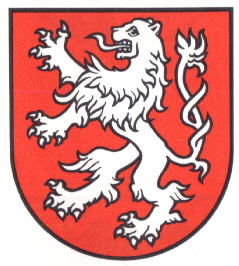
- Coat of arms
- Interactive map of Schladen
- Location within Germany Location within Lower Saxony
- Coordinates: 52°01′N 10°32′E
- Country: Germany
- State: Lower Saxony
- District: Wolfenbüttel
- Municipality: Schladen-Werla

Area
  - Total: 30.66 km^{2} (11.84 sq mi)
- Elevation: 97 m (318 ft)

Population (2012-12-31)
  - Total: 5,041
  - Density: 164.4/km^{2} (425.8/sq mi)
- Time zone: UTC+01:00 (CET)
  - Summer (DST): UTC+02:00 (CEST)
- Postal codes: 38315
- Dialling codes: 05335
- Vehicle registration: WF
- Website: www.schladen.de

Schladen (German pronunciation: [ˈʃlaːdn̩]) is a village and a former municipality in the district of Wolfenbüttel, in Lower Saxony, Germany. Since 1 November 2013, it is part of the municipality Schladen-Werla. It is situated on the river Oker, approx. 15 km south of Wolfenbüttel, and 25 km south of Braunschweig.

Schladen was the seat of the former Samtgemeinde ("collective municipality") Schladen. The German neoclassicist architect, painter and writer Leo von Klenze was born in Schladen on February 29, 1784.
