= Salzgitter Hills =

German mountain range

Coordinates: 52°3′N 10°22′E

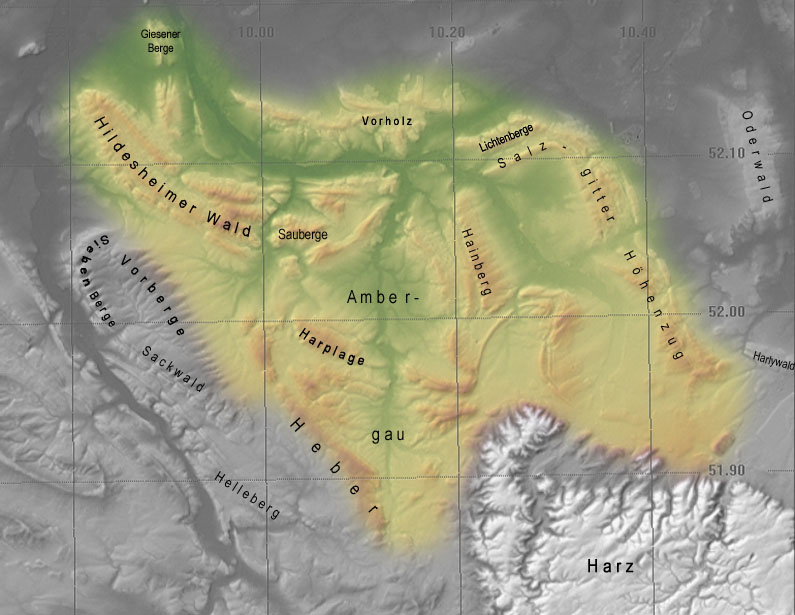
The Salzgitter Hills (above right) form a ridge bounding the northeast and east of the Innerste Uplands.

The Salzgitter Hills (German: Salzgitter-Höhenzug, also Salzgitterscher Höhenzug) is an area of upland up to 322.9 metres (1,059 ft) in height, in the Lower Saxon Hills between Salzgitter and Goslar in the districts of Wolfenbüttel and Goslar and in the territory of the independent town of Salzgitter. The hills lie in the German federal state of Lower Saxony.

The German name of Salzgitter-Höhenzug is a term used in the northern Harz Foreland, albeit not found on maps, and is used to mean the string of hills north of the Harz Mountains between the towns mentioned above.

The state forest of the Salzgitter Hills is managed by several Lower Saxony forestry offices, including the Revierförsterei Salder in Salzgitter-Salder.

The Salzgitter Hills can be divided into these four unnamed sections:

- Northwest section (mainly comprising the Lichtenberge)
  (up to 254.2 m high; between Holle and Salzgitter-Gebhardshagen)
- North-central section
  (up to 275.3 m high; between Salzgitter-Gebhardshagen and Salzgitter-Bad)
- South-central section
  (up to 307.0 m high; between Salzgitter-Bad and Liebenburg)
- Southern section
  (up to 322.9 m high; between Liebenburg and Goslar-Immenrode and Goslar-Hahndorf)

== Hills ==
The hills of the Salzgitter range include (in order of height in m above NN):

=== Northwest section ===
Lichtenberge:

- Adlershorst (254.2 m)
- Burgberg (241.1 m) – with the ruins of Lichtenberg Castle
- Herzberg (237 m)
- Langer Berg (230.4 m)
- Kalkrosenberg (220 m)
- Lindenberg (219.2 m)
- Friesenberg (217 m)
- Steinkuhlenberge (200.9 m and 195.1 m)
- Bockernberg (190 m)

South of the Lichtenberge and also in the northwest section is a ridge that is separated from them by the valley of the Oelber Bach, in which the village of Oelber on white hills and the settlement of Altenhagen lies. It consists of the following:

- Sieben Köpfe (243 m; bei Gustedt; eastern part)
- Gustedter Berg (ca. 230 m; central part)
- Elber Berg (225 m; western part)

=== North-central section ===
- Hamberg (275.3 m) – with the Bismarck Tower
- Dahlenberg (263.8 m; west of Haus Harbeck)
- Knickeln Berg (263.6 m; south of Dahlenberg)
- Schellenberg (259.9 m; north of Haus Harbeck)
- Königsberg (241.9 m; near Calbecht)
- Großer Vorberg (ca. 235 m)
- Kleiner Vorberg (228.1 m)
- Vorberg (226.0 m)
- Heinemannshöhe (222.2 m)
- Friesenberg (217 m)
- Schneidlersberg (198.0 m and 192.3 m; east of the L472)
- Fuchsberg (192.3 m; east of the L472)

=== South-central section ===
- Sieben Köpfe (near Othfresen; their highest is):
  - Bärenkopf (307.0 m) – with the ruins of an observation tower
- Döhrenberg (ca. 240 m)
- Rohenberg (ca. 240 m)
- Lewer Berg (227.0 m)
- Kassebusch (204.2 m)

=== Southern section ===
- Vier Berge (322.9 m)
- Fischerköpfe (309.1 m)
- Querberg (303.4 m)
- Königsberg (293.9 m; near Weddingen)
- Meseburg (291.0 m)
- Barley (288.4 m)
- Langenberg (287.3 m)
- Glockenberg (284.4 m)
- Schneeberg (282.6 m)
- Försterberg (279.2 m)
- Frankenberg (269.2 m)
- Grotenberg (256.1 m)

== Bodies of water ==
=== Streams and rivers ===
The streams and rivers in and on the Salzgitter Hills include the:

- Fuhse – passes to the east of the northern central and northwestern sections
- Hengstebach – rises west of the northern central section in der municipality of Elbe; eastern tributary of the Innerste
- Innerste – passes the hills to the west
- Oker – passes east of the southern section
- Warne – rises on the transition from the northern to the southern central section near Salzgitter-Bad; western tributary of the Oker

=== Lakes ===
The lakes in and around the Salzgitter Hills include the:

- Reihersee – in the north of the northern central section; south of Salzgitter-Gebhardshagen
- Fortunateich – in the north of the southern section; east of Liebenburg-Heißum
- Morgensternteich – in the south of the southern section; northeast of Goslar-Hahndorf

== Settlements ==
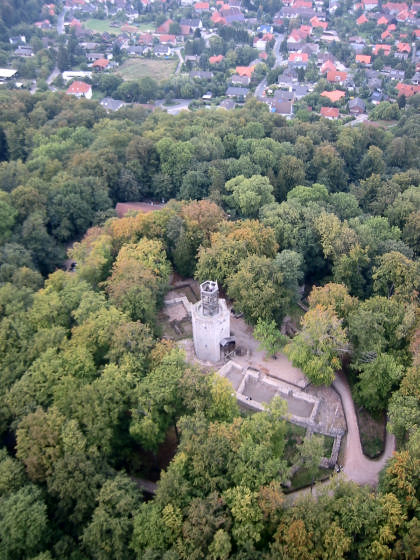
Ruins of Lichtenberg Castle from the south, with the village of Lichtenberg in the background

Amongst the (generally larger) villages and towns in and around the Salzgitter Hills (from northwest to southeast) are:

- Holle – a few kilometres west of the western end of the northwest section (Landkreis Hildesheim)
- Baddeckenstedt – southwest of northwest section (Landkreis Wolfenbüttel)
  - Wartjenstedt – west of the western end of the northwest section
  - Burgdorf (municipality of Baddeckenstedt) – northwest of the northwest section
  - Elbe (municipality of Baddeckenstedt) – south of the northwest section
  - Haverlah (municipality of Baddeckenstedt) – southwest of northern central section
- Salzgitter – in the northern parts of the northwest section and the northern central section (kreisfreie Stadt)
  - Osterlinde – north of the northwest section
  - Lichtenberg – north of the northwest section
  - Gebhardshagen – on the transition of the northwestern section to the northern central section
  - Bad – on the transition from the northern to the southern central section
  - Ringelheim – west of the transition from the northern to the southern central section
- Liebenburg – on the transition from the northern to the southern central section (Landkreis Goslar)
  - Dörnten – west of the southern section
  - Groß Döhren – east of the southern section
  - Othfresen – south of the southern central section
- Vienenburg – a few kilometres east of the southern section (Landkreis Goslar)
  - Immenrode (western village of Vienenburg) – southeast of the southern section
  - Weddingen – southeast of the southern section
- Goslar – south of the extreme southern end of the southern section (Landkreis Goslar)
  - Hahndorf (northern village of Goslar) – south of the southern section
  - Jerstedt (northwestern village of Goslar) – southwest of southern section

== Sources ==
- Bundesanstalt für Landeskunde and Raumforschung: Geographische Landesaufnahme 1:200000. Naturräumliche Gliederung Deutschlands. Die naturräumlichen Einheiten auf Blatt 86 Hannover. Bad Godesberg 1960
