= Woldenberg =

Woldenberg may refer to:

== Geography ==
- German name of Dobiegniew, a town in western Poland
- Woldenberg Park, a park in New Orleans, Louisiana

== People ==
- Lords (Counts) of Woldenberg ("Von Wolhdenberg")
- José Woldenberg Karakowski (born 1952, Monterrey, Nuevo León), Mexican sociologist
- Malcolm Woldenberg (1896-1982), Canadian-born American businessman and philanthropist
- The Goldring/Woldenberg Institute of Southern Jewish Life

== See also ==
- Wohldenberg
- Waldenberg, Waldenberger
