= Harliburg =

Former imperial castle in Lower Saxony, Germany

- Harlyburg, Herlingsberg
- Vienenburg, Landkreis Goslar
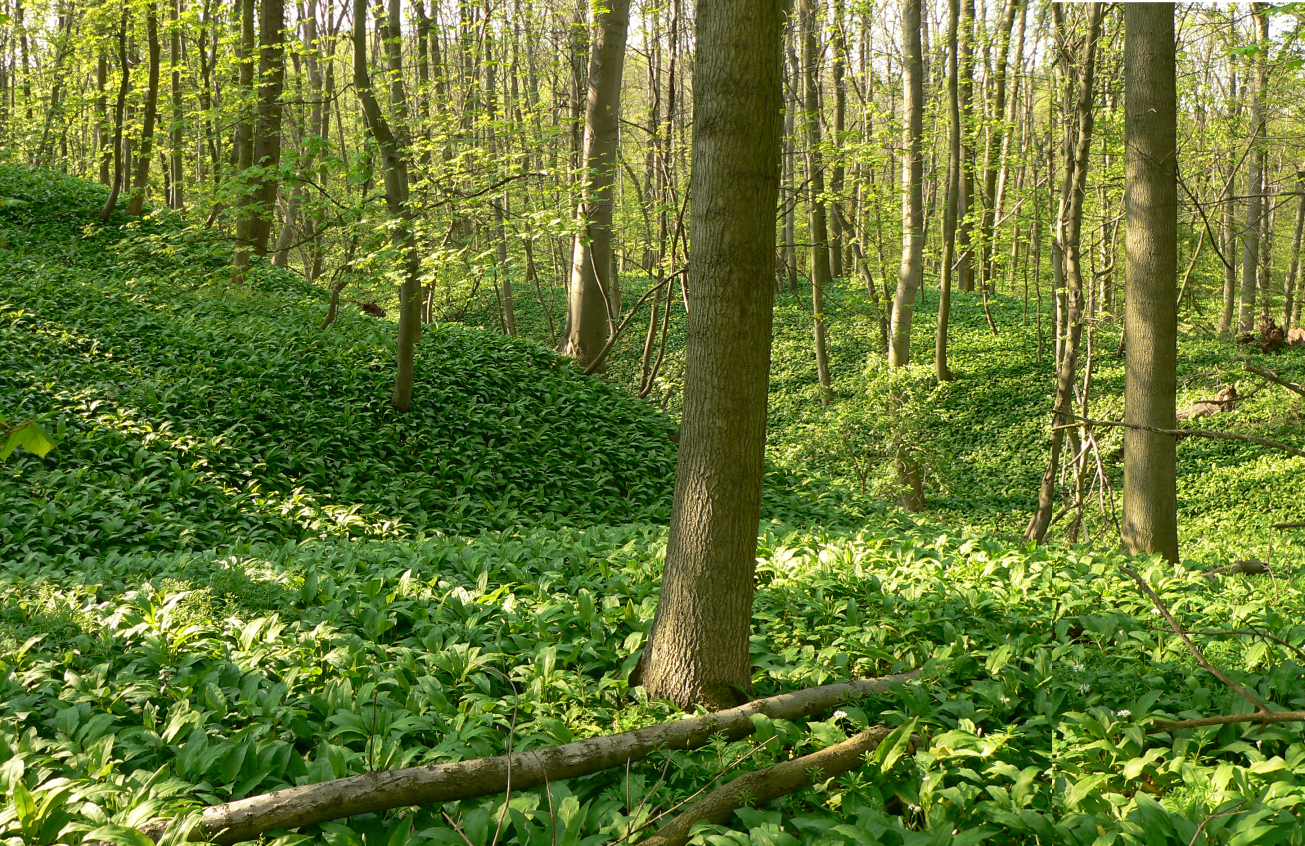
- Castle moats

Site information
- Type: Hill castle, hillside castle
- Code: DE-NI
- Condition: ruins, ramparts, moats

Location
- Coordinates: 51°57′36″N 10°34′19″E
- Height: 193 m above sea level (NN)

Site history
- Built: 13th century

The Harliburg (also Harlyburg or Herlingsberg) is a former imperial castle (Reichsburg) in the Harly Forest, in southeast Lower Saxony, Germany.

== Location ==
The location of the former hillside castle (193 m above sea level (NN)) is about 1 km (as the crow flies) north-northeast of the town of Vienenburg (141 m above NN), in the county of Goslar and around 10 km (as the crow flies) northeast of the town of Goslar. The River Oker flows below the castle site to the south and east, around the southeastern end of the Harly Forest.

A few hundred metres southwest of the Harliburg, in the Oker valley, lies Lake Vienenburg (Vienenburger See). Almost exactly 2 km west-northwest is the hill of Harlyberg (255.9 m above NN), the highest point of the Harly Forest. A section of the A 395 motorway runs past the Harly Forest, a few hundred metres east of the old Harliburg, where it is crossed by the B 241 federal road.

== History ==
The Harliburg was built in 1203 by King Otto IV as an imperial stronghold. Like the Liebenburg, that stood around 10 km to the northwest, it was intended to threaten the access roads to Goslar, which were held by the Hohenstaufen lord, Philip of Swabia. In 1218, Otto himself stayed at the castle shortly before his death.

In the late 13th century, the castle was transferred to the House of Welf. At the Diet of Erfurt in 1290, the Bishop of Hildesheim accused Henry the Admirable of Brunswick-Grubenhagen of breaking the Landfriede or "imperial peace" that had been in force since 12834, by tolerating highway robbery by the soldiers garrisoning the castle. As a result, the Herlingsberg War was precipitated, during which, in 1291, the Bishop of Hildesheim captured the Harliburg after a four-month siege, and had it slighted. Its stone was used inter alia to build the water castle of Wiedelah between 1292 and 1297, some 2 km southeast. The stone was also used in the construction of the nearby castle of Vienenburg in the town of the same name in 1300.

Today the site of the former Harliburg is covered by dense forest, only the circular ramparts and moats remaining.

== In literature ==
The contemporary poet, Heinrich Rosla, from Nienburg published the Latin epic poem, Herlingsberga about the Harliburg.

== Bibliography ==
- Ernst Andreas Friedrich: Die Wälle der Harliburg, pp. 137-139, in: Wenn Steine reden könnten. Vol. IV, Landbuch-Verlag, Hanover, 1998, ISBN 3-7842-0558-5
