= Siegfried II =

Siegfried II may refer to:

- Siegfried II, Count of Stade (d. 1037)
- Siegfried II (archbishop of Mainz) (d. 1230)
- Siegfried II of Westerburg (d. 1297), archbishop of Cologne
- Siegfried II of Querfurt (d. 1310), bishop of Hildesheim
