= Harly Forest =

Hill range in Lower Saxony, Germany

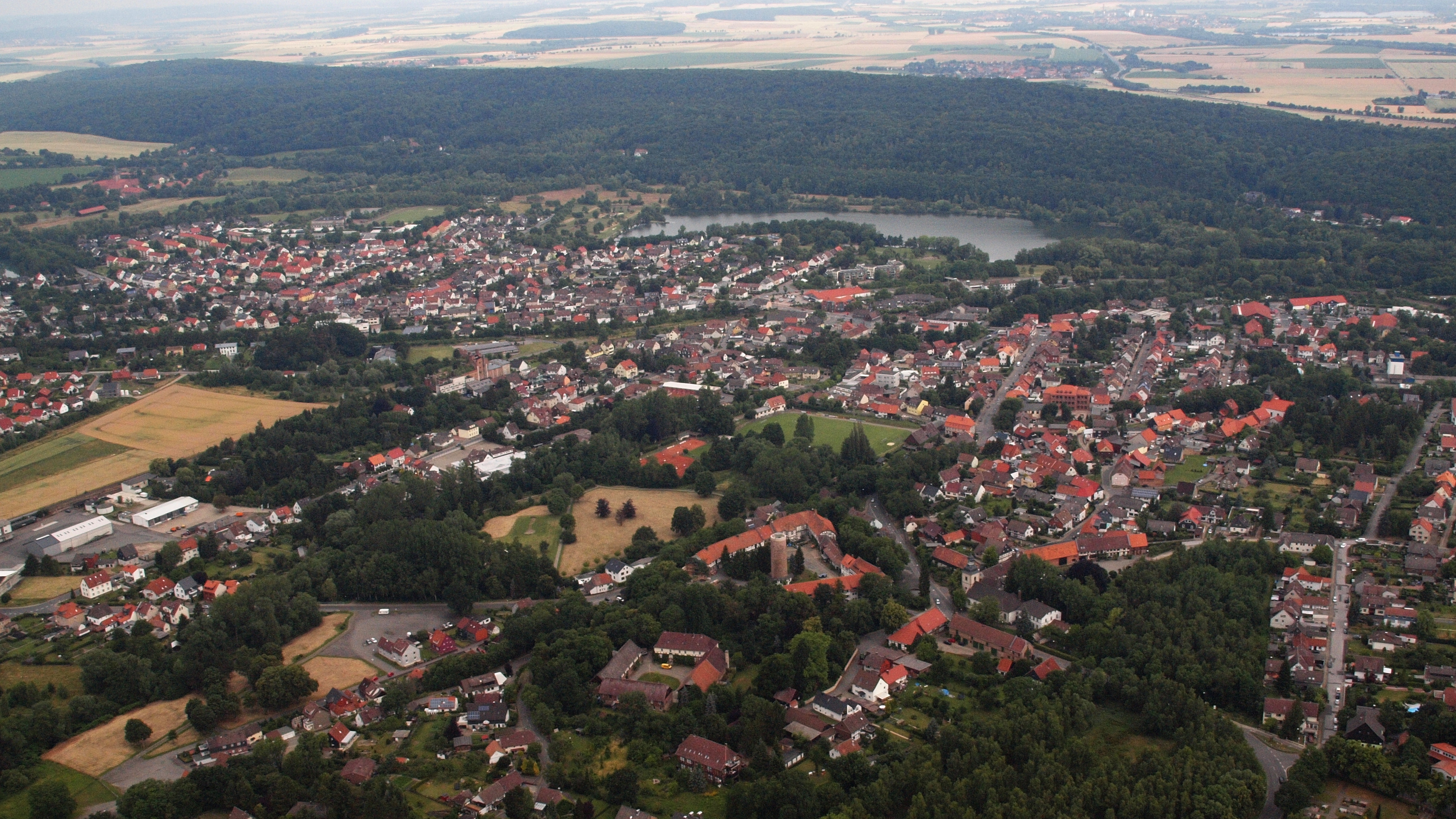
- View over Vienenburg and Harly Forest

Highest point
- Peak: Harlyberg
- Elevation: 255.9 m (840 ft)
- Coordinates: 51°58′2″N 10°32′37″E

Geography
- Country: Germany
- State: Lower Saxony

The Harly Forest (German: Harly-Wald, also Harlywald or just Harly) is a hill range up to 256 m (840 ft) above NN in the district of Goslar in southeastern Lower Saxony, Germany.

== Geography ==
The low ridge is situated in the northern foothills of the Harz mountain range, stretching southeast of the Innerste Uplands from the Salzgitter Hills to the Oker river. It is located about 11 kilometres (6.8 mi)—as the crow flies—northeast of Goslar and immediately north-northwest of the municipality of Vienenburg, surrounded by the villages of Weddingen, Lengde and Beuchte (all part of the Schladen-Werla municipality). The range is about 6 km (3.7 mi) long by 1 km (0.62 mi) wide and its eastern edge overlooks the Oker valley. It may be reached via the A 395 motorway from Brunswick, the B 241 and B 82 highways, as well as by several side roads and tracks branching off those roads.

The highest hill in the Harly Forest is the Harlyberg, roughly 256 metres high, atop which an observation tower, the Harly Tower (Harlyturm), stands.

== Geology and Ecology ==
The Harly is a tectonic salt formation. In the technical language of geologists the Harly Forest is classed as a "Geological Anticline" (Geologischer Schmalsattel). Ecologically the Harly Forest is a near-natural hillside forest (naturnaher Hangwald) on warm-dry chalk and silicate habitats.

== Harly Castle ==
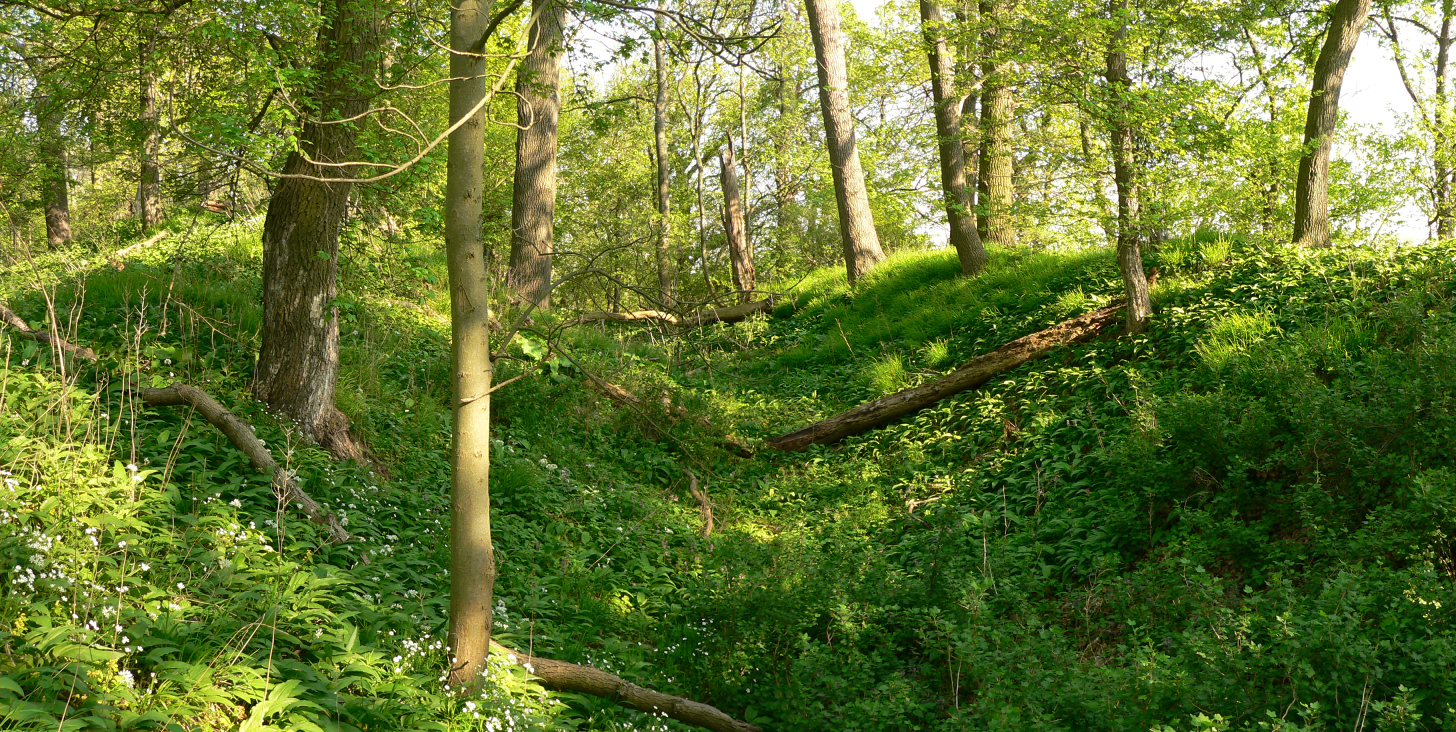
Moats of Harly Castle

The southeastern edge of the ridge lies immediately above the Oker Valley and from 1203 was the construction site of an Imperial castle, built during the German throne quarrel between the Welf and Hohenstaufen dynasties. It was erected at the behest of by the Welf king Otto of Brunswick to control the trade route to the Imperial City of Goslar, whose citizens had allied with his rival Philip of Swabia. After Philip's assassination, Otto, crowned Holy Roman Emperor in 1209, stayed at the fortress several times.

Upon Otto's death at the nearby Harzburg in 1218, Harly Castle passed to his Welf heirs. At the 1290 Imperial diet in Erfurt, the Hildesheim prince-bishop Siegfried II of Querfurt accused Duke Henry I of Brunswick of using its favourable location for ambushes and highway robberies of bypassing merchants. He had the castle besieged for several months and eventually completely slighted.

== Potash works ==
A vestige of former mining activity in the area is the historic Vienenburg potash works and fertilizer plant with its old shafts: numbers I, II and III. In operation from the 1880s, the mine was closed after a massive brine inrush in 1930. The former Cistercian monastery of Wöltingerode, located on the southern perimeter of the ridge west of Vienenburg, and its abbey distillery are also worth seeing.
