= Gera Demands =

1980 East German policy

The Gera Demands (German: Geraer Forderungen) were a set of demands made by the East German leader Erich Honecker on 13 October 1980. These demands were directed at the West German government and called for far-reaching foreign policy concessions.

In a speech at a party conference in Gera, his demands entailed four stipulations: that West Germany recognise the existence of East German citizenship, that the Central Registry of State Judicial Administrations be defunded, that the two German states establish official diplomatic relations, and that West Germany recognise the middle of the Elbe river as its eastern border.

The Gera Demands followed a period of rapprochement between East and West Germany. However, they were met with scepticism by the West German public, and none of Honecker's demands were heeded by the government of Helmut Schmidt. According to the historian Ulrich Mählert, this initiative aimed to reassure the Soviet Union of continued East German support amidst the recent flare-up of the Cold War.

== Background ==
Relations between East and West Germany deteriorated in the late 1970s after a period of detente fostered by the Neue Ostpolitik initiative of West German chancellor Willy Brandt. This downturn was influenced by the New Cold War surrounding the Soviet–Afghan War and the rising tensions within the Eastern Bloc, exemplified by the Solidarity movement in Poland. During this time, the West German government of Helmut Schmidt avoided far-reaching aims in its dealings with the German Democratic Republic (GDR), seeking to strengthen economic and political ties to maintain the fading sense of connectedness between the populations of both states. For the East German SED government, this situation became difficult to navigate: even though the GDR's economy had become increasingly dependent on trade with its neighbour, the party still sought to make clear its ideological differences from the West.

== Content ==
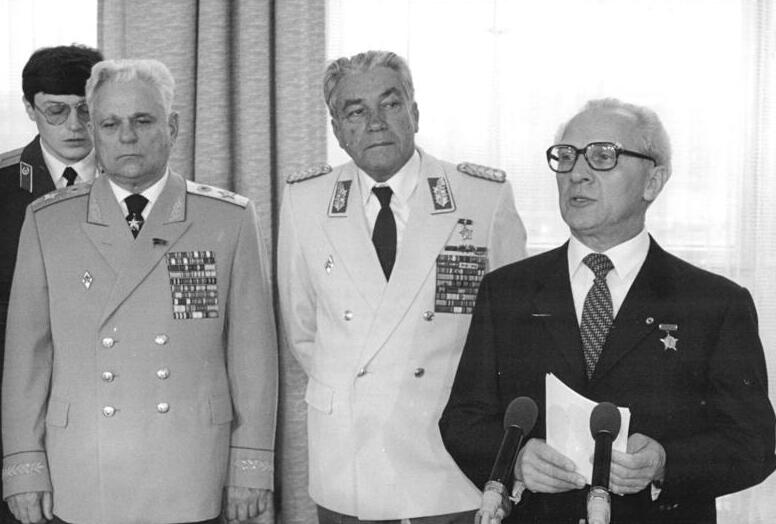
Erich Honecker, two weeks after making the Gera Demands

On 13 October 1980, Honecker articulated his vision for the relationship between the two German states at a party conference in Gera. He cited various "pro-Western" actions as evidence of the "contradictory nature of Federal Republic of Germany (FRG) politics," expressing concerns in West German attempts to infringe on the GDR's sovereignty, he stated that the intra-German relationship was put under strain. To preserve the formal division of East and West Germany, Honecker formulated four demands directed at the Schmidt government.

His first demand was that the West German government recognise the existence of East German citizenship, thereby challenging Article 116 of the Basic Law for the Federal Republic of Germany, which mandated that there could only be one German citizenship. Secondly, Honecker demanded the abolition of the Central Registry of State Judicial Administrations, a government agency in Salzgitter, tasked with compiling East German human rights violations. Honecker's third stipulation was the establishment of regular diplomatic relations between the two German states. This would have involved the conversion of the existing permanent representation in Bonn and East Berlin to official embassies. His final demand was that West Germany recognise the middle of the Elbe river as the border between the two states. This demand was also unconstitutional for West Germany.

== Reception ==
Honecker's demands were met with bewilderment by the West German public. The Hamburger Abendblatt reckoned that they had reversed the recent German rapprochement, while Der Spiegel wrote that Honecker had waged war on the people of East Germany. The Schmidt government did not heed any of the demands, though some state-level authorities stopped funding the Central Registry of State Judicial Administrations. According to the German historian Heinrich August Winkler, this speech, along with a stronger currency exchange requirement for visiting foreigners from capitalist states implemented earlier that day, put a halt to progress in warming the intra-German relationship.

Although the immediate reasons for the Gera Demands were never revealed, the historian Ulrich Mählert writes that Honecker's initiative was caused by turbulences within the Warsaw Pact. In the wake of an informal meeting between representatives of both states, Werner Krolikowski and Willi Stoph, two members of the GDR politburo, informed the leadership of the Soviet Union about the potential for renewed rapprochement with the West. In Mählert's view, Honecker acted to dispel Soviet doubts about his commitment to their shared anti-Western attitude. This possible explanation was reiterated by Sven Felix Kellerhoff in a 2020 article in Die Welt.

== Bibliography ==
- Mählert, Ulrich (2010). Kleine Geschichte der DDR (7th ed.). Munich: C.H. Beck. ISBN 978-3-406-59464-9.
- Winkler, Heinrich August (2007). Germany: The Long Road West 1933-1990. Vol. 2. Translated by Sager, Alexander J. Oxford: OUP Oxford. ISBN 978-0-19-150061-9.
- Wolle, Stefan (1998). Die heile Welt der Diktatur: Alltag und Herrschaft in der DDR. Berlin: Ch. Links Verlag. ISBN 978-3-86153-157-9.
