= Burgdorf =

Burgdorf may refer to:

== Places ==
- Burgdorf, Switzerland, a town in the canton of Berne, Switzerland
- Burgdorf district, a district in the canton of Berne, Switzerland
- Burgdorf, Hanover, a town in the district of Hanover, Lower Saxony, Germany
- Burgdorf, Wolfenbüttel, a municipality in the district of Wolfenbüttel, Lower Saxony, Germany
- Burgdorf, Idaho, USA, rustic hot springs resort (since the 19th century), and alleged town

== People ==
- Wilhelm Burgdorf (1895–1945), German general
