= Liebenburg =

Municipality in Lower Saxony, Germany

- Municipality
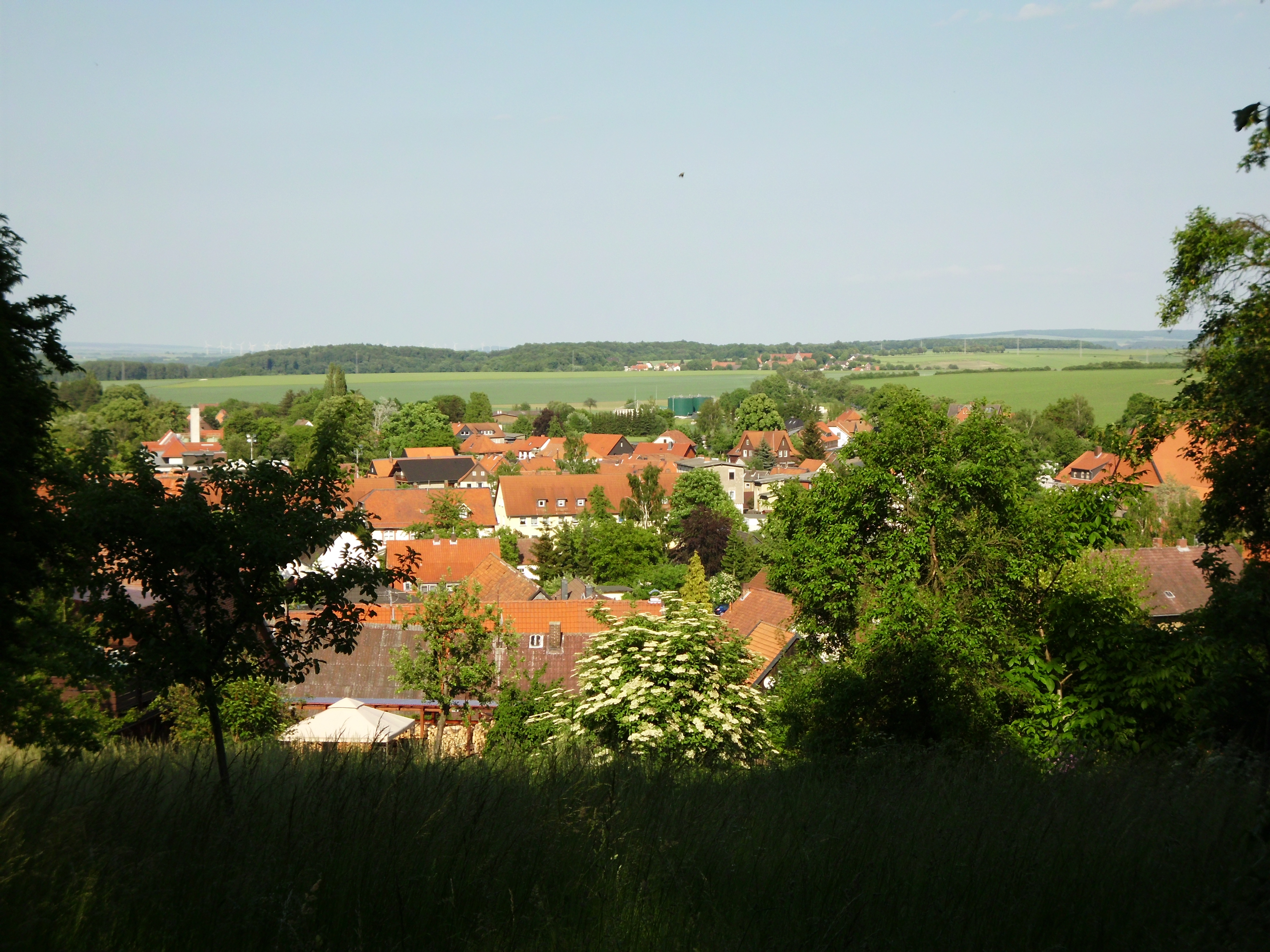

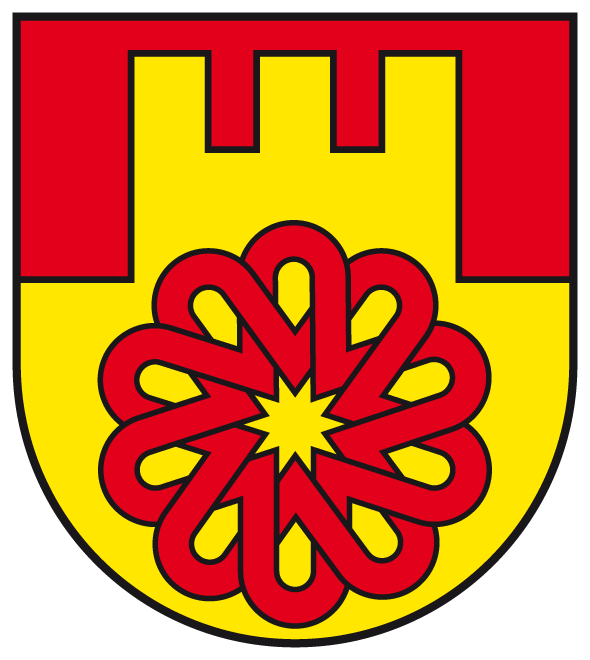
- Coat of arms

- Location of Liebenburg within Goslar district
- Interactive map of Liebenburg
- Location within Germany Location within Lower Saxony
- Coordinates: 52°01′27″N 10°26′02″E
- Country: Germany
- State: Lower Saxony
- District: Goslar
- Subdivisions: 10 districts

Government
  - Mayor (2021–26): Alf Hesse (SPD)

Area
  - Total: 78.51 km^{2} (30.31 sq mi)
- Elevation: 128 m (420 ft)

Population (2025-12-31)
  - Total: 7,784
  - Density: 99.15/km^{2} (256.8/sq mi)
- Time zone: UTC+01:00 (CET)
  - Summer (DST): UTC+02:00 (CEST)
- Postal codes: 38704
- Dialling codes: 05346
- Vehicle registration: GS
- Website: www.liebenburg.eu

Liebenburg (German pronunciation: [ˈliːbn̩bʊʁk]) is a municipality in the district of Goslar, in Lower Saxony, Germany.

== Geography ==
The municipal area is situated north of the Harz mountain range, within the eastern Salzgitter Hills of the Innerste Uplands. It borders on the district capital Goslar, approx. 12 km (7.5 mi) in the south; the adjacent municipalities in the north are Salzgitter-Bad and Schladen in Wolfenbüttel District.

=== Subdivisions ===
The municipality comprises Liebenburg proper (with 2,140 inhabitants) and the following nine villages, which were incorporated on 1 July 1972 with the following population as of 30 June 2018:

- Dörnten (1,189 inhabitants) with Kunigunde
- Groß Döhren (872)
- Heißum (301)
- Klein Döhren (420)
- Klein Mahner (333)
- Neuenkirchen (206)
- Ostharingen (246)
- Othfresen (1,902) with Heimerode and Posthof
- Upen (317)

== History ==
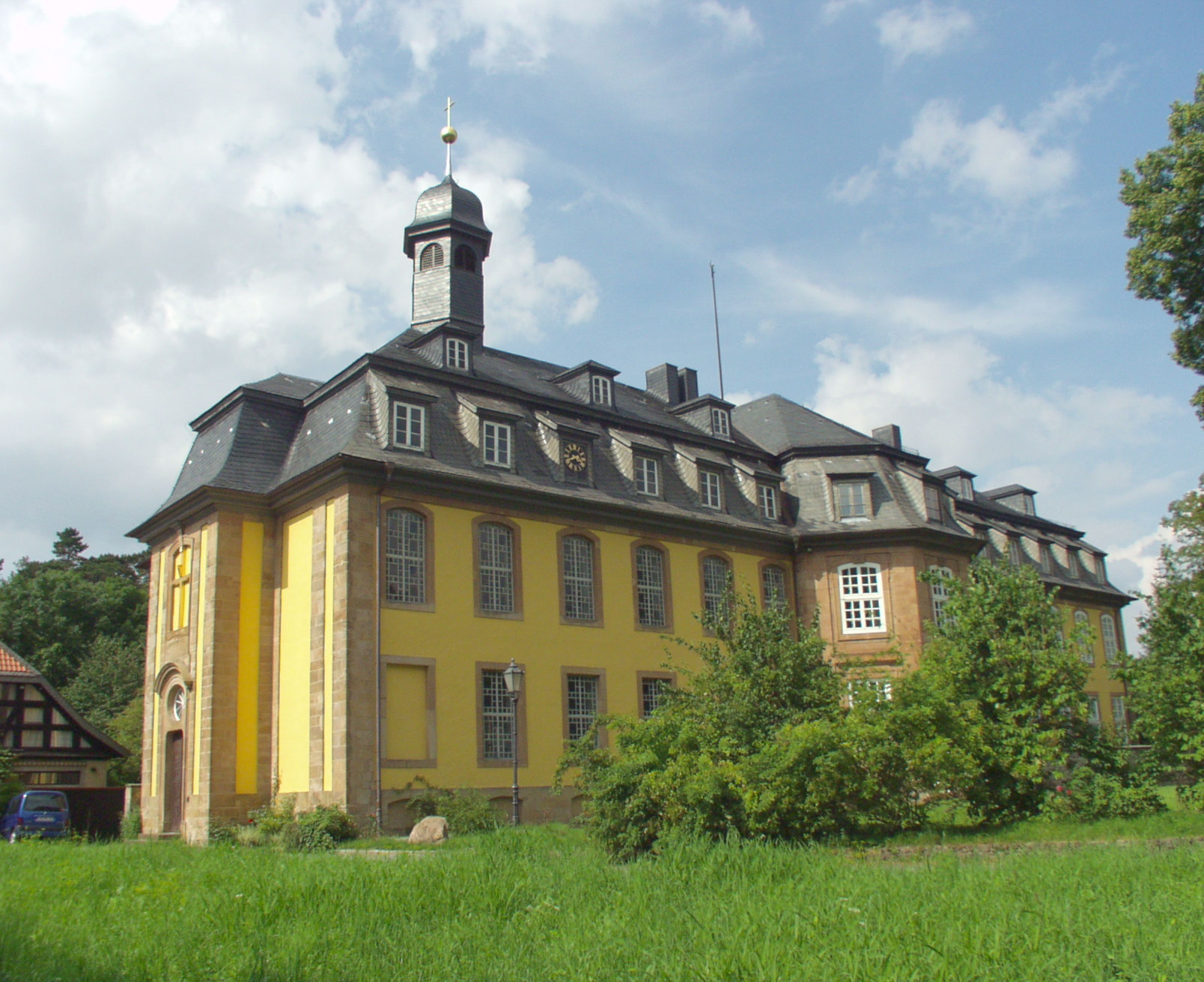
Liebenburg Castle Church

Archaeological excavations of a gallery grave indicate a settlement of the area in the Late Neolithic. The former Saxon estates in 1235 belonged to the territory of the newly established Prince-Bishopric of Hildesheim.

From 1292 to 1302, Prince-bishop Siegfried II of Querfurt had the Levenborch spur castle erected in the Salzgitter Hills, near where his episcopal lands bordered on the Principality of Brunswick-Wolfenbüttel. From 1366 it was pawned by his successors to the citizens of Braunschweig, important to secure the trade route to the Imperial City of Goslar.

The castle was seized by the warlike duke Henry V of Brunswick-Wolfenbüttel after the Hildesheim Diocesan Feud in 1523 and temporarily served as hidden residence of his mistress Eva von Trott. The Catholic duke in turn lost it to the Protestant Schmalkaldic League, whose troops campaigned the Brunswick lands from 1542 until their final defeat in the 1547 Battle of Mühlberg. During the Thirty Years' War, the stronghold was used as headquarters by the Imperial Generalissimo Albrecht von Wallenstein in 1625, it was occupied by Swedish troops in 1633, and reconquered by the Imperial Army in 1641.

By a 1643 peace treaty with the Braunschweig dukes, the heavily damaged castle was restored to Hildesheim, while day laborers and craftsmen lived within its walls. The Hildesheim prince-bishops promoted the settlement of Catholic families. The castle itself was partly rebuilt in a Baroque style by the order of the Wittelsbach prince-bishop Clemens August until construction work was abandoned due to the outbreak of the Seven Years' War in 1756. After the bishopric was finally secularised in 1802, Liebenburg fell to the Kingdom of Hanover in 1814.

=== Demographics ===
Population statistics

Year	Inhabitants
1821	4464
1848	5710
1871	5737
1885	5727
1905	6535
1925	6375

Year	Inhabitants
1933	6167
1939	8206
1946	13.208
1950	13.700
1956	12.279
1961	11.687

Year	Inhabitants
1968	11.143
1970	10.982
1975	10.405
1980	9851
1985	9502
1990	9655

Year	Inhabitants
1995	9803
2000	9693
2005	9431
2010	8777
2011	8620

(from 1968 on numbers of inhabitants as of 31 December)

== Politics ==
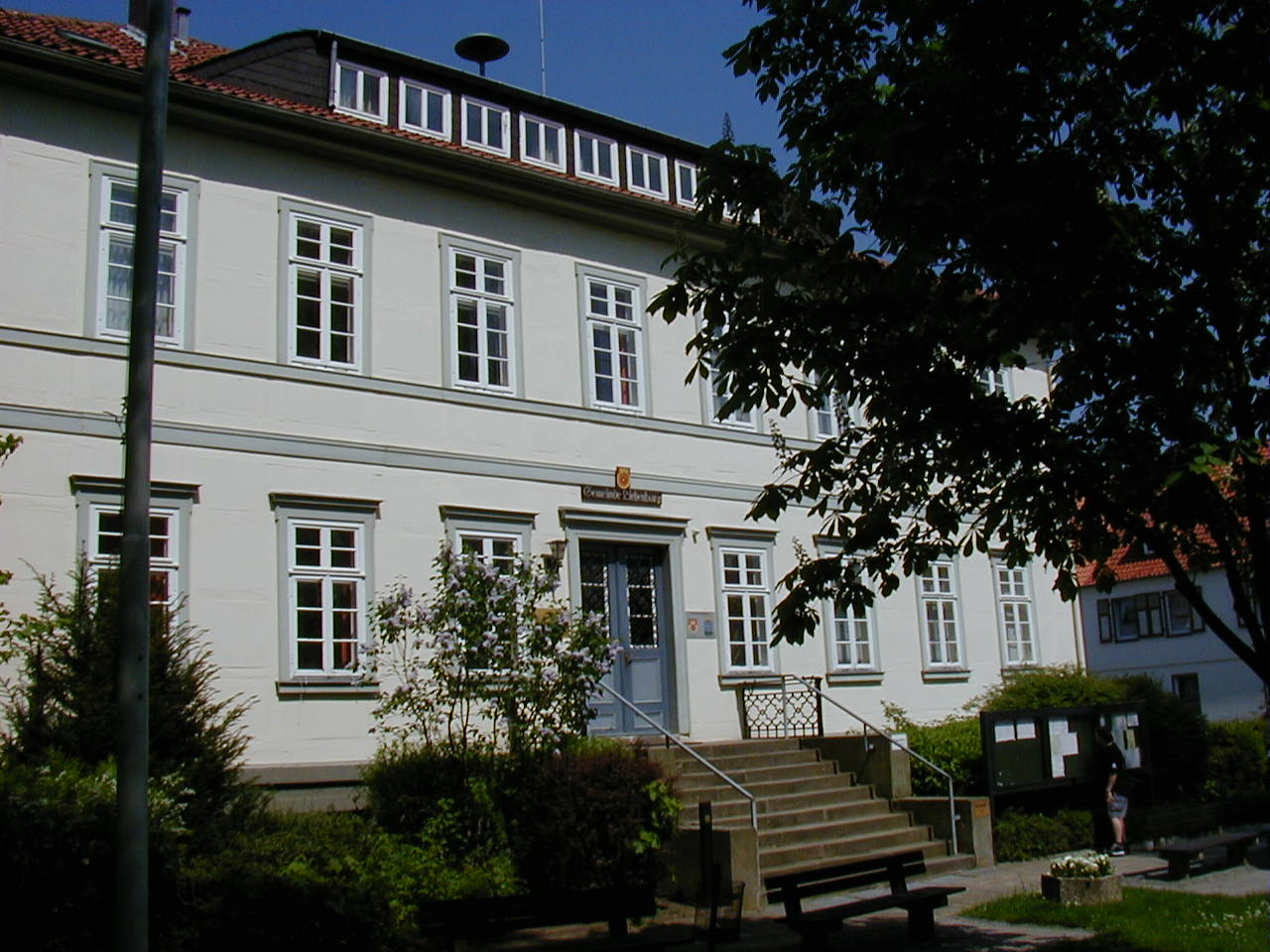
Town hall

Seats in the municipal assembly (Gemeinderat) as of 2011 local elections:

- SPD: 11 seats
- CDU: 8
- Greens: 1
- Die Linke: 1
- Free Voters: 1

Elections in September 2016:

- SPD: 10 seats
- CDU: 7 seats
- AfD: 2 seats
- Alliance 90/The Greens: 1 seat
- FDP: 1 seat
- The LEFT: 1 seat

== Mayors ==
- Since October 2013: Alf Hesse (SPD)
- 1996-2013: Hubert Spaniol (SPD)
