= Baddeckenstedt (Samtgemeinde) =

- Samtgemeinde
- Coat of arms

- Location of Baddeckenstedt within Wolfenbüttel district
- Interactive map of Baddeckenstedt
- Location within Germany Location within Lower Saxony
- Coordinates: 52°04′47″N 10°14′01″E
- Country: Germany
- State: Lower Saxony
- District: Wolfenbüttel
- Subdivisions: 6 municipalities

Government
  - Mayor (2021–26): Frederik Brandt (CDU)

Area
  - Total: 114.01 km^{2} (44.02 sq mi)
- Elevation: 110 m (360 ft)

Population (2025-12-31)
  - Total: 9,845
  - Density: 86.35/km^{2} (223.7/sq mi)
- Time zone: UTC+01:00 (CET)
  - Summer (DST): UTC+02:00 (CEST)
- Postal codes: 38271
- Dialling codes: 05345, 05347
- Vehicle registration: WF
- Website: baddeckenstedt.de

Baddeckenstedt is a Samtgemeinde ("collective municipality") in the district of Wolfenbüttel, in Lower Saxony, Germany. Its seat is in the village Baddeckenstedt.

The Samtgemeinde Baddeckenstedt consists of the following municipalities:

1. Baddeckenstedt
2. Burgdorf
3. Elbe
4. Haverlah
5. Heere
6. Sehlde
