= Waldenberger =

Waldenberger is a surname. Notable people with the surname include:

- Franz Waldenberger, German professor of Japanese economy
- Holger Waldenberger (born 1967), German professional quiz player
