= Warne (river) =

River in Germany

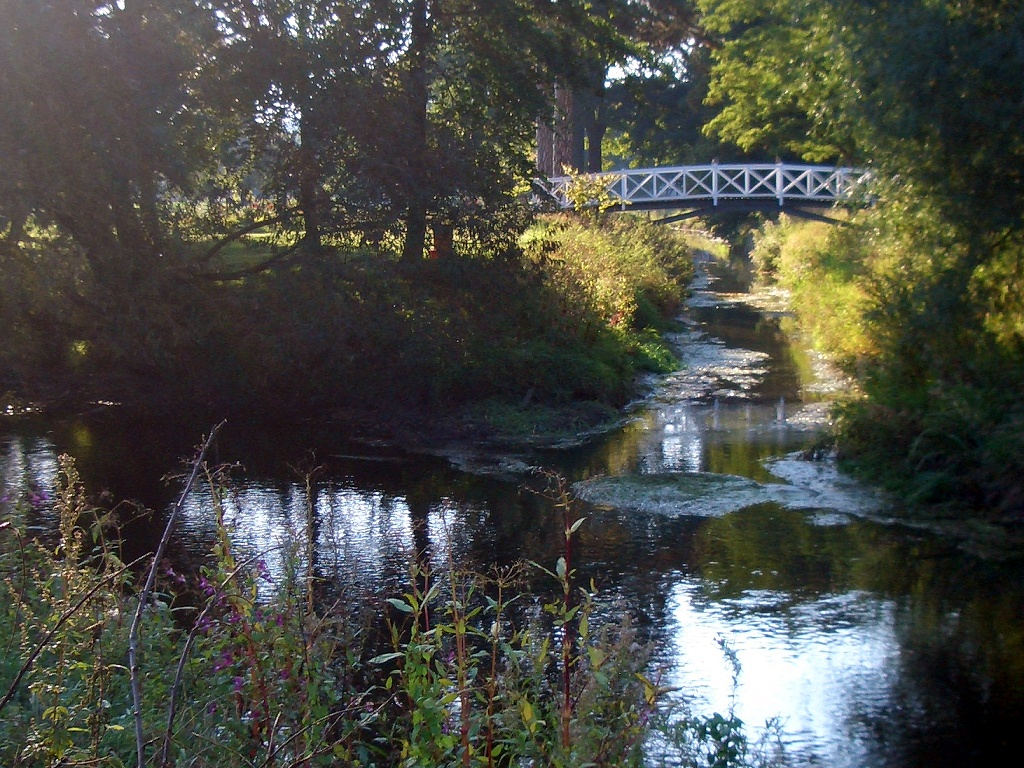
- The Warne discharging into the Oker at Dorstadt

Location
- Country: Germany
- State: Lower Saxony

Physical characteristics
- Source
  - location: West of Liebenburg
  - coordinates: 52.0238°N 10.3987°E
- Mouth
  - location: At Dorstadt into the Oker
  - coordinates: 52.0980°N 10.5710°E

Basin features
- Progression: Oker→ Aller→ Weser→ North Sea

Warne is a river of Lower Saxony, Germany.

The Warne springs west of Liebenburg. It is a left tributary of the Oker at Dorstadt.

== See also ==
- List of rivers of Lower Saxony
