= Immenrode =

- District of Goslar
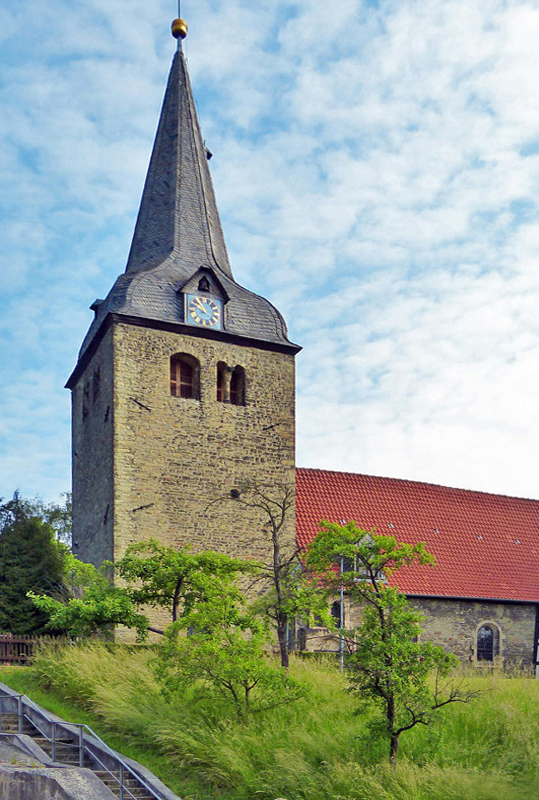
- Saints Cosmas and Damian Church

- Coat of arms
- Interactive map of Immenrode
- Location within Germany Location within Lower Saxony
- Coordinates: 51.95875°N 10.48419°E
- Country: Germany
- State: Lower Saxony
- District: Goslar
- City: Goslar

Area
  - District of Goslar: 10.07 km^{2} (3.89 sq mi)
- Elevation: 181 m (594 ft)

Population
  - Metro: 1,607
- Time zone: UTC+01:00 (CET)
  - Summer (DST): UTC+02:00 (CEST)
- Postal codes: 38690
- Dialling codes: 05324
- Website: immenro.de

Immenrode is a German village and Stadtteil (district) of the town of Goslar, Lower Saxony. The village is located approximately 5 kilometers west of Vienenburg, 7 kilometers northeast of Goslar, and 20 kilometers south of Braunschweig. Immenrode lies south of some small, wooded ridges in a flat area a few kilometres north of the Harz.

== History ==
The place name belongs to the so-called Rodungsnamen and indicates that, as with many toponyms ending in -rode, was built on a plot of land, originally woods or heath, cleared to make room for cultivation or pasture. The suffix -rode stems from the Germanic verb ryddan, which means "to remove", "to clear" or "to rid". The prefix immen- is common in place names, field names and also in personal names. It likely recalls the name of the founder of the settlement, perhaps an Immo.

The village was first mentioned in 1086 in a document in which Emperor Henry IV transferred the Royal Palace of Werla to Bishop Udo of Hildesheim, along with villas Immenrothe et Jehthere (probably referring to Gitter near Salzgitter). In the Middle Ages, the Counts of Woldenberg, the Neuwerk monastery and Count Gerhard of Holstein-Itzehoe owned property here. Immenrode has been a church village since the Middle Ages; the Wöltingerode Abbey held the patronage for several centuries.
