= Harlyberg =

Hill in Lower Saxony, Germany

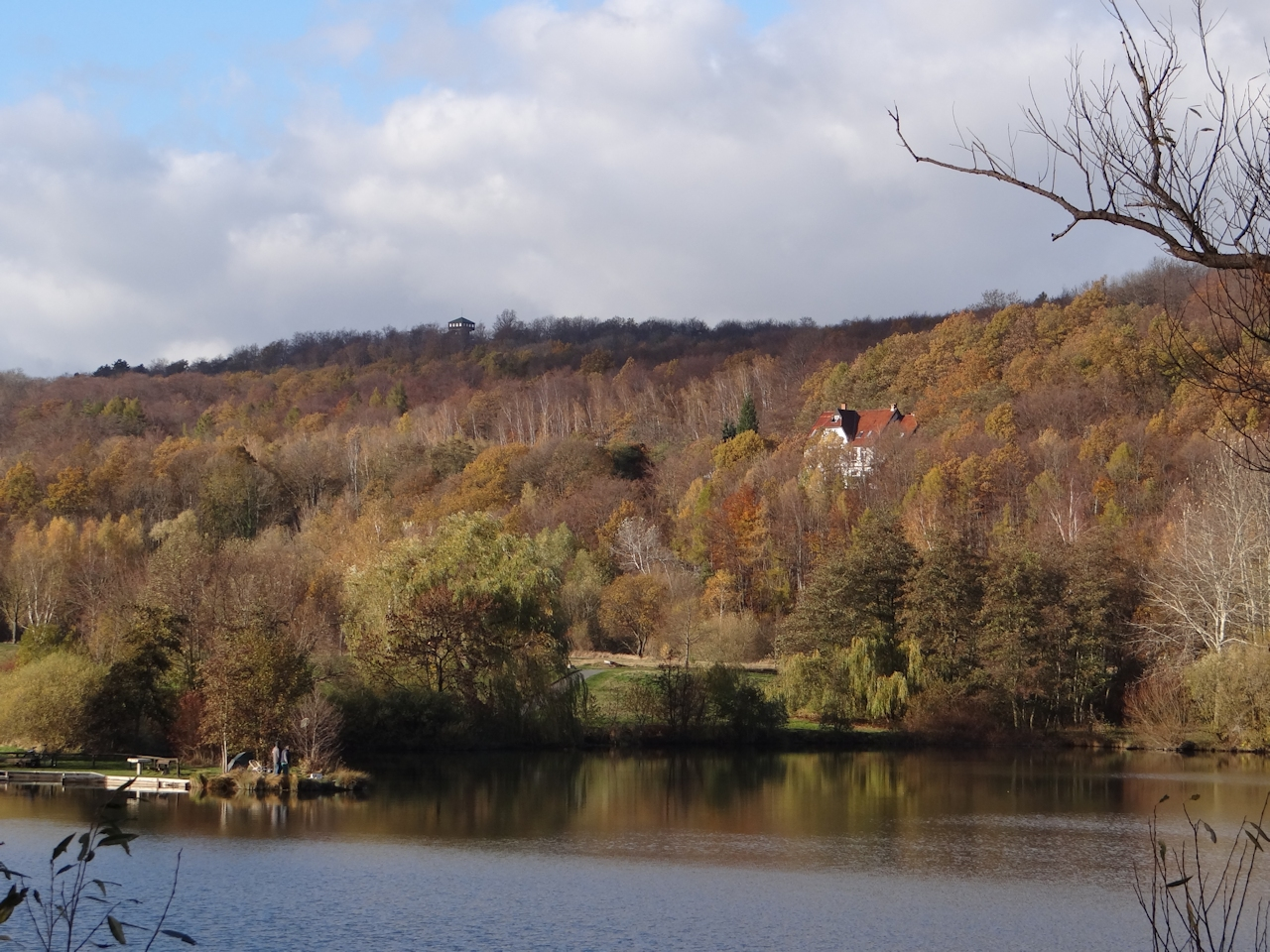

Highest point
- Elevation: 255.9 m above sea level (NN) (840 ft)
- Coordinates: 51°58′02″N 10°32′37″E

Geography
- Location within Lower Saxony
- Location: Lower Saxony, Germany
- Parent range: Harly Forest

The Harlyberg, at 255.9 m above sea level (NN), is the highest hill of the Harly Forest, and rises in the district of Goslar in southeastern Lower Saxony, central Germany.

Sometimes the term Harlyberg is used as a synonym for the entire Harly Forest (German: Harly-Wald), but this ignores the fact that there are other summits in that forested hill range.

== Geography ==
The hill is located just under 2 kilometres northwest of Vienenburg. It may be reached on various forest tracks and hiking trails that run through the Harly Forest - for example on the Kammweg ("ridgeway"). Almost exactly 2 kilometres southeast is the site of an old castle, the Harlyburg.

== Harly Tower ==
On the summit of the Harlyberg stands the Harly Tower (Harlyturm), an observation tower that was re-opened to tourists in 1986 after decades of decay and following major restoration. It is open when the flag is raised above its roof.

From the observation platforms – one glazed and one open one – of the Harly Tower there are views of the Harz Mountains to the south, the Elm to the north and the Huy to the east.
