= Heere =

- Municipality
- Location of Heere within Wolfenbüttel district
- Interactive map of Heere
- Location within Germany Location within Lower Saxony
- Coordinates: 52°04′N 10°15′E
- Country: Germany
- State: Lower Saxony
- District: Wolfenbüttel
- Municipal assoc.: Baddeckenstedt

Government
  - Mayor: Walter Beims (SPD)

Area
  - Total: 15.36 km^{2} (5.93 sq mi)
- Elevation: 115 m (377 ft)

Population (2025-12-31)
  - Total: 975
  - Density: 63.5/km^{2} (164/sq mi)
- Time zone: UTC+01:00 (CET)
  - Summer (DST): UTC+02:00 (CEST)
- Postal codes: 38277
- Dialling codes: 05345
- Vehicle registration: WF
- Website: www.baddeckenstedt.de

Heere (German pronunciation: [ˈheːʁə]) is a municipality in the district of Wolfenbüttel, in Lower Saxony, Germany.
