= Central Registry of State Judicial Administrations =

Former German government agency

Coordinates: 52°02′58″N 10°22′34″E

The Central Registry of State Judicial Administrations (German: Zentrale Erfassungsstelle der Landesjustizverwaltungen, ZESt) in Salzgitter, West Germany, was established on 24 November 1961 in the aftermath of the construction of the Berlin Wall. Its function was to verify human rights violations by the government of East Germany like homicide at the Inner German border, political persecution, torture and maltreatment, etc. Intended for deterrence, in the long run the information should have led to the initiation of criminal proceedings in the case of a reunification. The organization was financed by all western German States. It was dissolved in 1992 after the German reunification.

== History ==
The implementation of the Central Registry of State Judicial Administrations on 24 November 1961 was induced by the West Berlin mayor Willy Brandt in order to improve the nationwide coordination of the states' law enforcement agencies. The prosecutors working at the ZESt in Salzgitter-Bad were affiliated with the district attorney's office at Braunschweig. They initiated preliminary investigations, collected evidences and recorded testimonies. The ZESt also produced criminal reports on East German applicants for the West German civil service.

The East German government regarded the institution as an element of revanchism and interference in its domestic affairs. In the course of Brandt's Ostpolitik, the legitimation was increasingly challenged. General Secretary Erich Honecker explicitly demanded its dissolution, but also the Bundestag parliamentary group of the Social Democratic Party in a 1984 resolution unanimously denoted the ZESt "ineffective" and "needless". In 1987, the state government of North Rhine-Westphalia under Minister-President Johannes Rau annulled its benefits. Shortly before the fall of the Berlin Wall in 1989, the agency was about to fold.

After reunification, the ZESt provided its files on about 40,000 proceedings for the local law enforcement agencies in the new states of Germany, and was dissolved in 1992. Since 2007, the entire collection is preserved at the German Federal Archives in Koblenz.

== See also ==
- Stasi Records Agency
- Central Office of the State Justice Administrations for the Investigation of National Socialist Crimes
- International Society for Human Rights
