= Lichtenberg Castle (Salzgitter) =

Ruined castle in Lower Saxony, Germany

- Burg Lichtenberg, Heinrichsburg
- Salzgitter-Lichtenberg
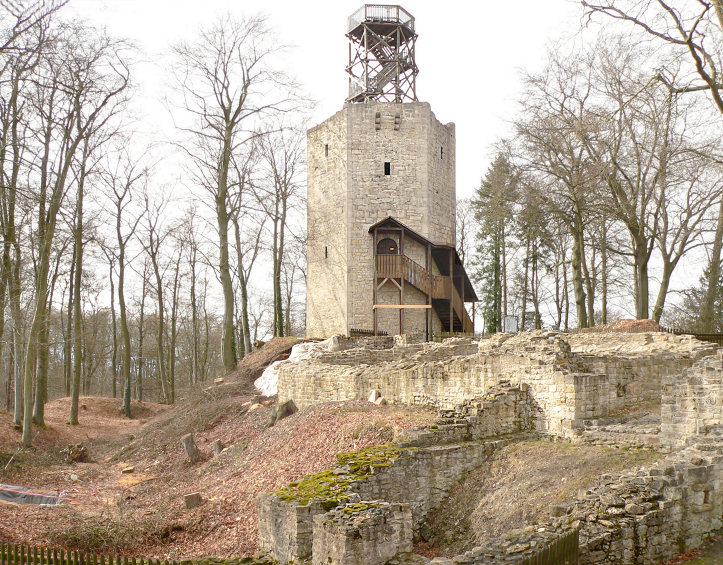
- Castle ruins with the bergfried. Left: moat; right: gate foundations

Site information
- Type: hill castle
- Code: DE-NI
- Condition: ruin

Location
- Coordinates: 52°07′17″N 10°17′19″E
- Height: 241 m above sea level (NN)

Site history
- Built: around 1180

Garrison information
- Occupants: dukes

Lichtenberg Castle (German: Burg Lichtenberg), also called the Heinrichsburg ("Henry Castle"), is a ruined castle dating to the 12th century in the Lichtenberge hills (the northwestern part of the Salzgitter Hills) near Salzgitter in the German state of Lower Saxony. The ruins are found south of and above the Salzgitter suburb of Lichtenberg on the steep summit of the Burgberg (241 metres high).

The site, which is extremely good from a strategic perspective, shows the ideal type of ground plan of a hill castle from the High Middle Ages. The builder of the most important fortifications of the Welf dynasty was Duke Henry the Lion. The castle was built to counter the Bishopric of Hildesheim and its Hohenstaufen neighbour in Goslar. In spite of numerous conflicts of those times, it was not destroyed until 1552 by the cannons of a mercenary army.

== Layout of the castle ==
The castle comprises an upper and lower wards. The upper ward lies on an oval plateau, 45 metres × 80 metres in area. Here there are various residential and domestic buildings, towers and the castle well, surrounded by a 1.6-metre-thick (5.2 ft) enceinte. In a residential building measuring 10 metres × 8.5 metres is a ladies' apartment (Kemenate) an old hot air heating system was uncovered during excavations. A little below the inner ward there is a 32-metre × 8-metre palas, with its great hall, as well as a neighbouring tower and dungeon.

The first construction phase of the castle is dated to the 12th century, and its expansion was probably carried out between 1170 and 1180. The large outer ward belongs to a more recent building phase. It was surrounded by a rampart and moat system as well as an enceinte with 13 demi-bastions. Of these, parts of the gate wall and the associated moat have survived. The only traces of former buildings are their individual foundation fragments.

== History ==
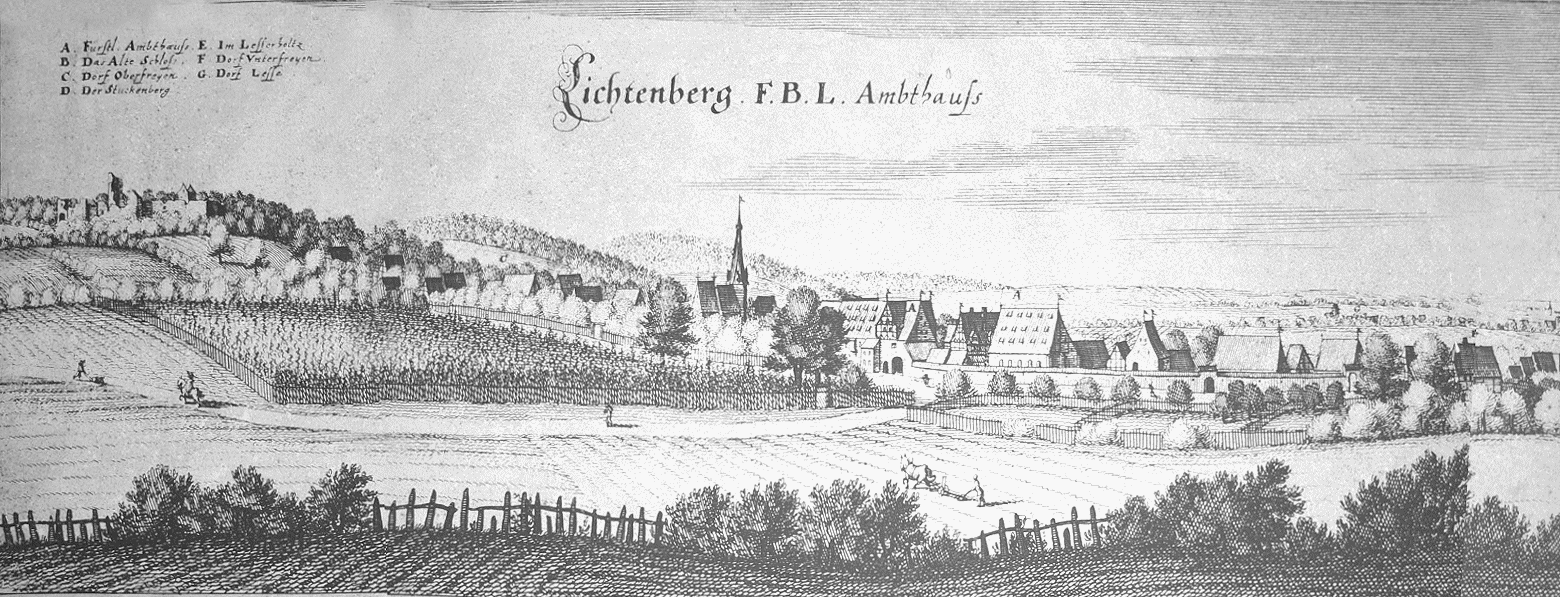
Merian copperplate around 1650 of the village of Lichtenberg. Left: the ruins on the hill

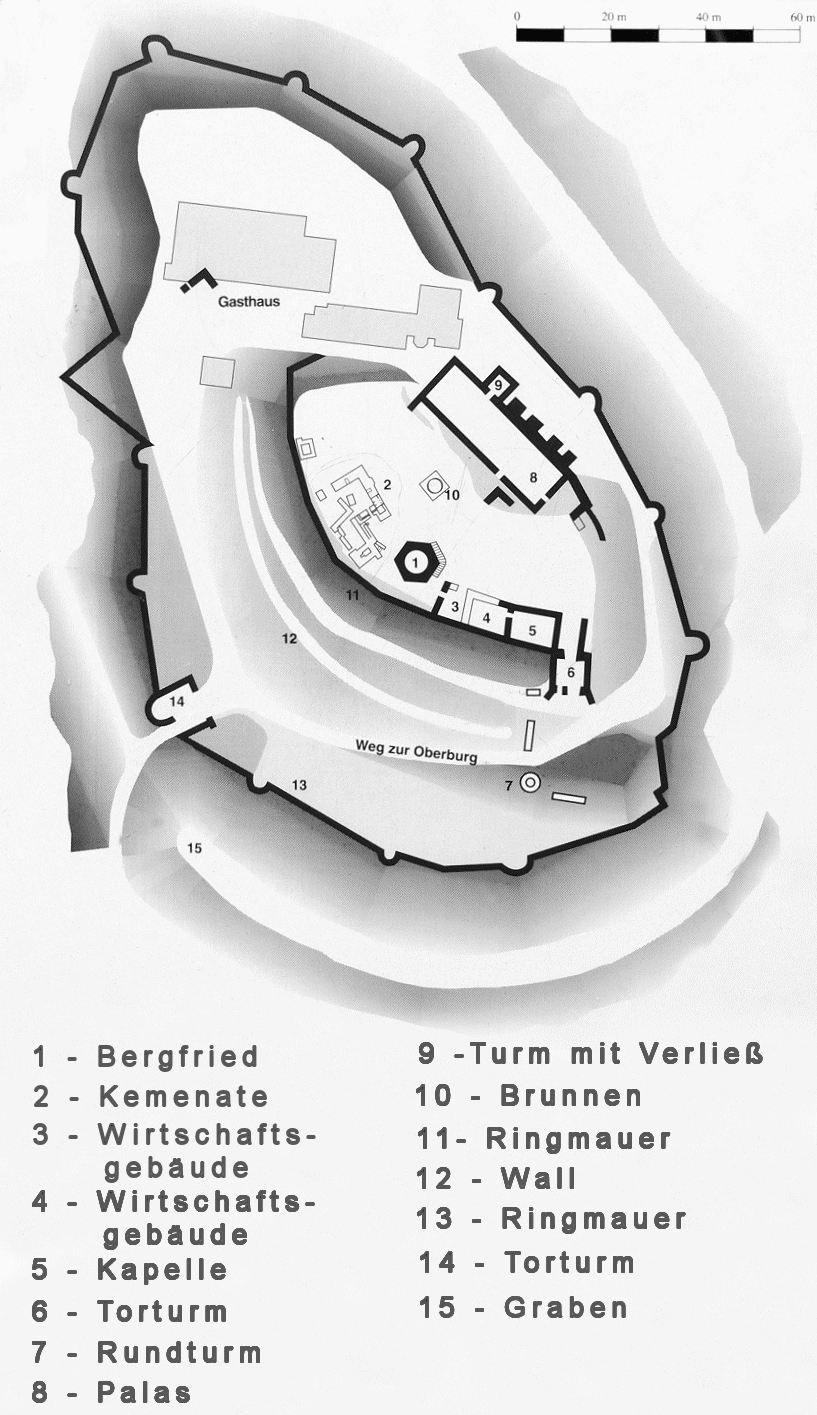
Ground plan of the castle. 1 Bergfried, 2 Ladies' apartment, 3 & 4 Domestic buildings, 5 Chapel, 6 & 14 Gate towers, 7 Round tower, 8 Great hall, 9 Tower with dungeon, 10 Well, 11 & 13 Curtain walls, 15 Dry moat

Lichtenberg Castle is first mentioned in 1180. The Welf duke, Henry the Lion (1129–1195) used it as a bulwark against the Hohenstaufen emperor, Frederick Barbarossa. The castle lay on the border of the Welf principality and threatened the neighbouring, non-Welf territories of the Bishopric of Hildesheim as the imperial estate of Goslar. In the course of his imperial expedition against Henry the Lion, Frederick Barbarossa captured the castle in 1180 after a short siege. The "Lion" did not get it back until after the peace treaty with the Hohenstaufen emperor, Henry VI in 1194. A year later, Henry the Lion, lord of the castle, died.

In 1198, the Hohenstaufen fraction in the empire elected Philip of Swabia as king, whereupon the Welf party choose Otto IV (the 16-year-old son of Henry the Lion) as antiking. Otto IV took advantage of the power base of Lichtenberg Castle in order to inflict damage on the imperial town of Goslar that was loyal to the Hohenstaufens. In order to safeguard the imperial estate of Goslar, in 1206 the Hohenstaufens had their imperial advocate (Reichsvogt) from Goslar, Count Hermann of Wöltingerode, advance against the castle which, rather surprisingly he managed to conquer. In early June 1206 Count Gunzelin of Wolfenbüttel unsuccessfully besieged Lichtenberg Castle, after Count Hermann had captured it and from there he conducted raids and forays in the surrounding region as well as in the area of Peine, Gunzelin's county.

When Otto IV became recognised as the only king in 1208 (after the murder of his adversary), the castle fell back into Welf hands. In 1218 he died and the castle was inherited by Duke Otto of Brunswick and Lüneburg, the Child. After his death, his son, Duke John of Brunswick and Lüneburg, inherited the estates and lordship of Lichtenberg. Periodically the castle was enfeoffed to the town of Brunswick, but in 1365 it was redeemed again by the lords of Saldern. They operated from the castle as robber knights; their raids being reported in the Brunswick book of fees in 1379-82. The noble von Saldern family was driven from the castle in the 15th century. In the records of that period Rudolf von Garßenbüttel and Herwig von Uetze are named as advocates (Vögte).

=== Destruction ===
In 1552 units under Count Vollrad of Mansfeld of the Schmalkaldic League advanced on the castle. He had invaded the Duchy of Brunswick with around 5,400 landsknechts and 2,100 horsemen and had already devastated towns in the Harz Foreland. The troops fired on the castle with heavy cannon, including large calibre Fürmösers (mortars). Since then Lichtenberg Castle has lain in ruins, its use as a quarry to build the state farm (Staatsdomäne) of Lichtenberg only added to its demise. In the same year Mansfeld appeared in like manner before Neuhaus Castle in Wolfsburg.

== Rebuilding ==
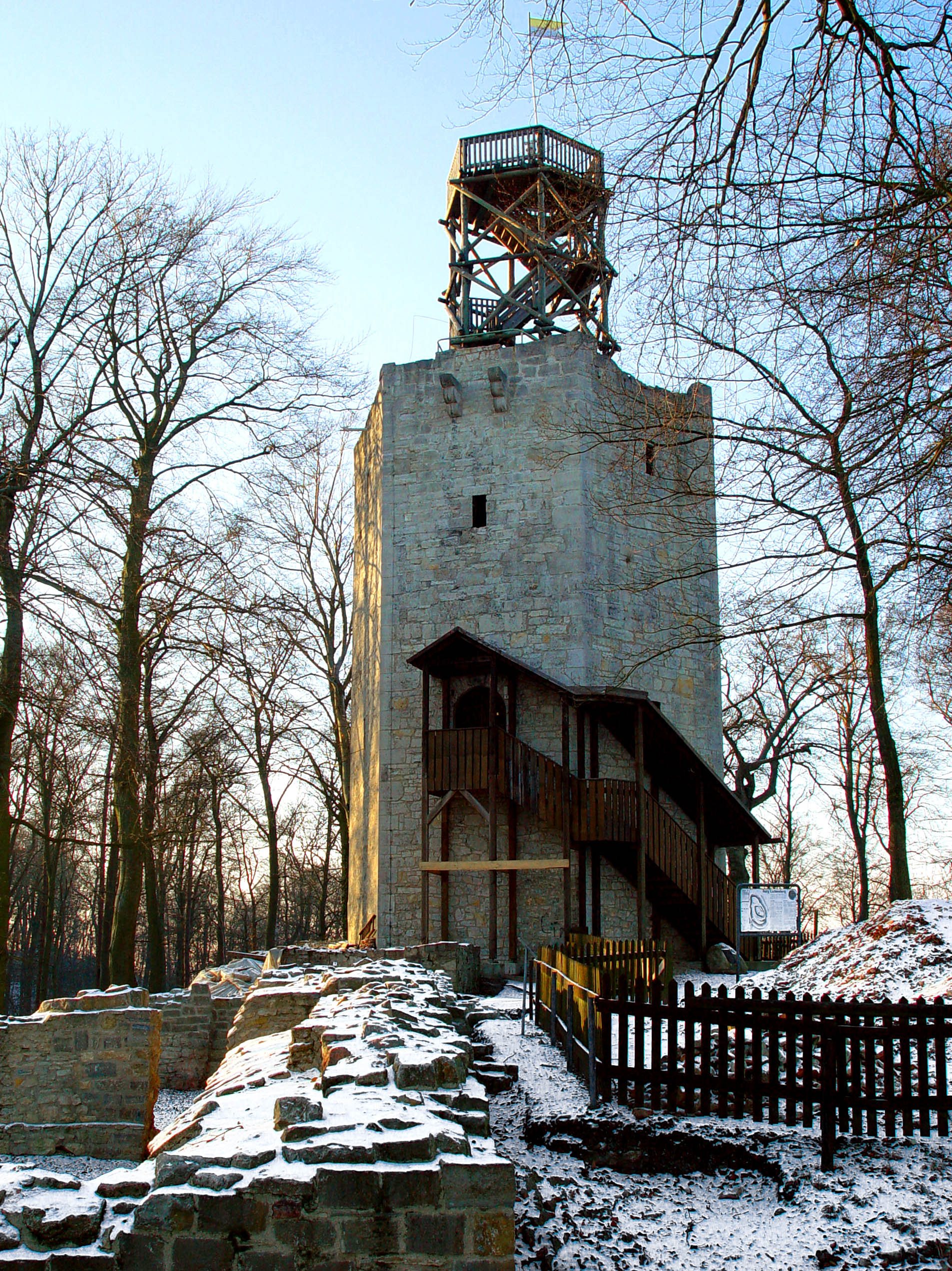
The new bergfried built around 1900

In the 19th century the castle ruins attracted public interest. The Bismarck era was responsible for an increased awareness of history and the slow awakening of nationalist ideas after the founding of the German Empire in 1871.

Since 1892, there has been a Society for the Preservation of Lichtenberg Castle, which was refounded in 1995 as the "Friends of Lichtenberg Castle" (200 members). In 1861 the bergfried, which had become a 15-metre-high (49 ft) ruin, collapsed and was demolished. Around 1900, the preservation society built a new tower on the old foundations, with the same hexagonal plan, which today has a wooden viewing platform with a height of about 25 metres. From the observation deck there are good views over the Harz Foreland to the Brocken. Investigations of the castle well showed it to be about 60 m deep and dug by hand. Since 2005, there has been a replica trebuchet, a medieval catapult engine, on the castle site. Next to the castle is a tourist restaurant with a beer garden and hotel.

== Literature ==
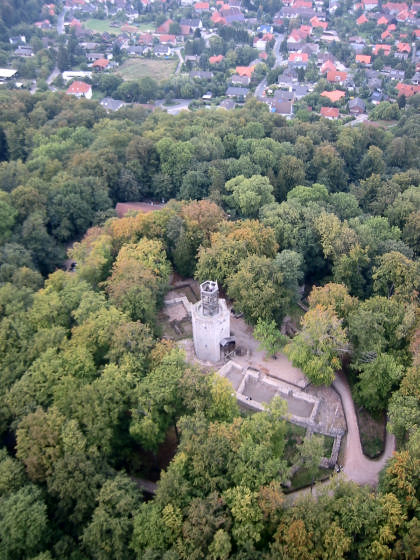
View of Lichtenberg Castle from the south. Background: the village of Lichtenberg

- Hans Adolf Schultz: Burgen und Schlösser des Braunschweiger Landes, Brunswick 1980, ISBN 3-87884-012-8
- Ernst Andreas Friedrich: Wenn Steine reden könnten. Vol. IV, Landbuch-Verlag, Hanover 1998, ISBN 3-7842-0558-5
