= Baddeckenstedt =

- Municipality
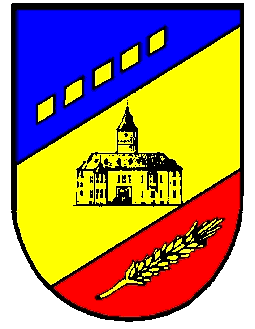
- Coat of arms

- Location of Baddeckenstedt within Wolfenbüttel district
- Interactive map of Baddeckenstedt
- Location within Germany Location within Lower Saxony
- Coordinates: 52°05′05″N 10°13′58″E
- Country: Germany
- State: Lower Saxony
- District: Wolfenbüttel
- Municipal assoc.: Baddeckenstedt
- Subdivisions: 5 Ortsteile

Government
  - Mayor: Marc Werner (SPD)

Area
  - Total: 20.45 km^{2} (7.90 sq mi)
- Elevation: 110 m (360 ft)

Population (2025-12-31)
  - Total: 2,946
  - Density: 144.1/km^{2} (373.1/sq mi)
- Time zone: UTC+01:00 (CET)
  - Summer (DST): UTC+02:00 (CEST)
- Postal codes: 38271
- Dialling codes: 05345, 05062
- Vehicle registration: WF
- Website: www.baddeckenstedt.de

Baddeckenstedt (German pronunciation: [baˈdɛkənˌʃtɛt]) is a municipality in the district of Wolfenbüttel, in Lower Saxony, Germany. It is situated in an exclave of the district, approx. 10 km southwest of Salzgitter, and 30 km southwest of Braunschweig.

Baddeckenstedt is also the seat of the Samtgemeinde ("collective municipality") Baddeckenstedt.

The municipality Baddeckenstedt consists of the following villages:

1. Baddeckenstedt
2. Binder
3. Oelber am weißen Wege
4. Rhene
5. Wartjenstedt

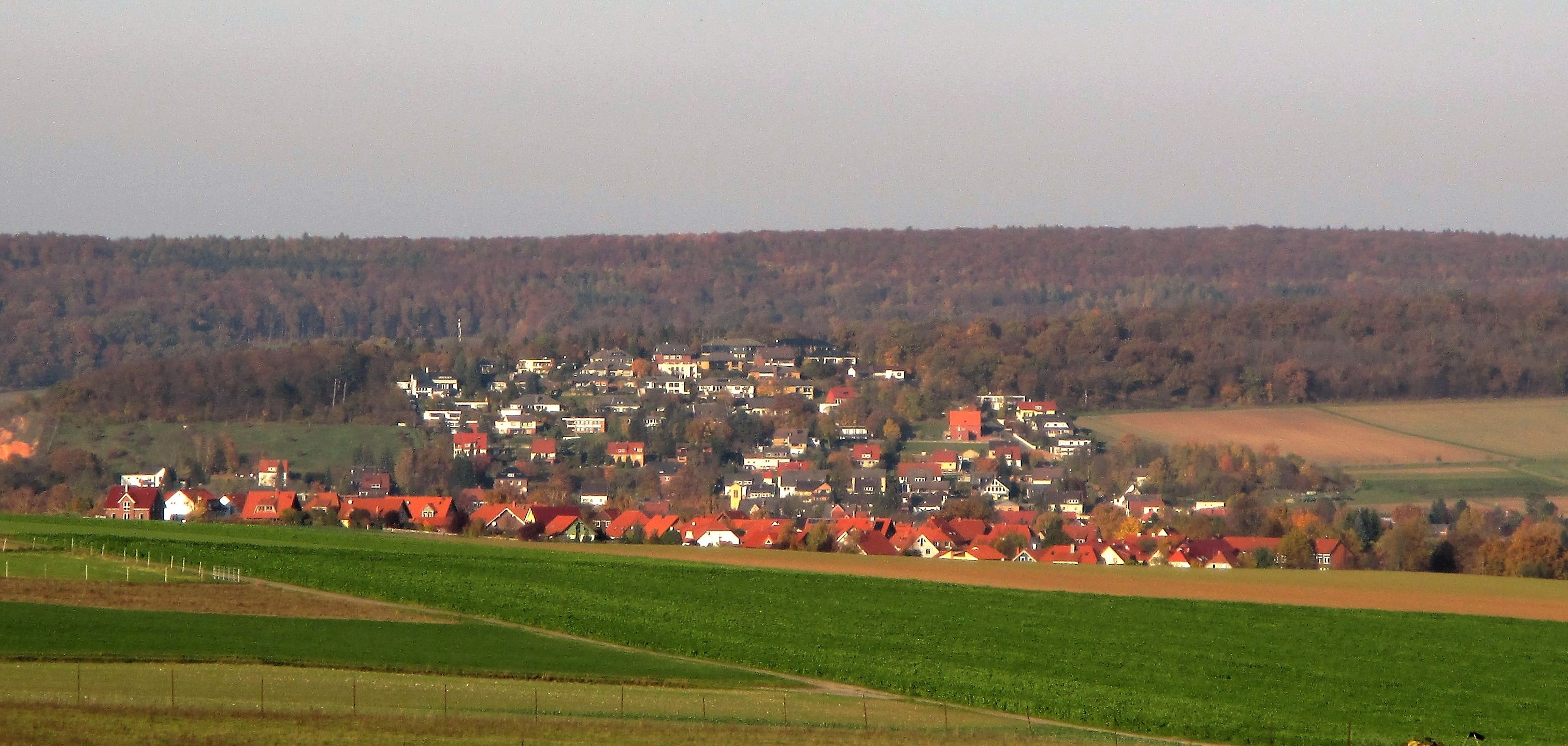
Baddeckenstedt
