= Franz Waldenberger =

German economist

Franz Waldenberger is professor for Japanese economy at LMU Munich.

== Career ==
Waldenberger began to research the Japanese economy in 1992 when he became a research assistant at the DIJ. He examined industrial organization and the employment and financial system of Japan. His habilitation thesis was on the subject of "Organisation und Evolution arbeitsteiliger Systeme – Erkenntnisse aus der japanischen Wirtschaftsentwicklung" ("The organisation and evolution of division of labour – insights from Japanese economic development"). In 1997, he became professor for Japanese economy at LMU Munich. Since then, he has added corporate governance, Japan's external links, and monetary and fiscal policy to his research interests. From 2014 to 2026, he took a leave from his position at LMU Munich to lead the German Institute for Japanese Studies as its director.

== Selected publications ==
- Die vertikale Integration von Unternehmen. Eine theoretische und empirische Analyse. Untersuchungen zur Wirtschaftspolitik, Bd. 86. Köln: Institut für Wirtschaftspolitik an der Universität zu Köln. 1991.
- Die japanische Wirtschaft heute - Ein Überblick. Miscellanea 10. Bonn, Tokyo: Deutsches Institut für Japanstudien. 170 S. 1994.
- Firms and Markets: Why Is Japan Different?. Miscellanea 8. Bonn, Tokyo: Deutsches Institut für Japanstudien. 33 S. 1994.
- Organisation und Evolution arbeitsteiliger Systeme - Erfahrungen aus der japanischen Wirtschaftsentwicklung. Monographien aus dem Deutschen Institut für Japanstudien 21. München: iudicium Verlag. 226 S., geb. 1999.
