= Elbe, Lower Saxony =

Elbe
- Municipality
- Location of Elbe within Wolfenbüttel district
- Interactive map of Elbe
- Location within Germany Location within Lower Saxony
- Coordinates: 52°05′N 10°17′E
- Country: Germany
- State: Lower Saxony
- District: Wolfenbüttel
- Municipal assoc.: Baddeckenstedt
- Subdivisions: 3

Government
  - Mayor: Friedhelm Vree (SPD)

Area
  - Total: 16.74 km^{2} (6.46 sq mi)
- Elevation: 119 m (390 ft)

Population (2025-12-31)
  - Total: 1,470
  - Density: 87.8/km^{2} (227/sq mi)
- Time zone: UTC+01:00 (CET)
  - Summer (DST): UTC+02:00 (CEST)
- Postal codes: 38274
- Dialling codes: 05345
- Vehicle registration: WF
- Website: www.baddeckenstedt.de

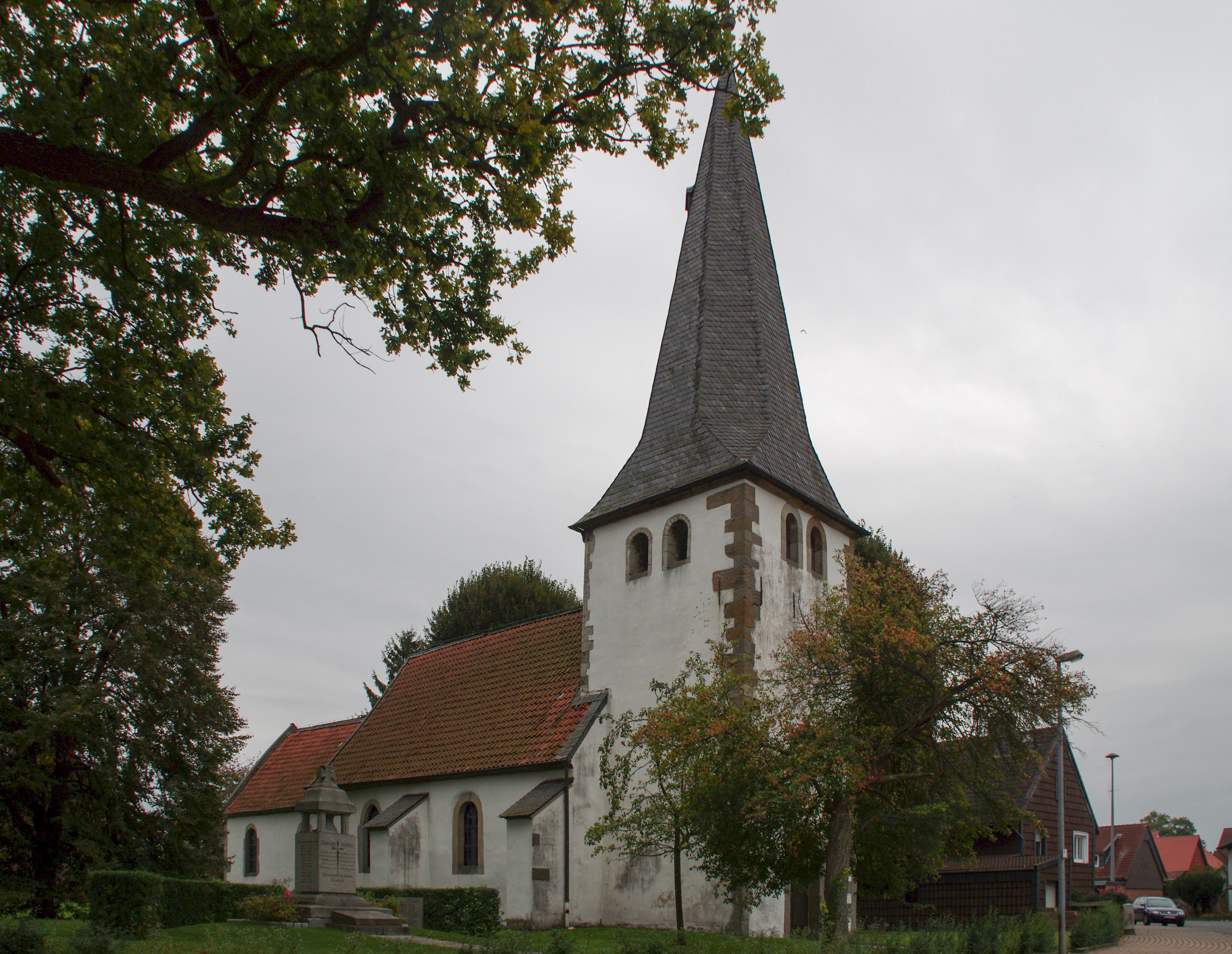
Church in Gustedt

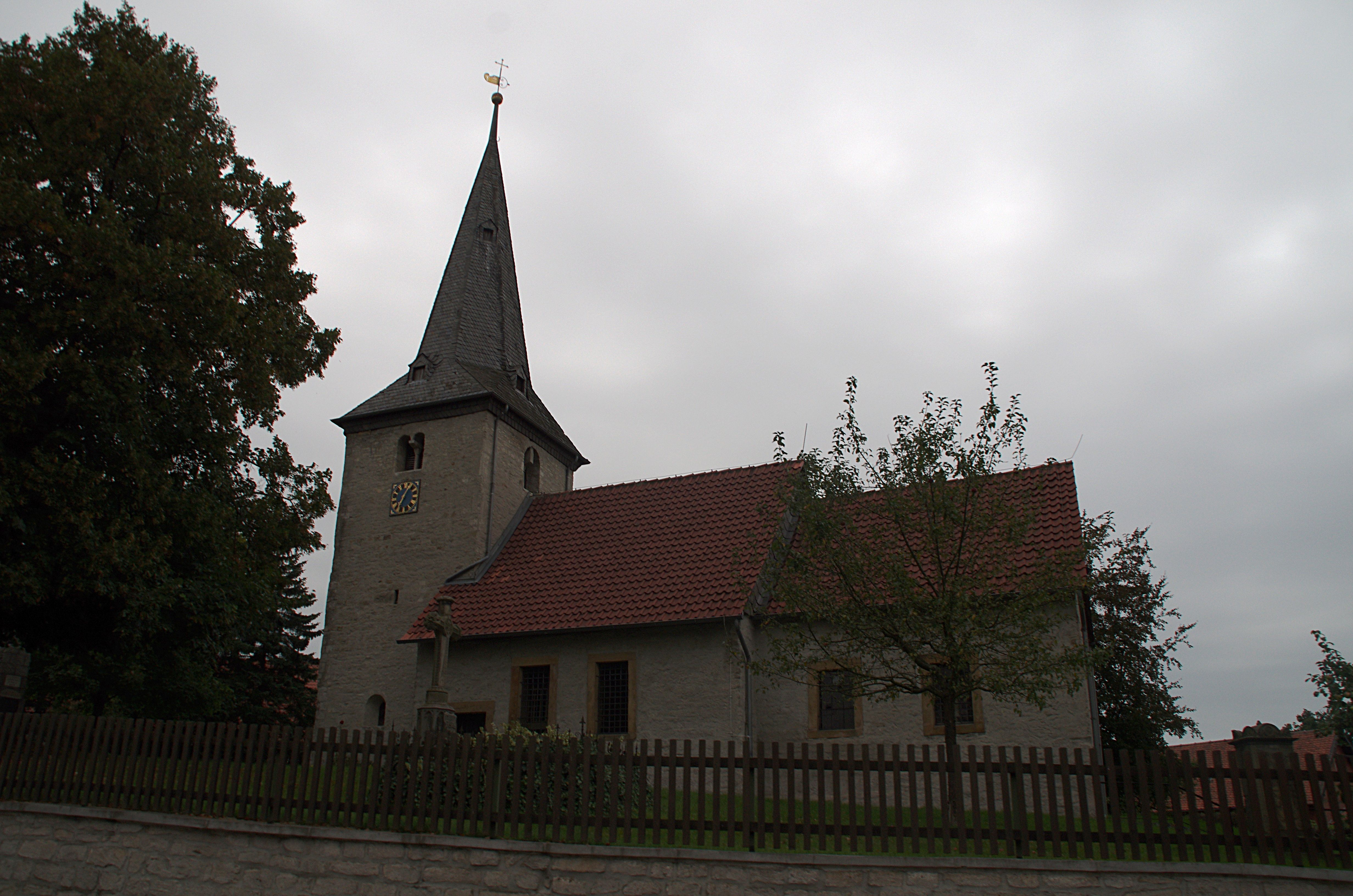
Church in Klein Elbe

Elbe (German pronunciation: [ˈɛlbə]) is a municipality in the district of Wolfenbüttel, in Lower Saxony, Germany.
