= Haverlah =

- Municipality
- Coat of arms

- Location of Haverlah within Wolfenbüttel district
- Interactive map of Haverlah
- Location within Germany Location within Lower Saxony
- Coordinates: 52°04′N 10°20′E
- Country: Germany
- State: Lower Saxony
- District: Wolfenbüttel
- Municipal assoc.: Baddeckenstedt
- Subdivisions: 3

Government
  - Mayor: Gerd Mielicki (SPD)

Area
  - Total: 16.84 km^{2} (6.50 sq mi)
- Elevation: 160 m (520 ft)

Population (2025-12-31)
  - Total: 1,528
  - Density: 90.74/km^{2} (235.0/sq mi)
- Time zone: UTC+01:00 (CET)
  - Summer (DST): UTC+02:00 (CEST)
- Postal codes: 38275
- Dialling codes: 05341
- Vehicle registration: WF
- Website: www.baddeckenstedt.de

Haverlah is a municipality in the district of Wolfenbüttel, in Lower Saxony, Germany.
