= Counts of Woldenberg =

Noble family

The Counts of Woldenberg, of Wohldenberg, formerly lords of Wöltingerode, were a prosperous noble family of the High Middle Ages situated northwest of the Harz Mountains. They take their name from Wohldenberg Castle, which was constructed between 1153 and 1160. In 1174 they converted their previous ancestral seat, Wöltingerode Castle, into a Benedictine monastery, thereby founding Wöltingerode Abbey.

In 1383, their property fell to the Bishopric of Hildesheim on the extinction of the family.

== Prominent members ==
- Adelheid von Woldenberg (died 1208/09), first Abbess of the St. Aegidii Monastery in Münster
- Burkhard I von Woldenberg (died 8 February 1235 in Constantinople)
- Heinrich II von Woldenberg (died 1318 in Avignon), Bishop of Hildesheim
- Otto II von Woldenberg (died 1331 in Hildesheim), Bishop of Hildesheim
- Mechthild II von Wohldenberg (died 1316), Abbess of Gandersheim Abbey
- Ludiger von Woldenberg (died ca. 1203), Count of Woldenberg

== Literature ==
- Jan Habermann: Verbündete Vasallen. Die Netzwerke von Grafen und Herren am Nordwestharz im Spannungsgefüge zwischen rivalisierenden Fürstgewalten (ca. 1250-1400). Norderstedt 2011.
- Wolfgang Petke: Die Grafen von Wöltingerode Wohldenberg. Adelsherrschaft, Königtum und Landesherrschaft am Nordwestharz im 12. und 13. Jahrhundert. Hildesheim 1971. (Veröffentlichungen des Instituts für Historische Landesforschung der Universität Göttingen, 4)
