= Burgdorf, Wolfenbüttel =

Burgdorf
- Municipality
- Coat of arms

- Location of Burgdorf within Wolfenbüttel district
- Interactive map of Burgdorf
- Location within Germany Location within Lower Saxony
- Coordinates: 52°09′N 10°13′E
- Country: Germany
- State: Lower Saxony
- District: Wolfenbüttel
- Municipal assoc.: Baddeckenstedt
- Subdivisions: 5 districts

Government
  - Mayor: Heinz Heusmann (SPD)

Area
  - Total: 24.21 km^{2} (9.35 sq mi)
- Elevation: 106 m (348 ft)

Population (2025-12-31)
  - Total: 2,080
  - Density: 85.9/km^{2} (223/sq mi)
- Time zone: UTC+01:00 (CET)
  - Summer (DST): UTC+02:00 (CEST)
- Postal codes: 38272
- Dialling codes: 05347
- Vehicle registration: WF
- Website: www.baddeckenstedt.de

Burgdorf (German pronunciation: [ˈbʊʁkˌdɔʁf]) is a municipality in the district of Wolfenbüttel, in Lower Saxony, Germany.
