= Vienenburg =

- Ortsteil of Goslar
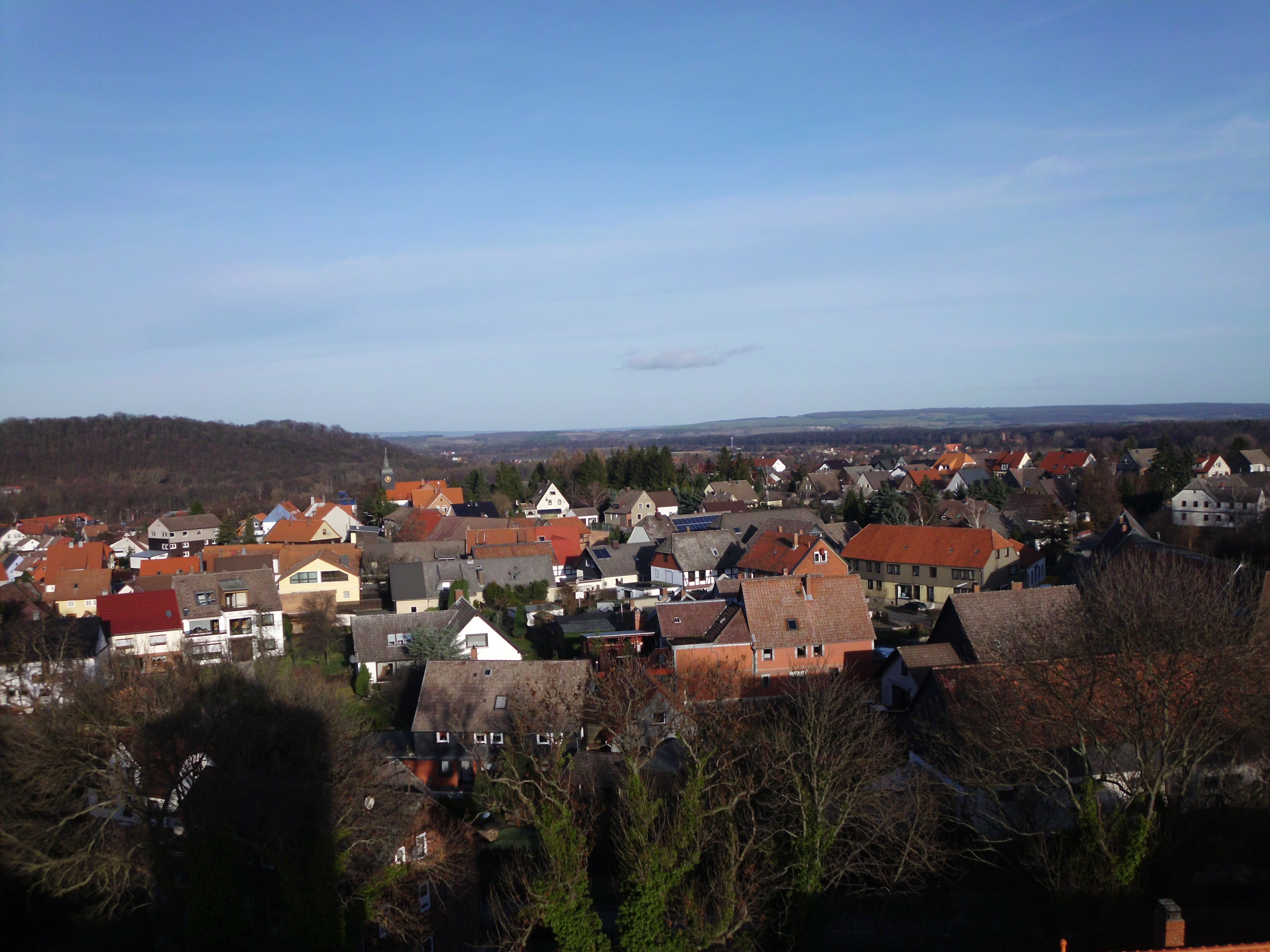

- Coat of arms
- Interactive map of Vienenburg
- Location within Germany Location within Lower Saxony
- Coordinates: 51°57′11″N 10°33′40″E
- Country: Germany
- State: Lower Saxony
- District: Goslar
- Town: Goslar

Area
  - Total: 71.14 km^{2} (27.47 sq mi)
- Elevation: 141 m (463 ft)

Population (2012-12-31)
  - Total: 10,668
  - Density: 150.0/km^{2} (388.4/sq mi)
- Time zone: UTC+01:00 (CET)
  - Summer (DST): UTC+02:00 (CEST)
- Postal codes: 38690
- Dialling codes: 05324
- Vehicle registration: GS
- Website: www.vienenburg.de

Vienenburg (German pronunciation: [ˈfiːnənbʊʁk]) is a borough of Goslar, capital of the Goslar district, in Lower Saxony, Germany. The former independent municipality was incorporated in Goslar on 1 January 2014.

== Geography ==
It is situated in the north of the Harz mountain range and east of the Harly Forest on the Oker River near its confluence with the Radau, about 10 km (6.2 mi) northeast of the Goslar town centre. Neighbouring municipalities are Bad Harzburg in the south and Schladen-Werla in the north.

The former township consisted of Vienenburg proper and the surrounding villages Immenrode, Lengde, Weddingen, Lochtum and Wiedelah, all incorporated in 1972. Situated in a mainly agricultural area, it is known for the Harzer cheese, although the production was transferred to Saxony in 2004.

== History ==
The Harlyberg hill (256m/840 ft) north of the town was the site of a castle built in 1203 by the Welf king Otto IV of Germany to threaten the trade route to Goslar, as its citizens supported his Hohenstaufen rival Duke Philip of Swabia. After Otto's death in 1218 the castle became a property of the Welf Dukes of Brunswick-Lüneburg and a thorn in the side of the Bishops of Hildesheim, while the garrisons of the castle were notorious for permanently robbing bypassing merchants. Therefore, Prince-bishop Siegfried II of Hildesheim declared war against Duke Henry I of Brunswick and in 1291 took and slighted the castle. Some moats are still visible today. A modern observation tower stands nearby.

A second castle up de Viene was first mentioned in a 1306 deed. It was erected by the Counts of Wernigerode, then at the behest of the Hildesheim prince-bishops, who purchased it in 1367. After the Hildesheim Diocesan Feud, the castle was occupied by Duke Henry V of Brunswick-Wolfenbüttel. During the Thirty Years' War, it was conquered by the Imperial troops of Albrecht von Wallenstein in 1626. The estates were restored to the Bishopric of Hildesheim in 1647.

The adjacent settlement remained part of the episcopal lands until the 1803 German mediatization and fell to the newly established Kingdom of Hanover in 1814. Vienenburg received town privileges in 1935. Part of the Prussian Province of Hanover since 1866, it was incorporated into the Free State of Brunswick in 1941.

=== Wöltingerode Abbey ===
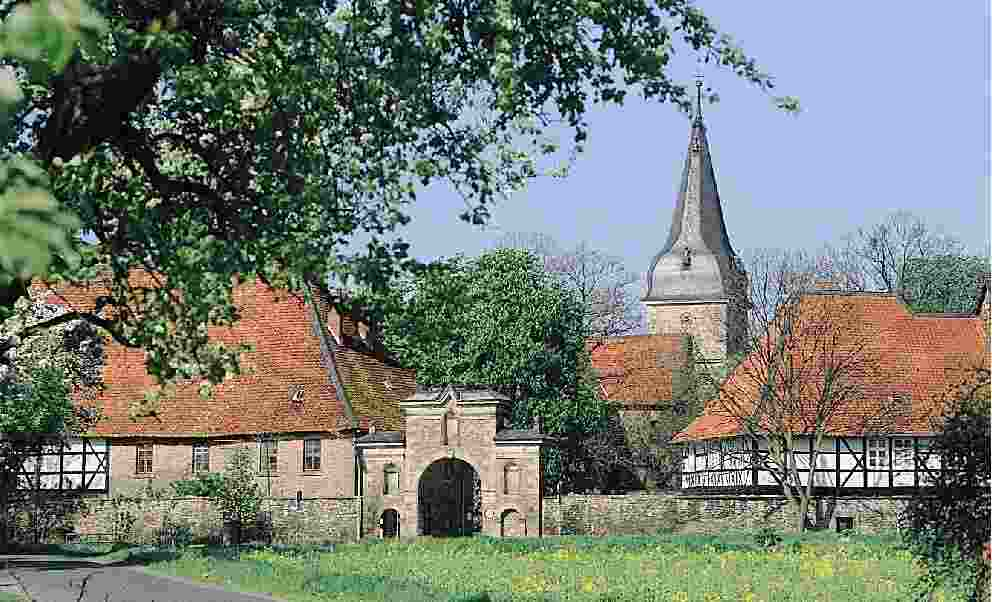
Wöltingerode

In 1174 the Counts of Wohldenberg established a Benedictine monastery at their ancestral seat west of Vienenburg, which converted into a Cistercian nunnery a few years later, confirmed by Emperor Frederick Barbarossa in 1188 and by Pope Honorius III in a 1216 deed. The abbey affiliated to the Bishopric of Hildesheim generated several filial monasteries and left a collection of notable manuscripts, now kept at the Herzog August Library in Wolfenbüttel.

In 1523 the Prince-bishop of Hildesheim had to cede Wöltingerode to Duke Henry the Younger of Brunswick-Wolfenbüttel as a result of the Great Diocesan Feud. Henry's son Duke Julius turned Protestant in 1568 and in consequence a Lutheran abbess was installed as head of the monastery.

During the Thirty Years' War the Hildesheim Prince-bishop Ferdinand of Bavaria, backed by the Catholic League and his Wittelsbach relatives, took the occasion to regain the lost territories. Referring to the 1629 Edict of Restitution issued by Emperor Ferdinand II, he had the nuns expelled and put the abbey under Jesuit rule. Nevertheless, in 1632 the Catholic canons again had to abscond from the approaching Swedish army and Wöltingerode, though it finally fell back to the Hildesheim Bishopric in 1643, remained Lutheran until the 1803 secularisation.

Today Wöltingerode is known for its abbey church, a Romanesque basilica of the late 12th century with an attached cloister and a crypt, which serves for storage of the Wöltingerode Korn, distilled here since 1682.

== Politics ==
Seats in the last municipal assembly (Stadtrat) as of 2011 elections:

- Social Democratic Party of Germany (SPD): 10 (38.92%)
- Christian Democratic Union (CDU): 8 (29.98%)
- Bürger für Vienenburg (Free Voters): 5 (17.51%)
- Green Alternative Voters (GAW): 2 (8.69%)
- National Democratic Party of Germany (NPD): 1 (3.00%)

In December 2012, the assembly voted for the amalgamation with Goslar.

== Transport ==
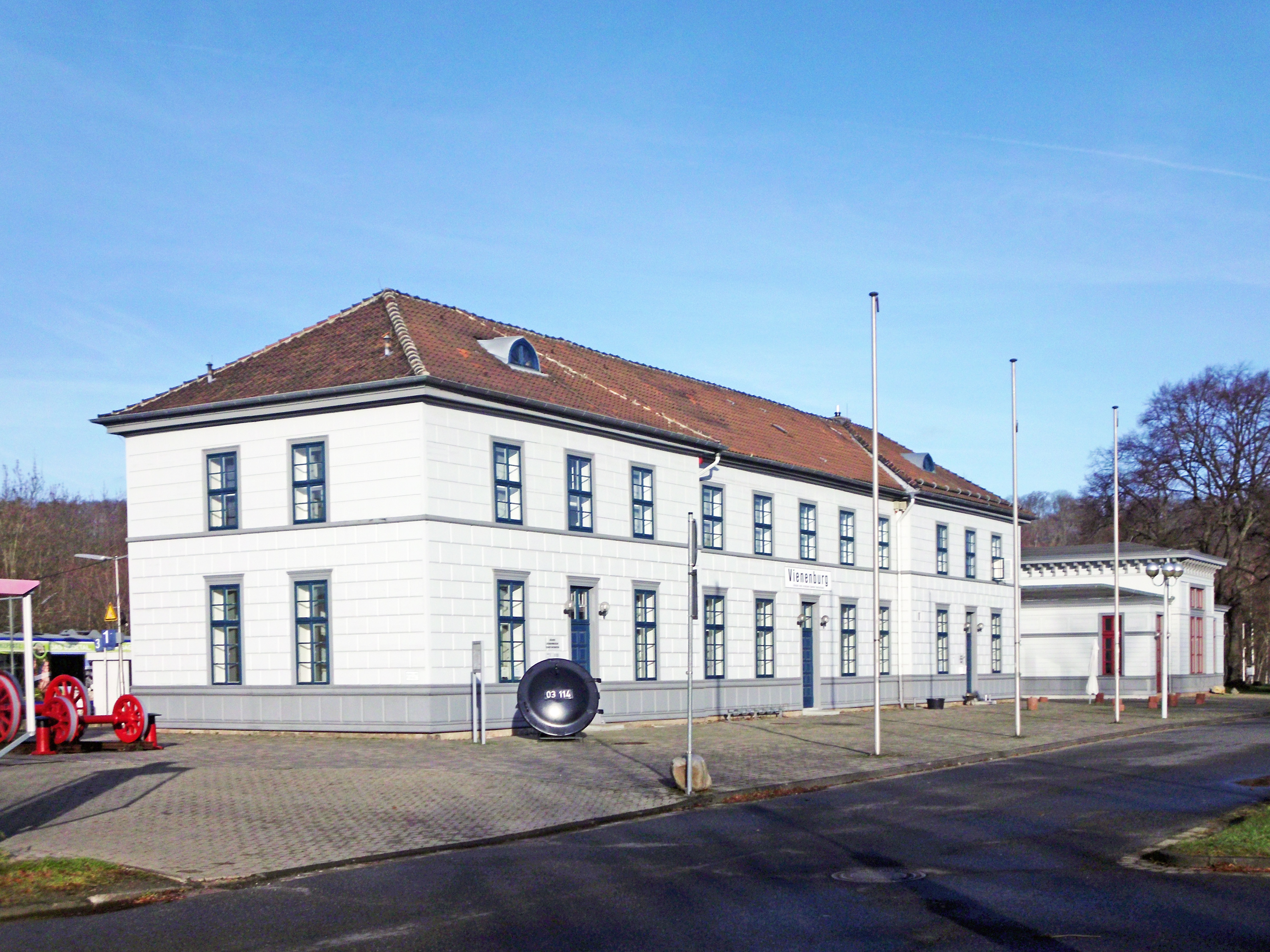
Railway station

Vienenburg's railway station, opened in 1840 on the Brunswick–Bad Harzburg railway of the Duchy of Brunswick State Railway, is the oldest preserved one in Germany and a regional railway hub. From Vienenburg, railway lines run in four directions: north to Brunswick, southeast to Halberstadt–Halle, south to Bad Harzburg and southwest to Oker–Goslar.

The old goods line to Langelsheim was a victim of the division of Germany and was never reactivated.

Vienenburg lies on the B 82 (link to the A 7 Hannover/Kassel) and 241 (Goslar) federal highways as well as the B 82 (link to the A 2; Brunswick, Berlin/Dortmund) and the B 6/B 6n (links to the A 14 Halle/Leipzig−Magdeburg and to Goslar and Bad Harzburg).

== Notable people ==
- Frederick Rese (1791–1871), bishop of Detroit
- Christoph Gudermann (1798–1852), mathematician
- Werner Willikens (1893–1961), Nazi politician
- Fritz Deike (1913–1973), football player

== Town twinning ==
- Forres, Scotland, United Kingdom
