= Siegfried II of Querfurt =

Siegfried II of Querfurt (mid 13th century – 5 May 1310) was the Prince-Bishop of Hildesheim from 1279 to 1310.

== Biography ==
Siegfried was born to a noble family from the city Querfurt (which now belongs to Saxony-Anhalt).

He was head of the chapter at the Cathedral of Magdeburg before he was appointed as bishop on 18 July 1279.

He founded the medieval commune of Gronau. This was one part of his defense strategy of the Prince-Bishopric of Hildesheim that he was head of in his role as prince-bishop. Two other parts of this strategy were that he ordered to build a castle in Liebenburg and another one in Ruthe (which now belongs to the municipality of Sarstedt). Both castles were destroyed in the centuries thereafter. In 1302 he bought a castle in Westerhof (which now belongs to the municipality of Kalefeld). In 1310 he bought the County of Dassel in order to enlarge his prince-bishopric.

The dukes of Brunswick and Lunenburg were his major opponents. Additionally, the citizens of Hildesheim attempted to gain independence while he was prince-bishop.

Siegfried of Querfurt House of Querfurt Born: mid-13th century Died: 5 May 1310
Catholic Church titles
Regnal titles
Preceded by Otto I	Prince-Bishop of Hildesheim; 1279–1310	Succeeded by Henry II
