= Salzgitter-Bad =

Quarter of Salzgitter, Lower Saxony, Germany

Coordinates: 52°03′N 10°22′E

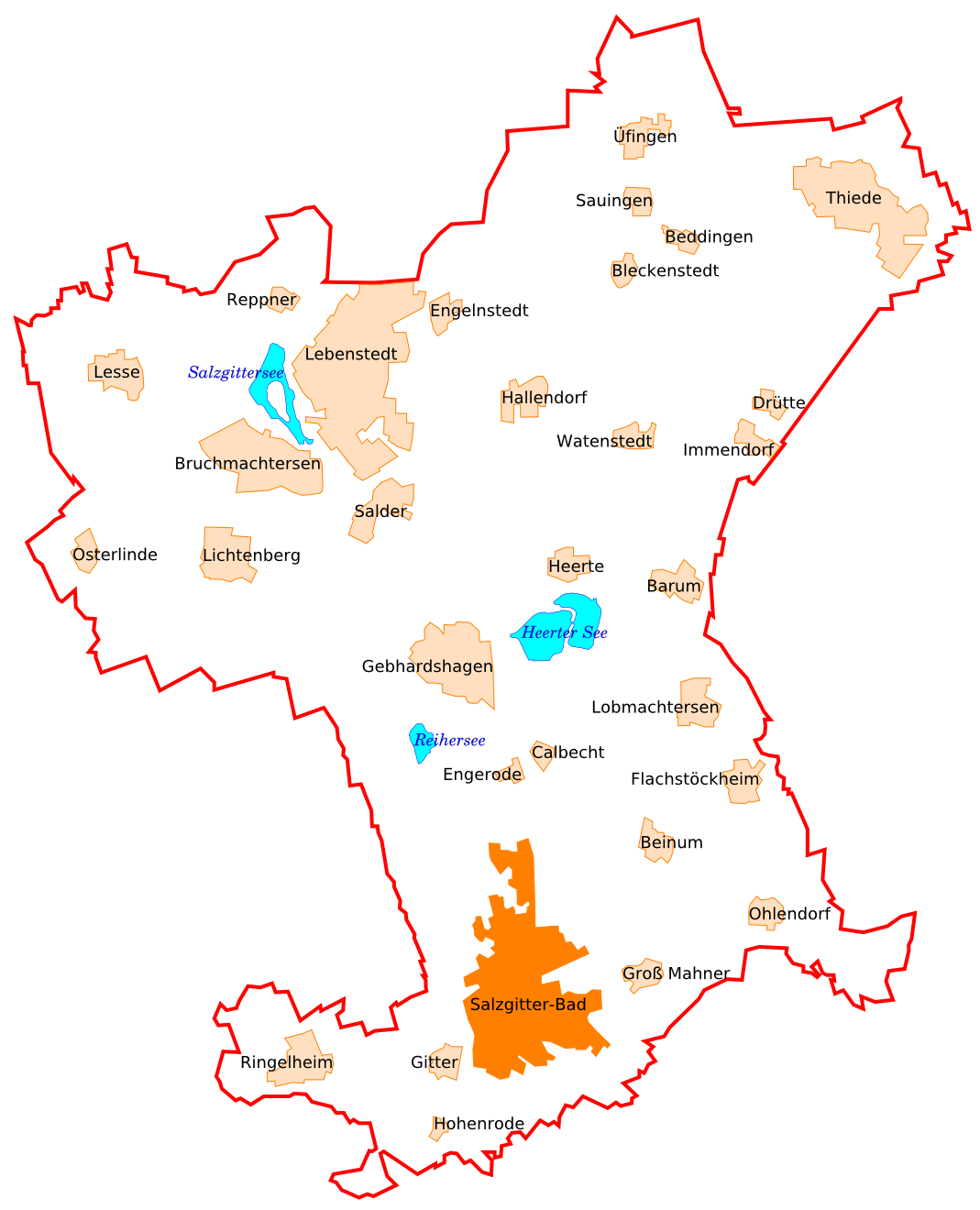
Position of Salzgitter-Bad

With a population of about 20,000, Salzgitter-Bad is the second biggest quarter of the German city Salzgitter in Lower Saxony. Salzgitter's name derives from it; the quarter is regarded as the historical and cultural centre of Salzgitter.

== History ==
Today's quarter Salzgitter-Bad was called "Salzgitter" until 1951 when the city "Watenstedt-Salzgitter" was renamed into "Salzgitter". In 1929, that original Salzgitter was chartered. Until 1942 when the City of Salzgitter was formed, it belonged to the then Landkreis Goslar being a small town. More information about its history can be found at Salzgitter.

== Population development ==
ca. 650 (1539), 1550 (around 1790), 1481 (1823), 1778 (1885), 2000 (1905), 2190 (1925), 3500 (1937), ca. 23 000 (2005), ca. 20 800 (2015).

== Commerce and infrastructure ==
Being close to Goslar, Braunschweig and Hildesheim, Salzgitter-Bad shows increasing infrastructure decline. The number of cinemas, bars and discos has declined throughout the decades. There is neither an outdoor pool any more nor a department store. Instead there have appeared some shopping centres and super markets on the area of the former goods station that fill the gap of consumer goods which was left after the closing of the department store. However, the concentration of purchasing power outside the pedestrian zone is leading to more and more shops leaving the latter. Some authorities of Salzgitter are located at Salzgitter-Bad at the Small Townhall, where there is also the Public Library of Salzgitter-Bad. Moreover, the city's archive is settled at Salzgitter-Bad.

Salzgitter-Bad is home to Salzgitter Maschinenbau AG (SMAG) which employs approximately 900 employees located in Salzgitter-Bad, Döbeln and Shanghai. The revenue in the fiscal year 2006/2007 was approximately €100 million. The company manufactures grabs for ports, antenna supports for military and civilian applications and mining equipment.

== Traffic ==
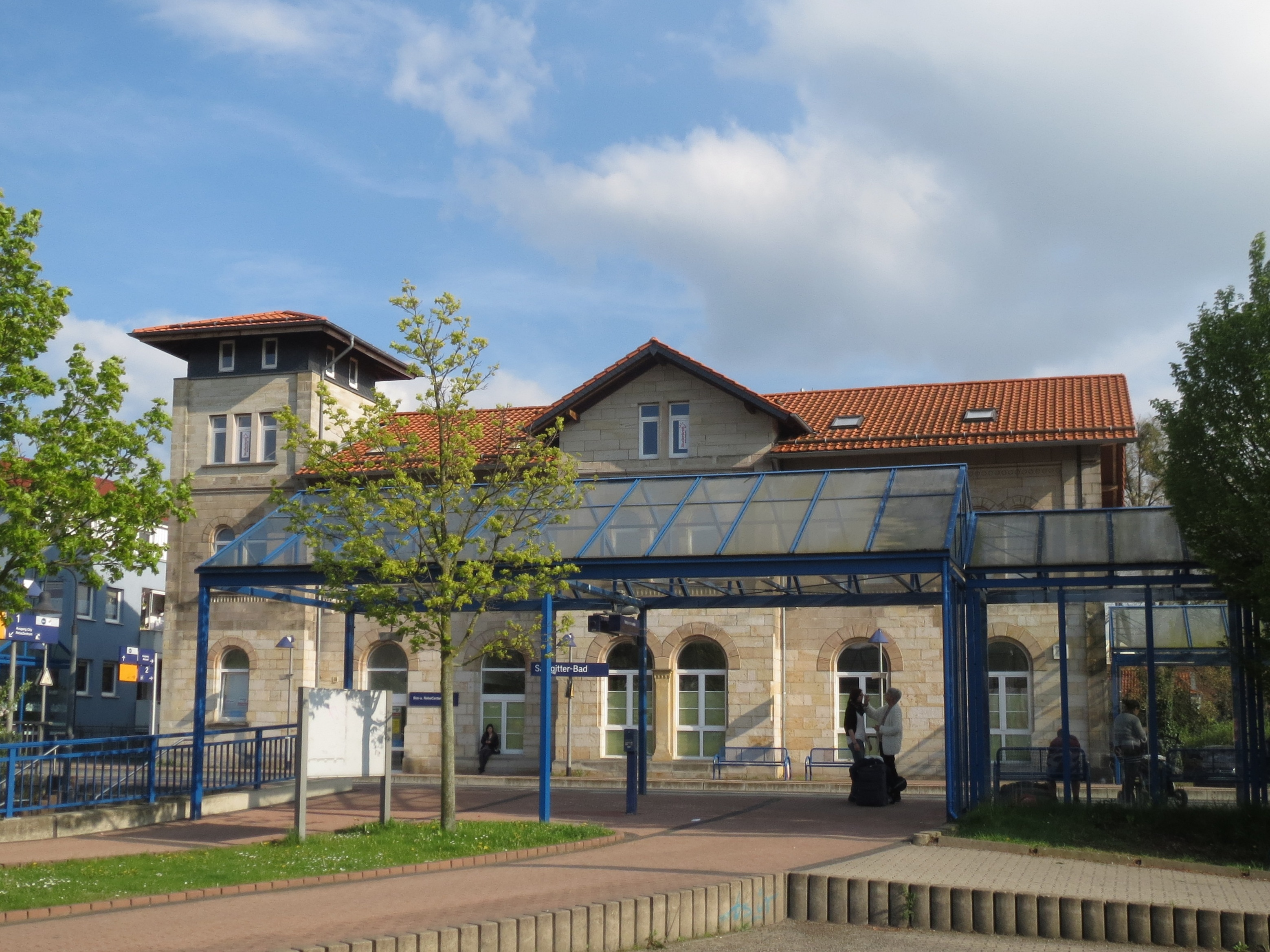
Railway-Station of Salzgitter-Bad

=== Railway ===
Salzgitter-Bad is part of the Göttingen/Herzberg - Braunschweig railway line. The historical station building is a listed building. Surrounded by a forecourt designed elaborately, the station is located at the rim of the Altstadt. Earlier, there was another line, which is now a historic railway run for commercial reasons. Furthermore, there is a goods traffic line to the steel works in the North of Salzgitter. The economical importance of the station of Salzgitter-Bad is little, though. The goods station has been transformed into a shopping park (see under "Commerce and Infrastructure").

=== Bus ===
While earlier the railway connected the quarters of Salzgitter, especially the rural ones, nowadays this is done by buses. Salzgitter-Bad has an interior bus network; apart from this you can reach the other quarters, for example the administrative and commercial centre of Salzgitter in Salzgitter-Lebenstedt, but also other cities such as Braunschweig and Goslar.

=== Road ===
There is no autobahn at Salzgitter-Bad. The nearest ones are the A7, which can be reached in the west, and the A39, which is in the northern part of Salzgitter. Minor highways B6 and B248 lead through Salzgitter-Bad. The quarter is connected to Salzgitter-Lebenstedt by a two-lane minor highway.

== Tourism ==
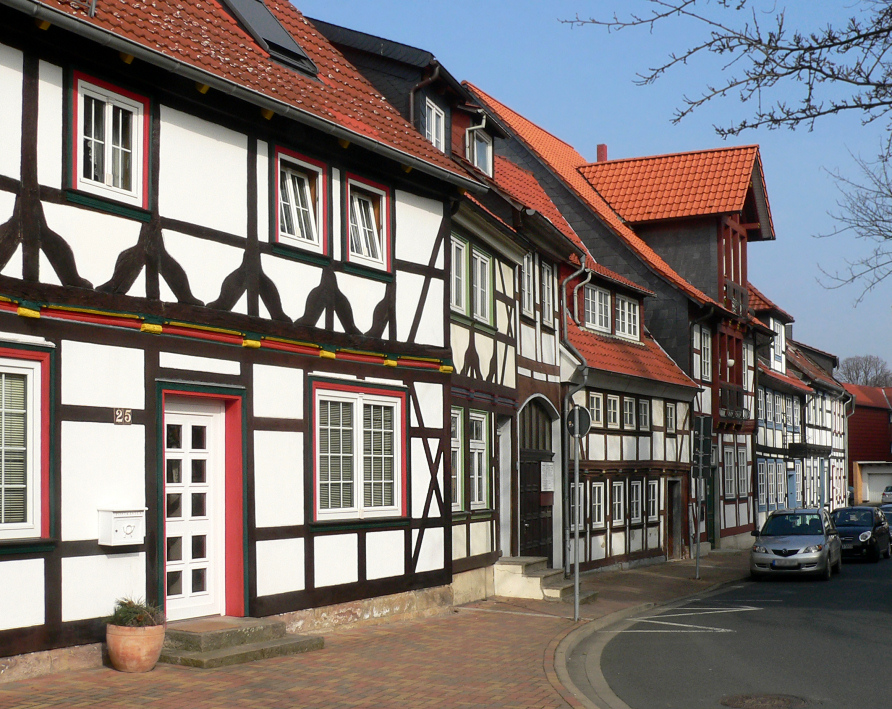
Altstadt of Salzgitter-Bad

Salzgitter-Bad is a registered spa with a brine bath in the Southern East. Earlier the bath was in the Altstadt near the historical saline, which had been discovered in the 7th century. There are Tennis, Golf, Equitation and other sport facilities that reveal Salzgitter-Bad's earlier importance as health resort and recreation locality close to the Harz mountains. By now, the promotion of tourism has faded; instead the City of Salzgitter tries to promote the entire city in terms of tourism.

== Education ==
There are four primary schools and one combined primary school and Hauptschule. Moreover, there are one Gymnasium, one Realschule, one Hauptschule and one special school, since schools have been united in 2005 following Lower-Saxony's school reform.

== Event ==
Every summer, Salzgitter-Bad celebrates the "Altstadt Festival" organised by various local businesses. For three days this street party offers foods and drinks, accessories, art, handcraft and a lot of activities by the associations and churches. On the public squares, there are music performances.

== See also ==
- Salzgitter-Ringelheim
- Innerste
- Harz
