= Hocheppan Castle =

- Castel d'Appiano
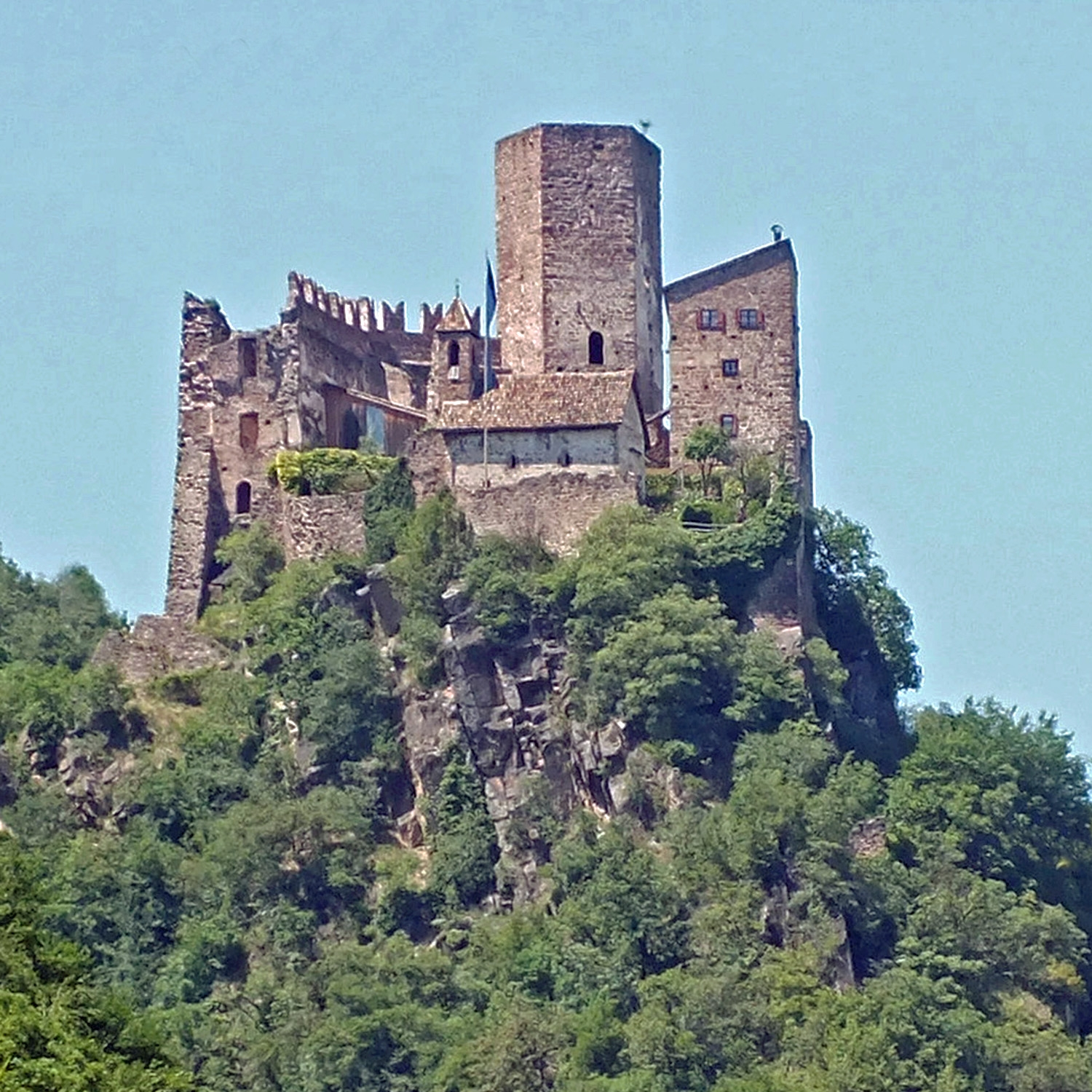
- Hocheppan Castle from the southwest

Site information
- Type: hill castle
- Code: IT-BZ
- Condition: largely preserved

Location
- Location within Italy
- Coordinates: 46°29′34″N 11°14′32″E

Site history
- Built: around 1125

Hocheppan Castle (German: Burg Hocheppan) lies on the territory of the frazione of Missian in the municipality of Eppan near Bozen in South Tyrol (Italy). Hocheppan is one of the most important fortifications in South Tyrol.

== Location ==
The medieval hill castle stands on precipitous crags above Missian.

== History ==
Some South Tyrolean castle scholars believe the castle hill was already settled and fortified in the Rhaetian period. Actually, the first mention of the castle dates back to 1211 (in castro de Epan).

According to one theory, Hocheppan Castle was built around 1125 by Count Ulrich II of Eppan as a stronghold (Trutzburg). Other researchers believe a later construction date is more probable.

The former seat of the counts of Eppan near the village of St. Pauls had become unsafe due to conflicts with the counts of Tyrol. Where it was, exactly, is not known, but in any case the Altenburg ("Old Castle") in Eppan is not the predecessor of Hocheppan.

In 1158, after the Eppans had ambushed a Papal delegation, the castle was destroyed in a punitive expedition under Henry the Lion, but was then rebuilt. In 1315, it was transferred to the princes of Tyrol, who subsequently enfeoffed it to various families. In 1834, Emperor Francis I enfeoffed the castle to Martin Teimer von Wildau. Since 1911 the counts of Enzenberg have owned Hocheppan.

Meanwhile, the structure of the castle has been consolidated and, in places, restored. The site is home to a snack bar today.

== Description ==
=== Hocheppan Castle ===
Access to the castle, which was extended over the centuries, is from the north through a complex system of outworks, guarded by battery towers, from the late Middle Ages, much of which dates to the 16th century. Outside the actual enceinte, an open roundel, which could be defended with firearms, guards the site. Dominating the castle is the high pentagonal bergfried, a shape which is rare in the Tyrol, whose condition is endangered by a deep fissure in the masonry.

=== Castle chapel ===
The frescoes in the castle chapel are some of the best preserved in Tyrol. On the inner and outer walls scenes from the life of Jesus and the apostles are depicted as well as other Biblical scenes, such as the Parable of the Wise and Foolish Virgins.

=== Chalk Tower ===
About ten minutes walk from Hocheppan is the Chalk Tower (Kreidenturm), a separates outwork of the castle. It consists of a very high, white, limed tower that is probably still at its original height. It is surrounded by a small chemise.

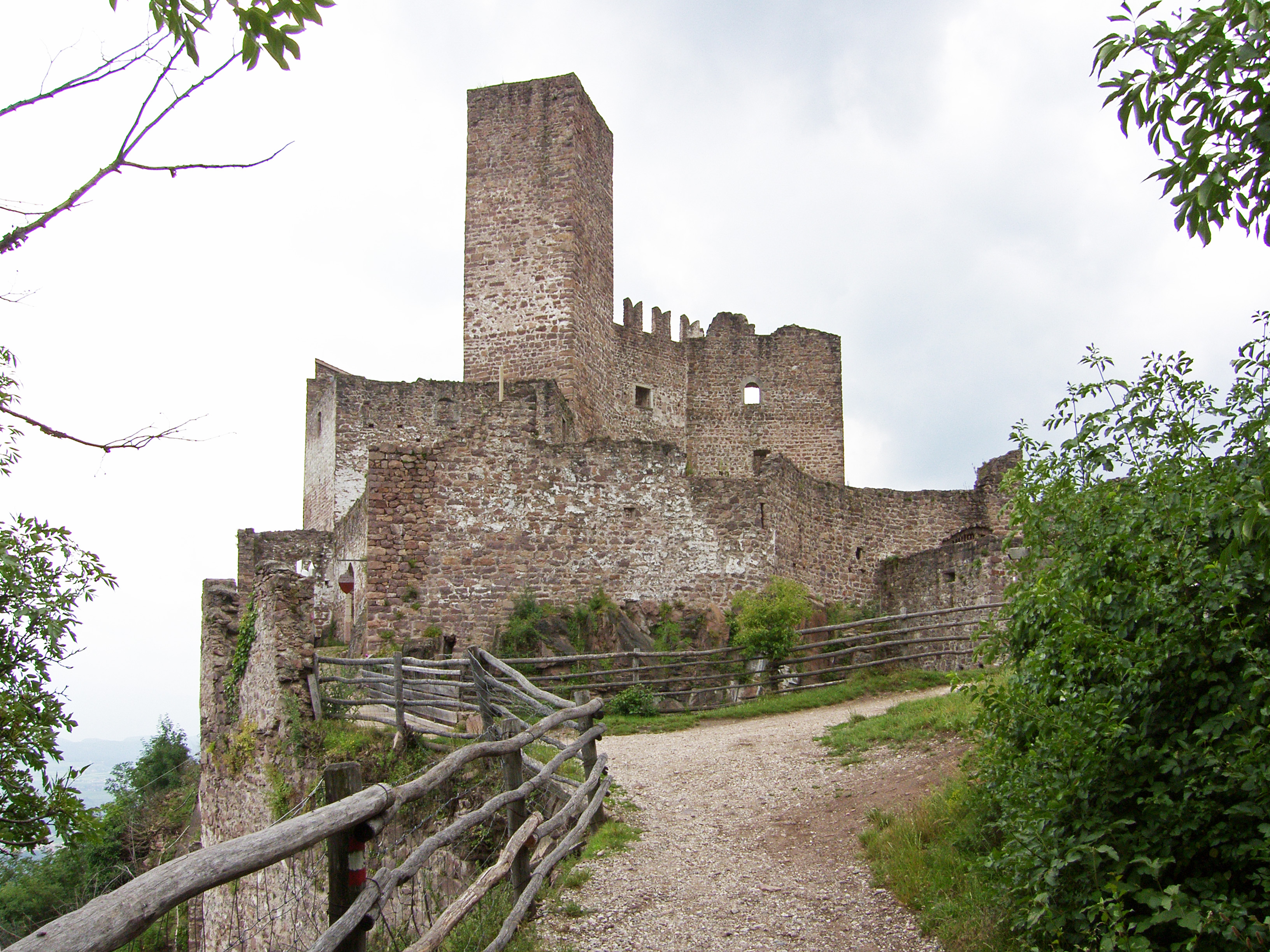
The entrance side

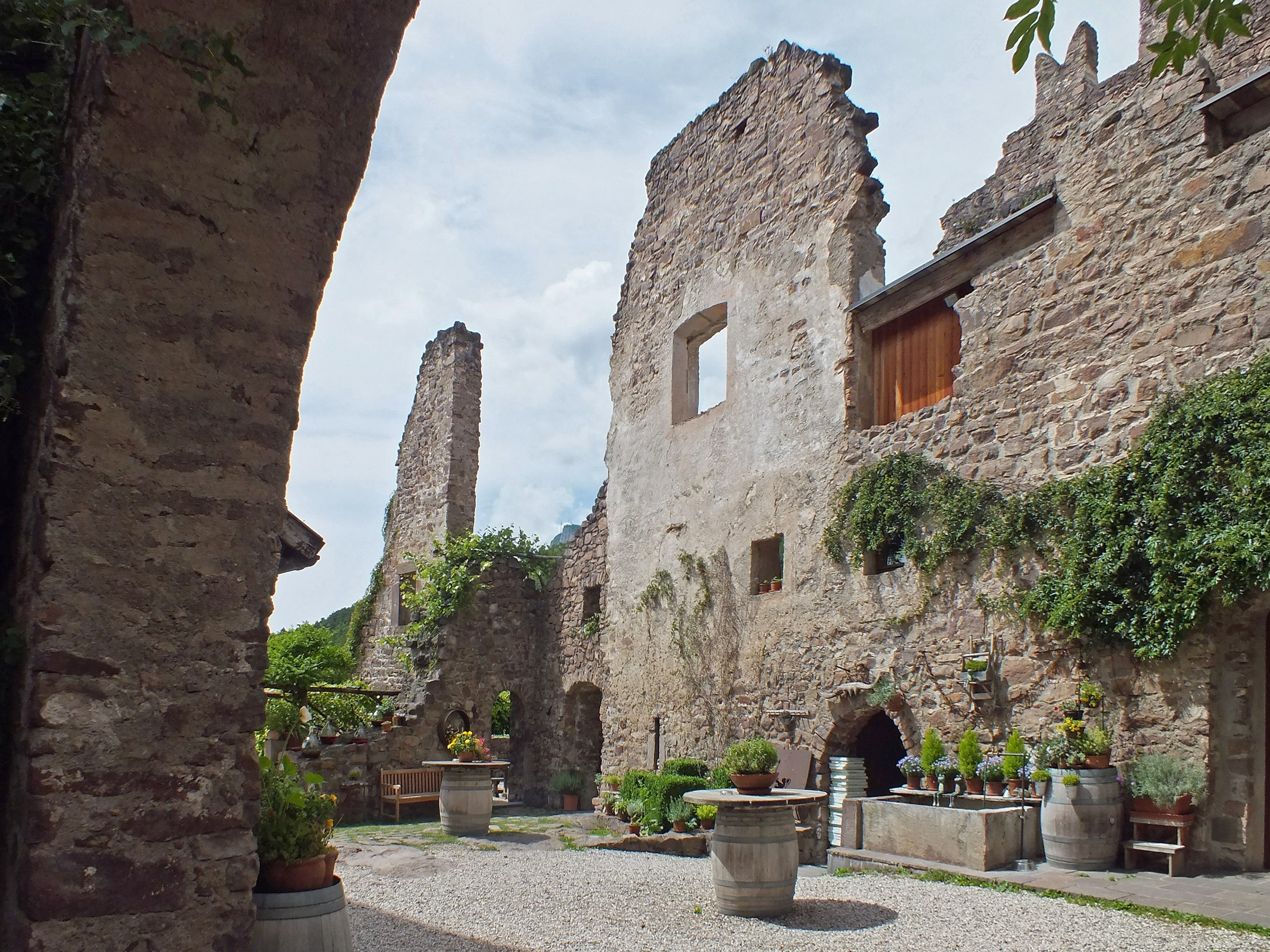
In the castle courtyard

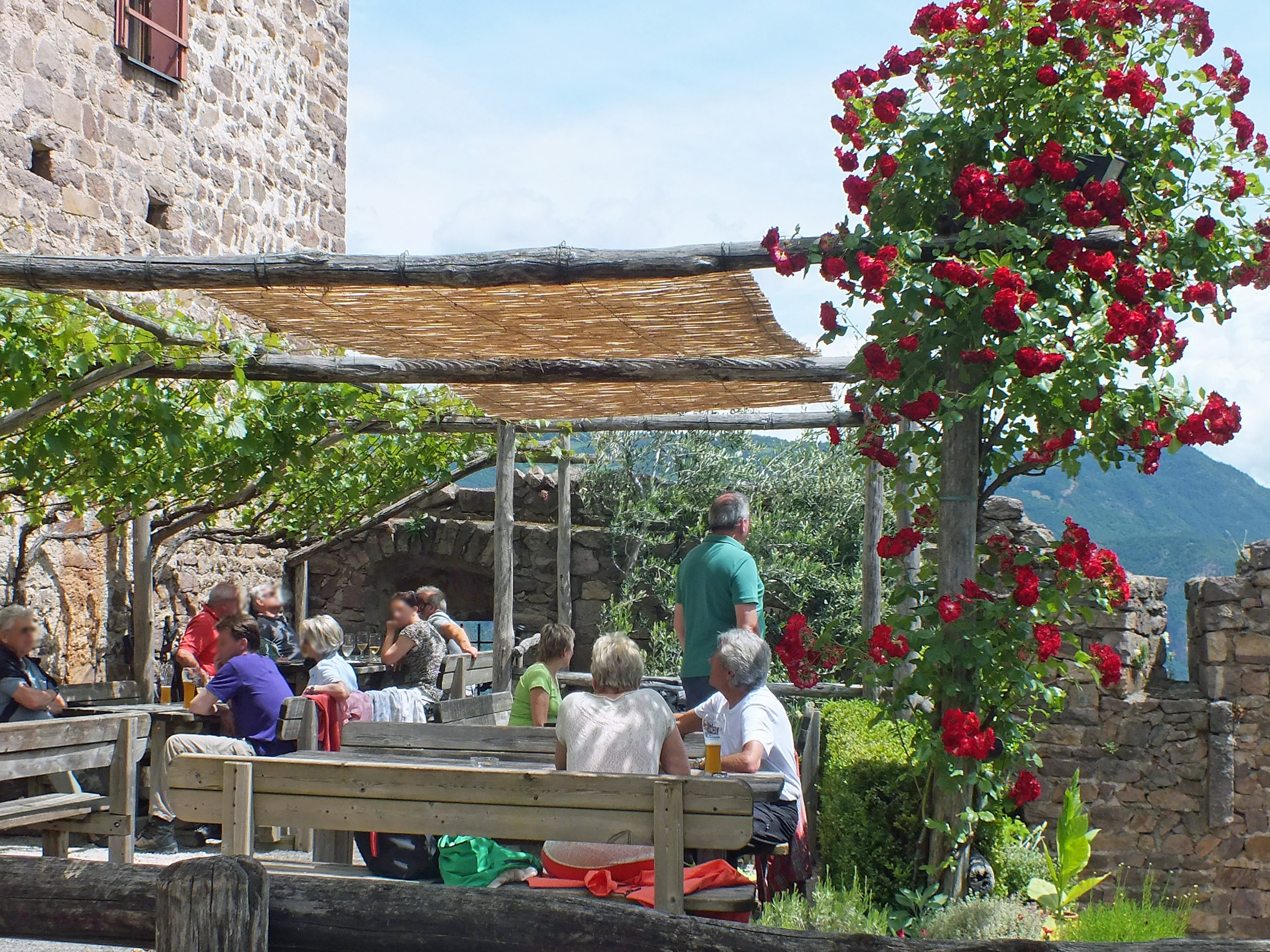
Outdoor seating at the café

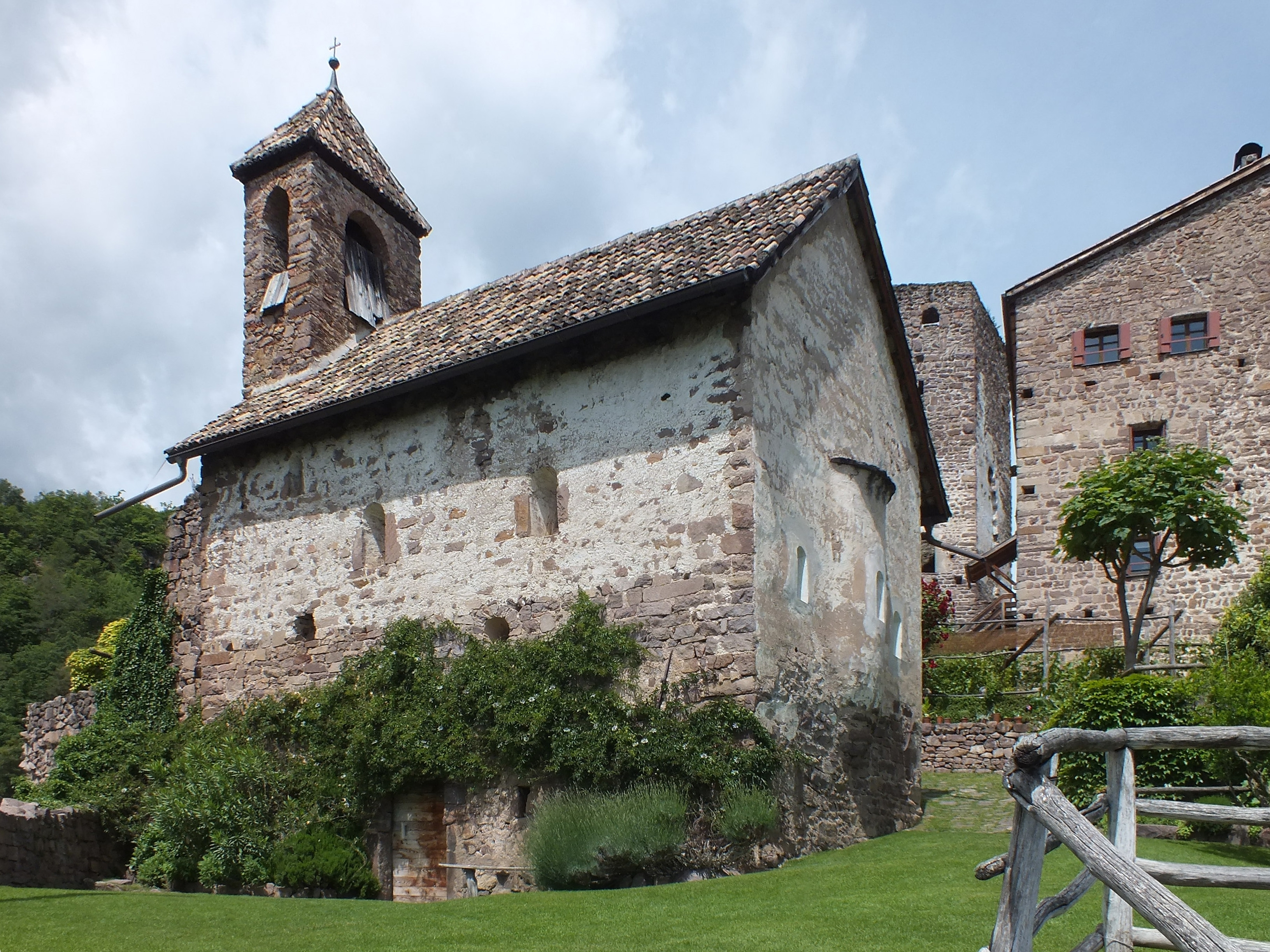
The castle chapel

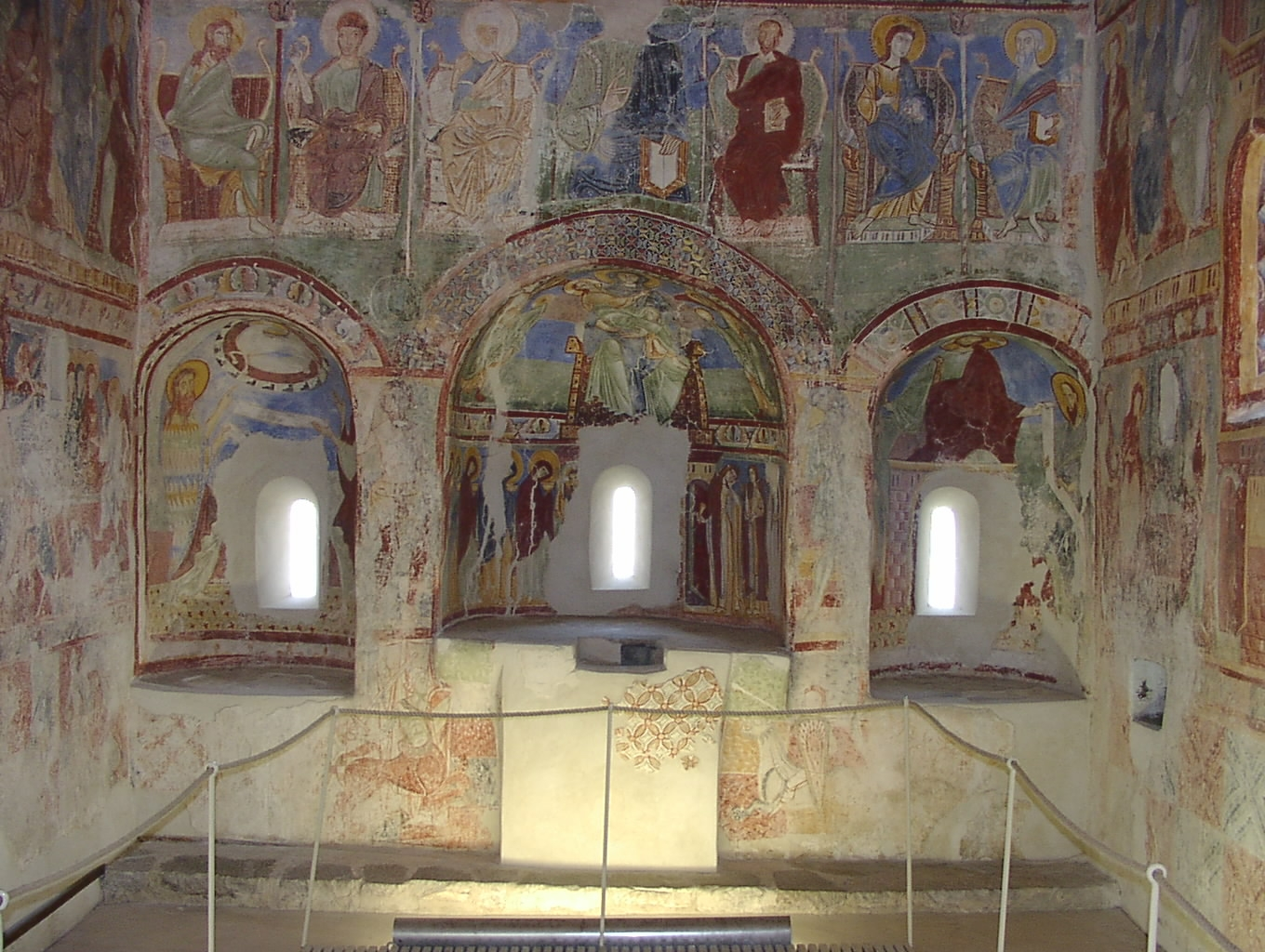
Frescoes in the chapel

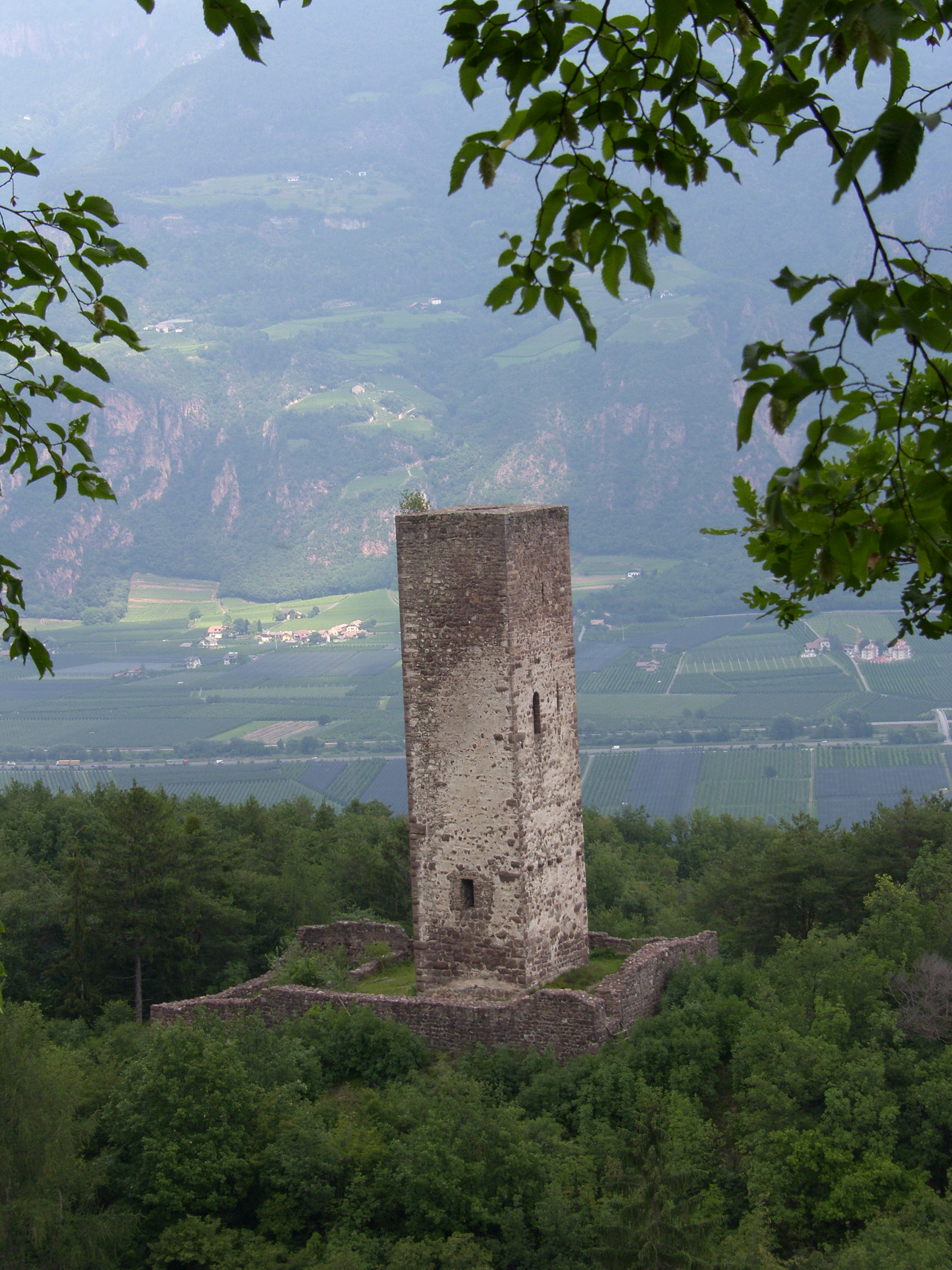
The Chalk Tower

== Literature ==
- Martin Bitschnau (1983). Burg und Adel in Tirol zwischen 1050 und 1350. Grundlagen zu ihrer Erforschung (= Sitzungsberichte ÖAW. 403). Österreichische Akademie der Wissenschaften, Vienna 1983, pp. 186–196, no. 169.
- Walter Landi, Helmut Stampfer, and Thomas Steppan (2011). Hocheppan: eine Grafenburg mit romanischen Kapellenfresken (= Burgen. 10). Schnell + Steiner, Regensburg, ISBN 978-3-7954-2383-4.
- Johann Nothdurfter (2001). Burgkapelle Hocheppan: Beobachtungen zu spätantiker Herkunft und vorburgenzeitlicher Bebauung. In: Arx, 23, pp. 14–18.
- Helmut Stampfer and Thomas Steppan (1998). Die Burgkapelle von Hocheppan. Athesia, Bozen, ISBN 978-8-8701-4957-9.
