= Goslar =

Place in Lower Saxony, Germany

- Town
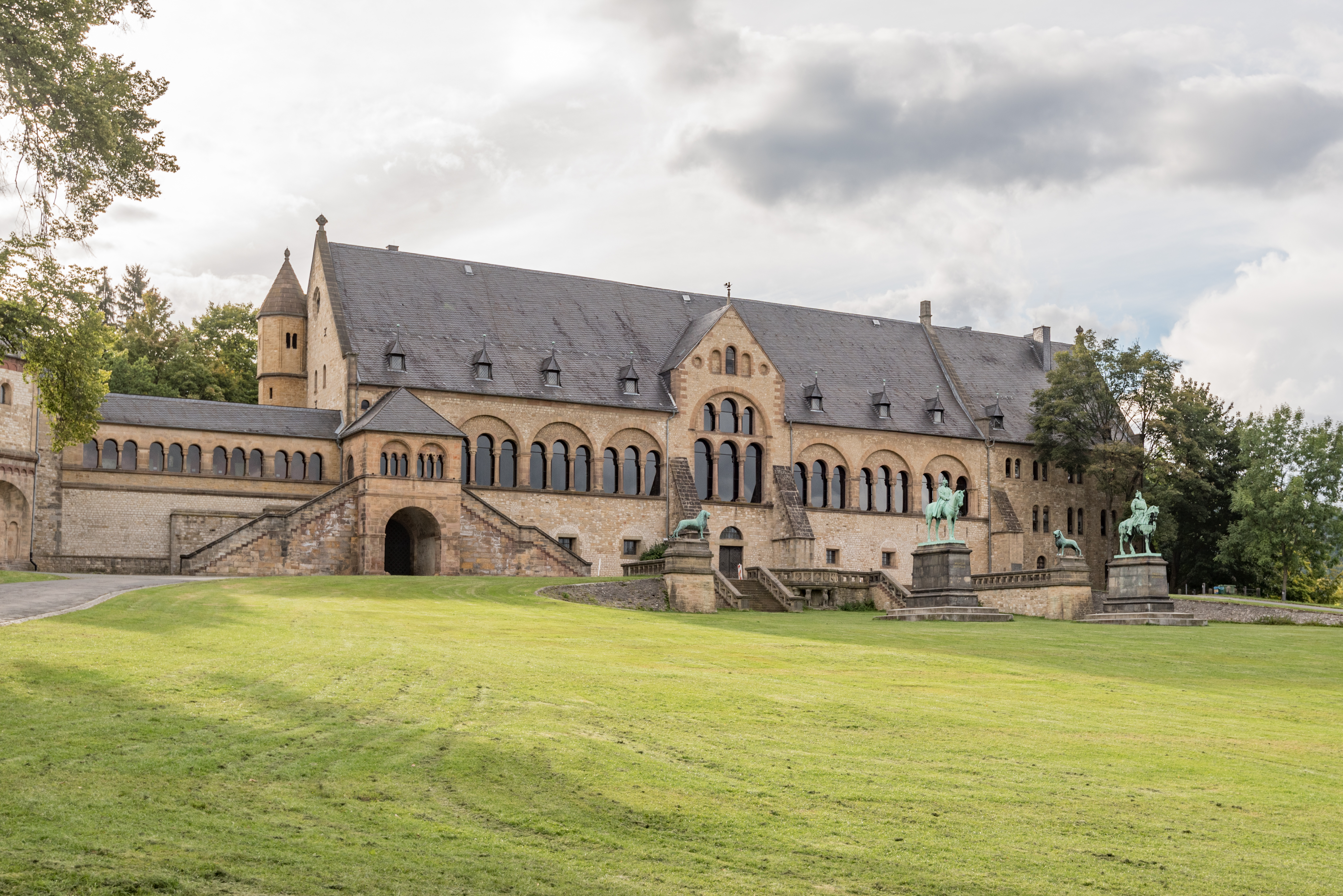
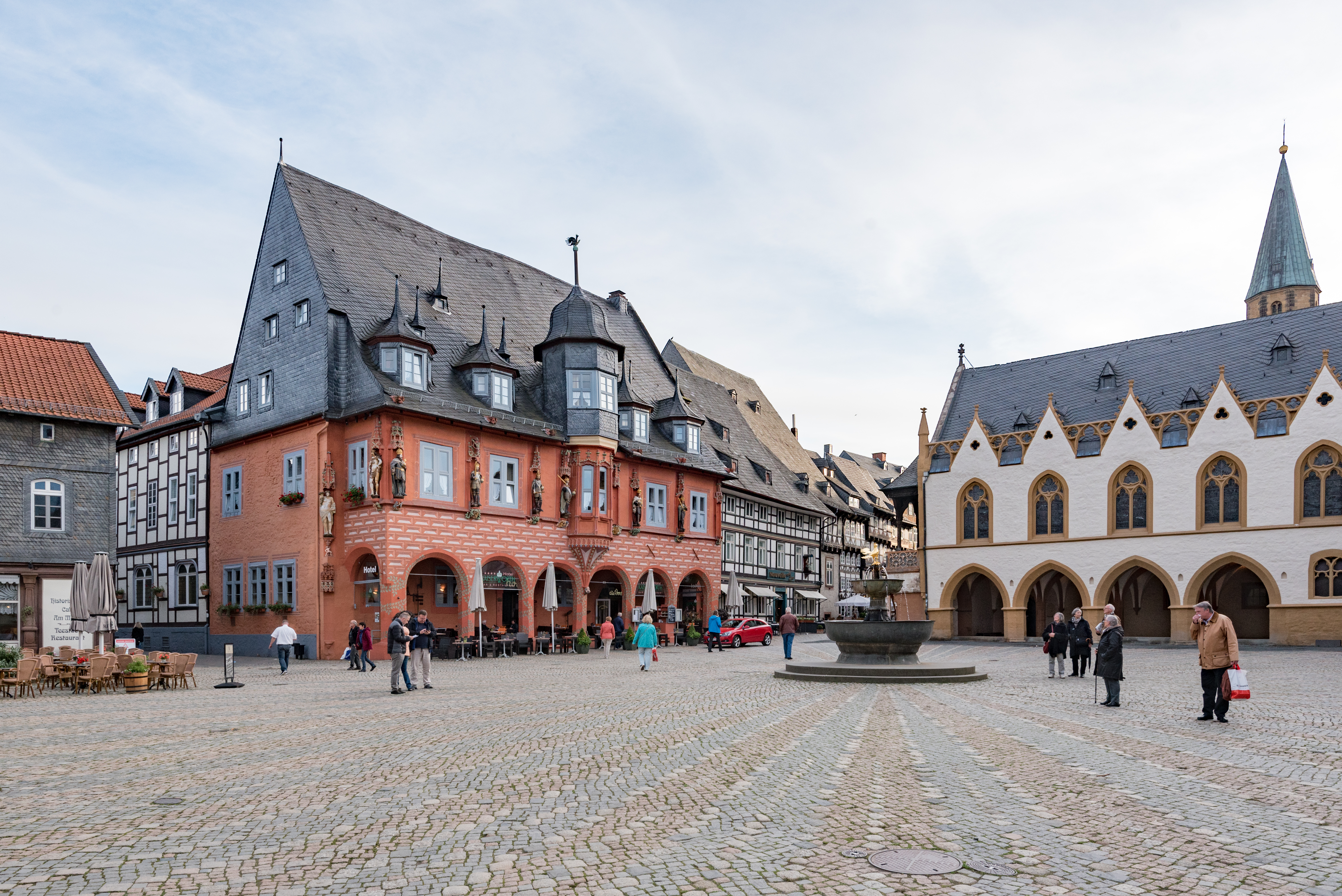
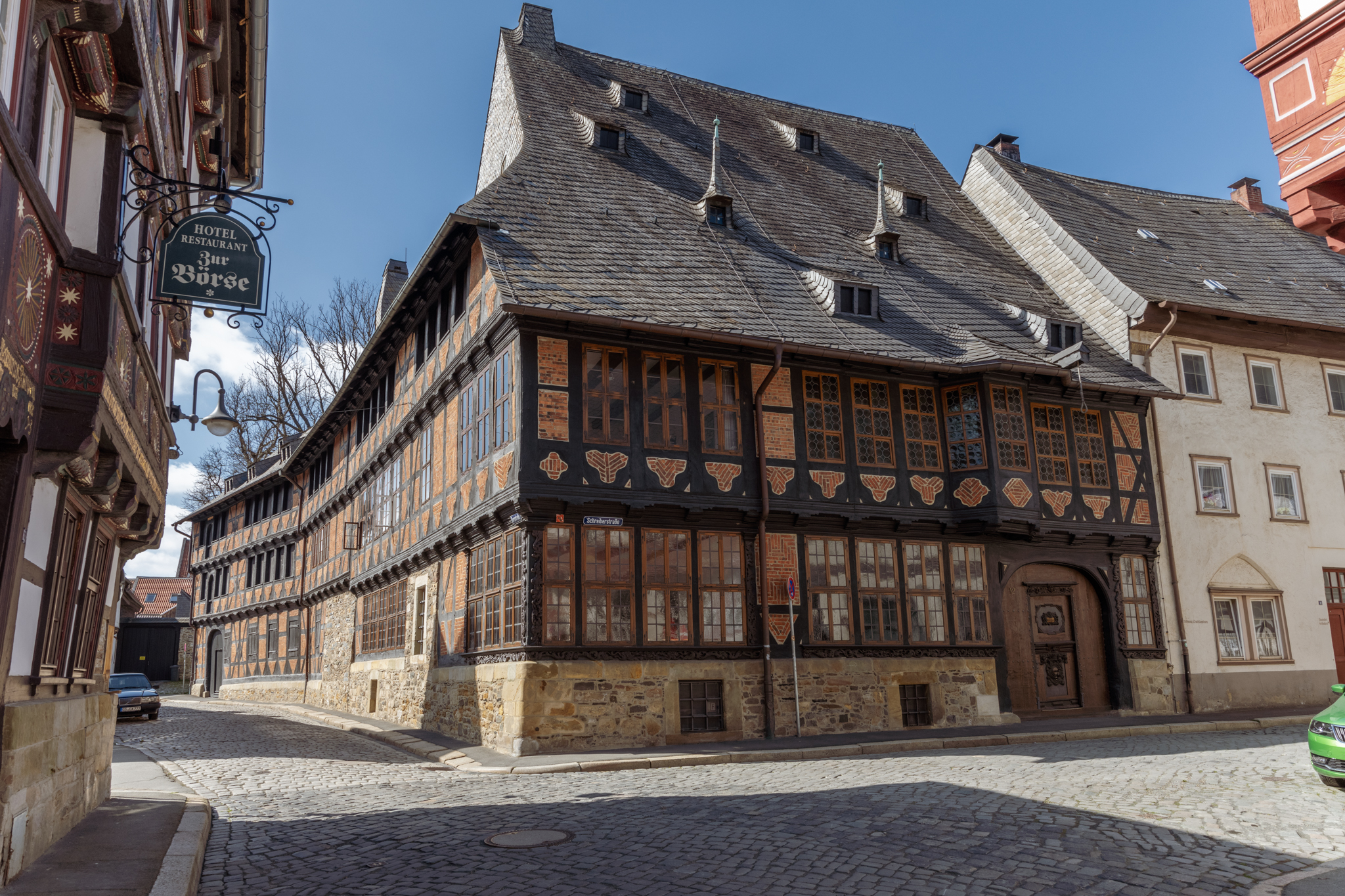
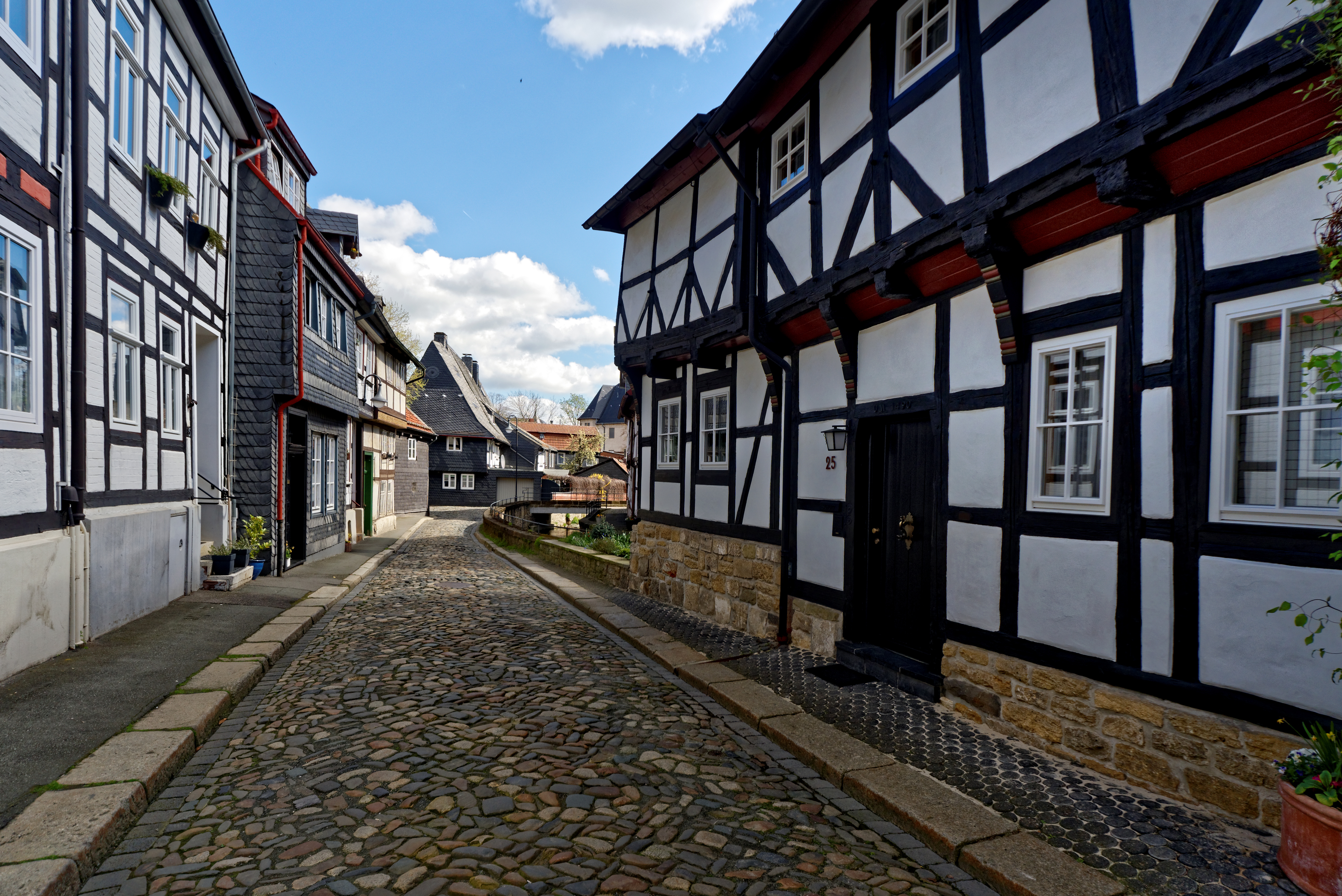
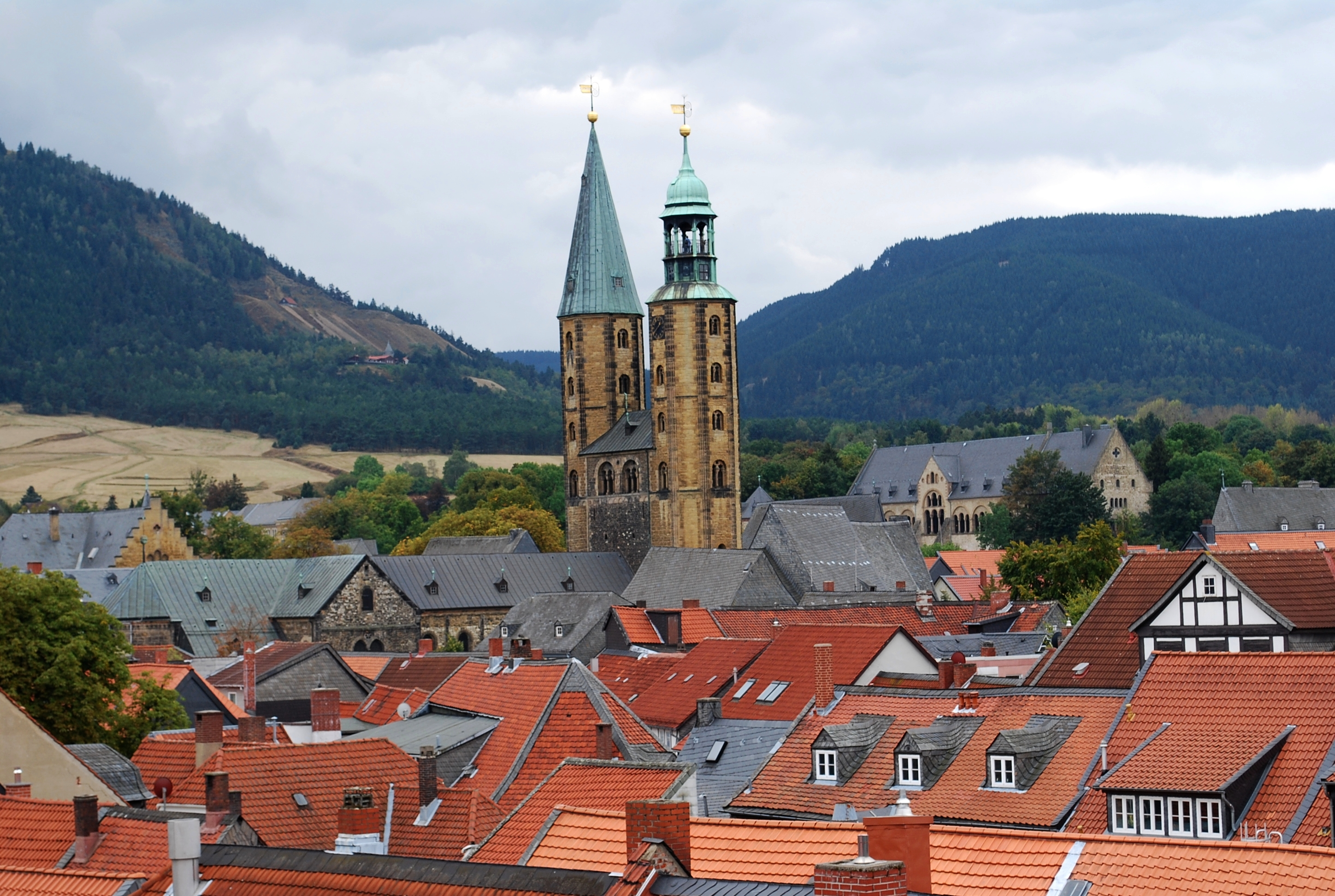
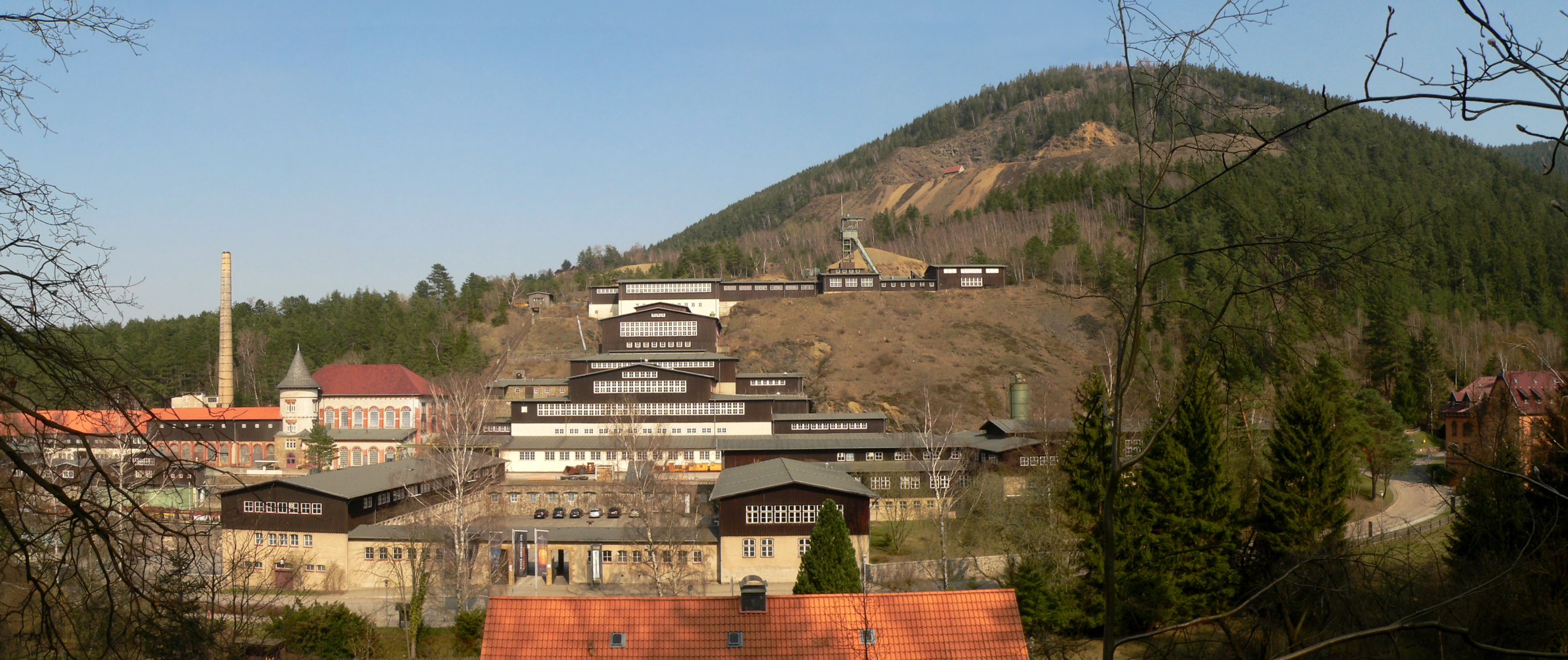
- Clockwise from top: Imperial Palace of Goslar, the Siemenshaus, Market church of Sts. Cosmas and Damian, Rammelsberg, half-timbered houses in the Old Town and the market square with the old town hall and the Kaiserworth

- Flag Coat of arms

- Location of Goslar within Goslar district
- Interactive map of Goslar
- Location within Germany Location within Lower Saxony
- Coordinates: 51°54′26″N 10°25′48″E
- Country: Germany
- State: Lower Saxony
- District: Goslar
- Subdivisions: 18 districts

Government
  - Mayor (2021–26): Urte Schwerdtner (SPD)

Area
  - Total: 163.88 km^{2} (63.27 sq mi)
- Elevation: 255 m (837 ft)

Population (2025-12-31)
  - Total: 47,454
  - Density: 289.57/km^{2} (749.97/sq mi)
- Time zone: UTC+01:00 (CET)
  - Summer (DST): UTC+02:00 (CEST)
- Postal codes: 38640, 38642, 38644
- Dialling codes: 05321, 05325
- Vehicle registration: GS
- Website: www.goslar.de

Goslar
UNESCO World Heritage Site
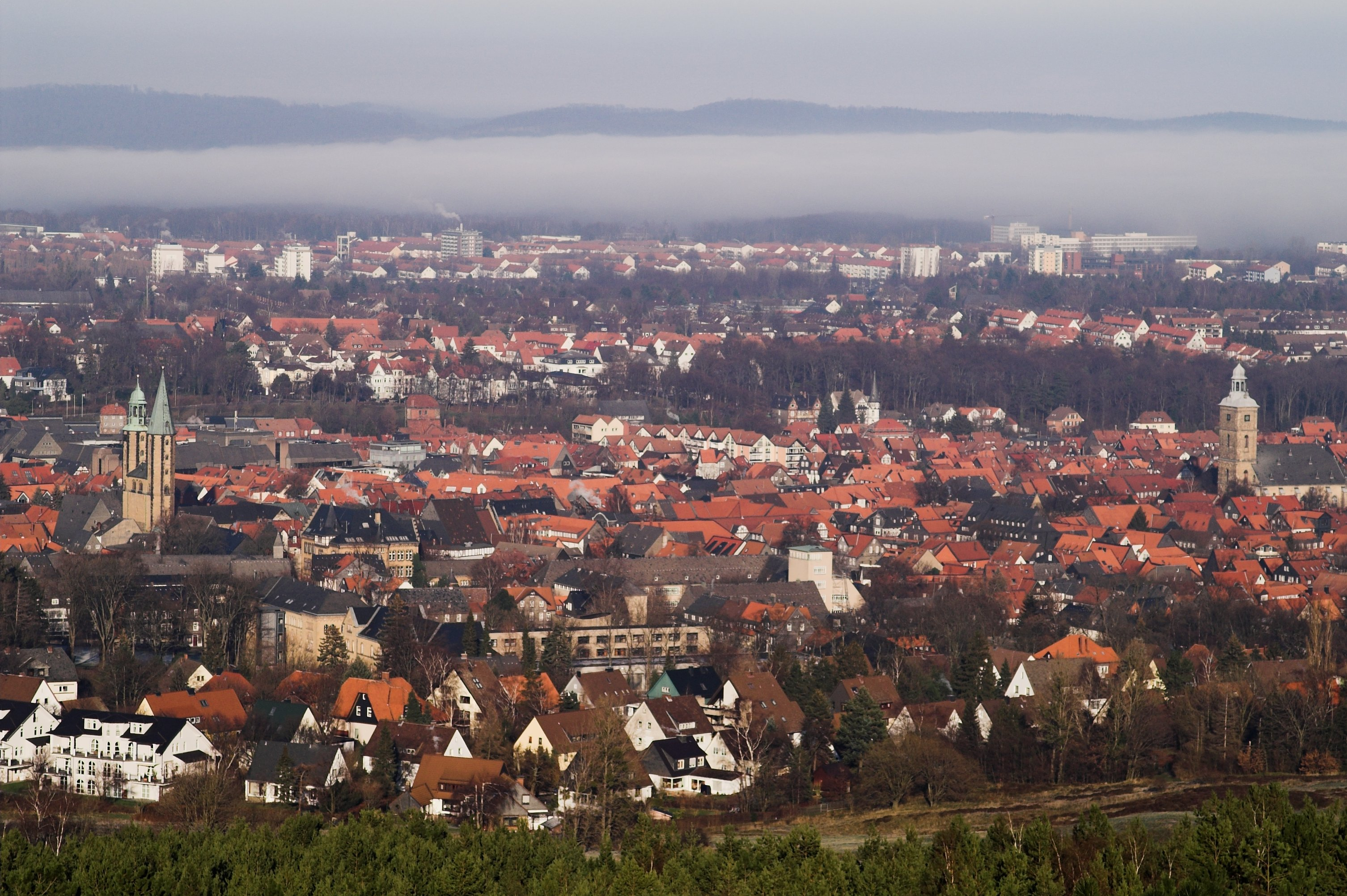
- View to the North with the Hildesheim downs in the background. Photograph taken from the Maltermeister Tower
- Interactive map of Goslar
- Part of: Mines of Rammelsberg, Historic Town of Goslar and Upper Harz Water Management System
- Criteria: Cultural: i, iv
- Reference: 623-001
- Inscription: 1992 (16th Session)
- Extensions: 2010
- Area: 363.3 ha (898 acres)
- Buffer zone: 376.1 ha (929 acres)

Goslar (German pronunciation: [ˈɡɔslaʁ]; Eastphalian: Goslär) is a historic town in Lower Saxony, Germany. It is the administrative centre of the district of Goslar and is located on the northwestern slopes of the Harz mountain range. The Old Town of Goslar with over 1,500 timber houses and the Mines of Rammelsberg are UNESCO World Heritage Sites for their millennium-long testimony to the history of ore mining and their political importance for the Holy Roman Empire and Hanseatic League. Each year, Goslar awards the Kaiserring to an international artist, called the "Nobel Prize" of the art world.

== Geography ==
Goslar is situated in the middle of the upper half of Germany, about 40 kilometres (25 miles) south of Brunswick and about 70 km (43 mi) southeast of the state capital, Hanover. The Schalke mountain is the highest elevation within the municipal boundaries at 762 metres (2,500 feet). The lowest point of 175 m (574 ft) is near the Oker river. Geographically, Goslar forms the boundary between the Hildesheim Börde which is part of the Northern German Plain, and the Harz range, which is the highest, northernmost extension of Germany's Central Uplands. The Hildesheim Börde is characterised by plains with rich clay soils – used agriculturally for sugar beet farming – interlaced with several hill ranges commonly known as the Hildesheim Forest and Salzgitter Hills. In the northeast the Harly Forest stretches down to the River Oker, in the east, Goslar borders on the German state of Saxony-Anhalt.

Immediately to the south the Harz range rises above the historic borough at a height of 636 m (2,087 ft) at Mt Rammelsberg. Extended forests dominate the landscape. The major rivers crossing the municipal boundaries are the Oker with its Gose/Abzucht and Radau tributaries. The eponymic River Gose originates approximately 9 kilometres (6 miles) south-west of Goslar at the Auerhahn Pass (638 m (2,093 ft)) east of the Bocksberg mountain. At the northern foot of the Herzberg (632 m (2,073 ft)) it meets the smaller Abzucht before it flows into the Oker. The Dörpke and Gelmke also flow from the Harz foothills to the south into the Goslar municipal area, where they discharge into the Abzucht.

=== Neighbouring municipalities ===
(Clockwise from the north): Liebenburg, Schladen-Werla (Wolfenbüttel District), Osterwieck (Harz District, Saxony-Anhalt), Bad Harzburg, Clausthal-Zellerfeld (Oberharz), and Langelsheim.

=== Town districts ===
The town currently consists of 18 districts (Stadtteile):

- Old Town (upper and lower borough and town centre)
- Rammelsberg with Siemensviertel and Rosenberg
- Georgenberg with Kattenberg
- Steinberg
- Sudmerberg
- Jürgenohl with Kramerswinkel
- Baßgeige
- Ohlhof

Incorporated in 1972:

- Hahndorf with Grauhof
- Hahnenklee with Bockswiese
- Jerstedt
- Oker

Incorporated in 2014:

- Immenrode
- Lengde
- Lochtum
- Vienenburg with Wöltingerode and Wennerode
- Weddingen
- Wiedelah

=== Climate ===
Climate data for Goslar, Niedersachsen
| Month | Jan | Feb | Mar | Apr | May | Jun | Jul | Aug | Sep | Oct | Nov | Dec | Year |
|---|---|---|---|---|---|---|---|---|---|---|---|---|---|
| Mean daily maximum °C (°F) | 2 (36) | 2 (36) | 7 (45) | 10 (50) | 16 (61) | 18 (64) | 21 (70) | 21 (70) | 17 (63) | 13 (55) | 7 (45) | 4 (39) | 11.5 (52.7) |
| Mean daily minimum °C (°F) | −2 (28) | −3 (27) | 1 (34) | 3 (37) | 7 (45) | 11 (52) | 12 (54) | 12 (54) | 10 (50) | 6 (43) | 2 (36) | 0 (32) | 4.9 (40.8) |
Source: World Weather Online

== History ==
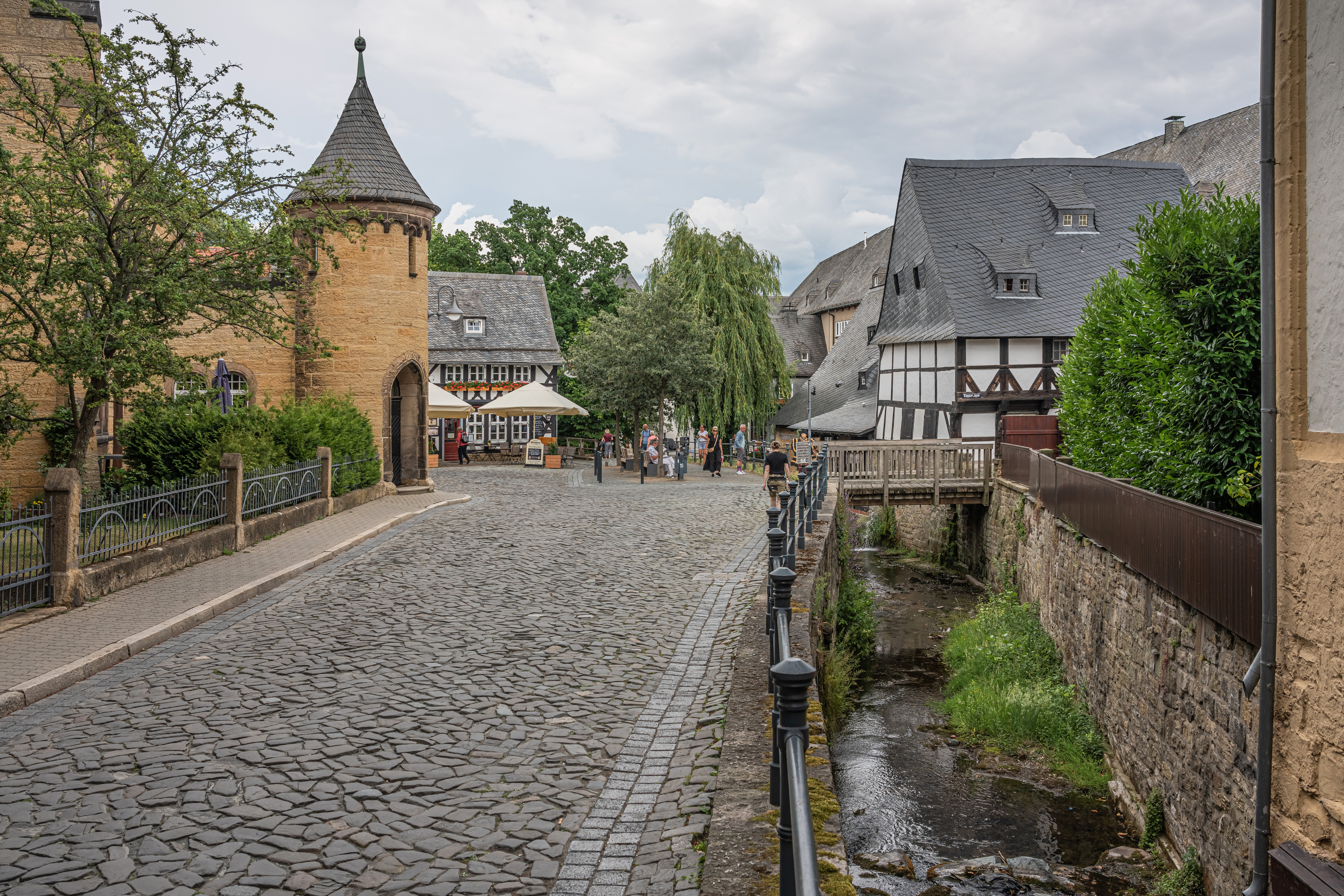
Abzucht river in the Old Town, showing a watermill (2022)

Iron ore mining has been common in the Harz region since Roman times; the earliest known evidence for quarrying and smelting is from the 3rd century AD. Ancient burial objects made of Harz ore have even been discovered during excavations in England. The settlement on the Gose creek was first mentioned in a 979 deed issued by Emperor Otto II; it was located in the Saxon homelands of the Ottonian dynasty and probably a royal palace (Königspfalz) already existed at the site. It became even more important when extensive silver deposits were discovered at the nearby Rammelsberg, today a mining museum. The name's toponymy probably comes shortened from "Goselager", of the stream "Gose" on the northern edge of the Harz Mountains, and Lager.

When Otto's descendant Henry II began to convene Imperial synods at the Goslar palace in 1009, Goslar gradually replaced the Royal palace of Werla as a central place of assembly in the Saxon lands, a development that was again enforced by the Salian (Franconian) emperors. Conrad II, once elected King of the Romans, celebrated Christmas 1024 in Goslar and had the foundations laid for the new Imperial Palace (Kaiserpfalz Goslar) the next year.

Goslar became the favourite residence of Conrad's son Henry III, who stayed at the palace about twenty times. Here he received King Peter of Hungary as well as the emissaries of Prince Yaroslav of Kiev and here he appointed bishops and dukes. His son and successor Henry IV was born here on 11 November 1050. Henry also had Goslar Cathedral erected and consecrated by Archbishop Herman of Cologne in 1051. Shortly before his death in 1056 Emperor Henry III met Pope Victor II in the church, emphasizing the union of secular and ecclesiastical power. His heart was buried in Goslar, his body in the Salian family vault in Speyer Cathedral. Of the cathedral only the northern porch survived; the main building was torn down in the early 19th century.

Under Henry IV Goslar remained a centre of Imperial rule. However conflicts intensified such as in the violent Precedence Dispute at Pentecost 1063. While Henry aimed at securing the enormous wealth deriving from the Rammlesberg silver mines as a royal demesne, the dissatisfaction of local nobles escalated with the Saxon revolt of 1073–1075. In the subsequent Saxon revolt of 1077–1088 the Goslar citizens sided with anti-king Rudolf of Rheinfelden, who held a princely assembly here in 1077, and with Hermann of Salm, who was crowned king in Goslar by Archbishop Siegfried of Mainz on 26 December 1081, giving Goslar the status of an Imperial City.

In Spring 1105 Henry V convened the Saxon estates at Goslar to gain support for the deposition of his father, Henry IV. Elected king in the following year, he held six Imperial Diets at the Goslar Palace during his rule. The tradition was adopted by his successor Lothair II and even by the Hohenstaufen rulers Conrad III and Frederick Barbarossa. After his election in 1152, King Frederick appointed the Welf duke Henry the Lion Imperial Vogt (bailiff) of the Goslar mines; nevertheless, the dissatisfied duke besieged the town and at an 1173 meeting in Chiavenna demanded his enfeoffment with the estates in turn for his support on Barbarossa's Italian campaigns. When Henry the Lion was finally declared deposed in 1180, he had the Rammelsberg mines devastated.

Goslar's importance as an Imperial residence began to decline under the rule of Barbarossa's descendants. During the German throne dispute the Welf king Otto IV laid siege to the town in 1198 but had to yield to the forces of his Hohenstaufen rival Philip of Swabia. Goslar was again stormed and plundered by Otto's troops in 1206. Frederick II held the last Imperial Diet here; with the Great Interregnum upon his death in 1250, Goslar's Imperial era ended.

While the Emperors withdraw from Northern Germany, civil liberties in Goslar were strengthened. Market rights date back to 1025 and a municipal council (Rat) was first mentioned in 1219. The citizens strove for control of the Rammelsberg silver mines and in 1267 joined the Hanseatic League. Besides mining in the Upper Harz, commerce and trade in Gose beer, later also slate and vitriol, became important. By 1290 the council had obtained Vogt rights, confirming Goslar's status as a free imperial city. In 1340 its citizens were vested with Heerschild rights by Emperor Louis the Bavarian. The Goslar town law set an example for numerous other municipalities, like the Goslar mining law codified in 1359.

Early modern times saw both a mining boom and rising conflicts with the Welf Dukes of Brunswick-Lüneburg, mainly with Prince Henry V of Wolfenbüttel who seized the Rammelsberg mines and extended Harz forests in 1527. Though a complaint was successfully lodged with the Reichskammergericht by the Goslar citizens, a subsequent gruelling feud with the duke lasted for decades. Goslar was temporarily placed under Imperial ban, while the Protestant Reformation was introduced in the city by theologian Nicolaus von Amsdorf who issued a first church constitution in 1531. To assert independence, the citizens in 1536 joined the Schmalkaldic League against the Catholic policies of the Habsburg emperor Charles V. The Schmalkaldic forces indeed occupied the Wolfenbüttel lands of Henry V, however, when they were defeated by Imperial forces at the 1547 Battle of Mühlberg, the Welf duke continued his reprisals.

In 1577 the Goslar citizens signed the Lutheran Formula of Concord. After years of continued skirmishes, they finally had to grant Duke Henry and his son Julius extensive mining rights which ultimately edged out the city council. Nevertheless, several attempts by the Brunswick dukes to incorporate the Imperial city were rejected. Goslar and its economy was hit hard by the Thirty Years' War, mainly by the Kipper und Wipper financial crisis in the 1620s which led to several revolts and pogroms. Facing renewed aggressions by Duke Christian the Younger of Brunswick, the citizens sought support from the Imperial military leaders Tilly and Wallenstein. The city was occupied by the Swedish forces of King Gustavus Adolphus from 1632 to 1635; in 1642 a peace agreement was reached between Emperor Ferdinand III and the Brunswick duke Augustus the Younger. The hopes of the Goslar citizens to regain the Rammelsberg mines were not fulfilled.

Goslar remained loyal to the Imperial authority, solemnly celebrating each accession of a Holy Roman Emperor. While strongly referring to its great medieval traditions, the city continuously decreased in importance and got into rising indebtedness. When Johann Wolfgang von Goethe stayed at Goslar in 1777, he called it "an Imperial city rotted in and with its privileges". In the winter of 1798, the coldest of the century, the young English poet William Wordsworth stayed in the city. To dispel homesickness he started to write a few verses about his childhood, which would eventually evolve into the masterpiece that was published in 13 volumes after his death as The Prelude.

First administrative reforms were enacted by councillors of the Siemens family. Nevertheless, the status of Imperial immediacy was finally lost, when Goslar was annexed by Prussian forces during the Napoleonic Wars in 1802, confirmed by the German Mediatisation the next year. Under Prussian rule, further reforms were pushed ahead by councillor Christian Wilhelm von Dohm. Temporarily part of the Kingdom of Westphalia upon the Prussian defeat at the 1806 Battle of Jena–Auerstedt, Goslar finally was assigned to the newly established Kingdom of Hanover by resolution of the Vienna Congress. The cathedral was sold and torn down from 1820 to 1822, bitterly mourned by Heinrich Heine in his Harzreise travelogue. Again under Prussian rule after the Austro-Prussian War of 1866, Goslar became a popular retirement residence (Pensionopolis) and a garrison town of the Prussian Army. The Hohenzollern kings and emperors had the Imperial Palace restored, including the mural paintings by Hermann Wislicenus.

After the Nazi seizure of power in 1933 Reichsminister Richard Walther Darré made Goslar the seat of the agricultural Reichsnährstand corporation. In 1936 the city obtained the title of Reichsbauernstadt. In the course of German rearmament a Luftwaffe airbase was built north of the town and several war supplier companies located in the vicinity, including subcamps of the Buchenwald and Neuengamme concentration camps. Nevertheless the historic town escaped strategic bombing during World War II.

Part of the British occupation zone from 1945, Goslar was the site of a displaced persons’ camp. During the Cold War era the city near the inner German border was a major garrison town for the West German army and the border police. After the fall of the Berlin Wall in 1989 the barracks were vacated and a major economic factor was lost. The Rammelberg mines were finally closed in 1988 after more than a thousand years.

In the summer of 2018 a bottled typewritten message dated 26 March 1930 was discovered in the roof of Goslar Cathedral, signed by four roofers, who bemoaned the economic state of the country. The bottle was discovered by a roofer who turned out to be the grandson of one of the signatories, who had been an 18-year-old apprentice in 1930. Goslar's mayor replaced the bottle with a copy of the 1930 message, adding his own confidential message.

=== Demographics ===
As of 31 December 2020 there were 50,184 inhabitants in Goslar (including Vienenburg).

Population statistics

| Year | Inhabitants |
|---|---|
| 1821 | 7,547 |
| 1848 | 9,748 |
| 1871 | 11,900 |
| 1885 | 15,997 |
| 1905 | 23,640 |
| 1925 | 27,881 |

| Year | Inhabitants |
|---|---|
| 1933 | 29,538 |
| 1939 | 34,371 |
| 1946 | 47,855 |
| 1950 | 53,804 |
| 1956 | 53,236 |

| Year | Inhabitants |
|---|---|
| 1961 | 54,151 |
| 1968 | 53,819 |
| 1970 | 52,649 |
| 1975 | 53,963 |
| 1980 | 52,556 |

| Year | Inhabitants |
|---|---|
| 1985 | 49,636 |
| 1990 | 46,251 |
| 1995 | 46,142 |
| 2000 | 44,278 |
| 2005 | 43,119 |
| 2010 | 40,989 |

(count: 31 December of each year)

== Politics ==
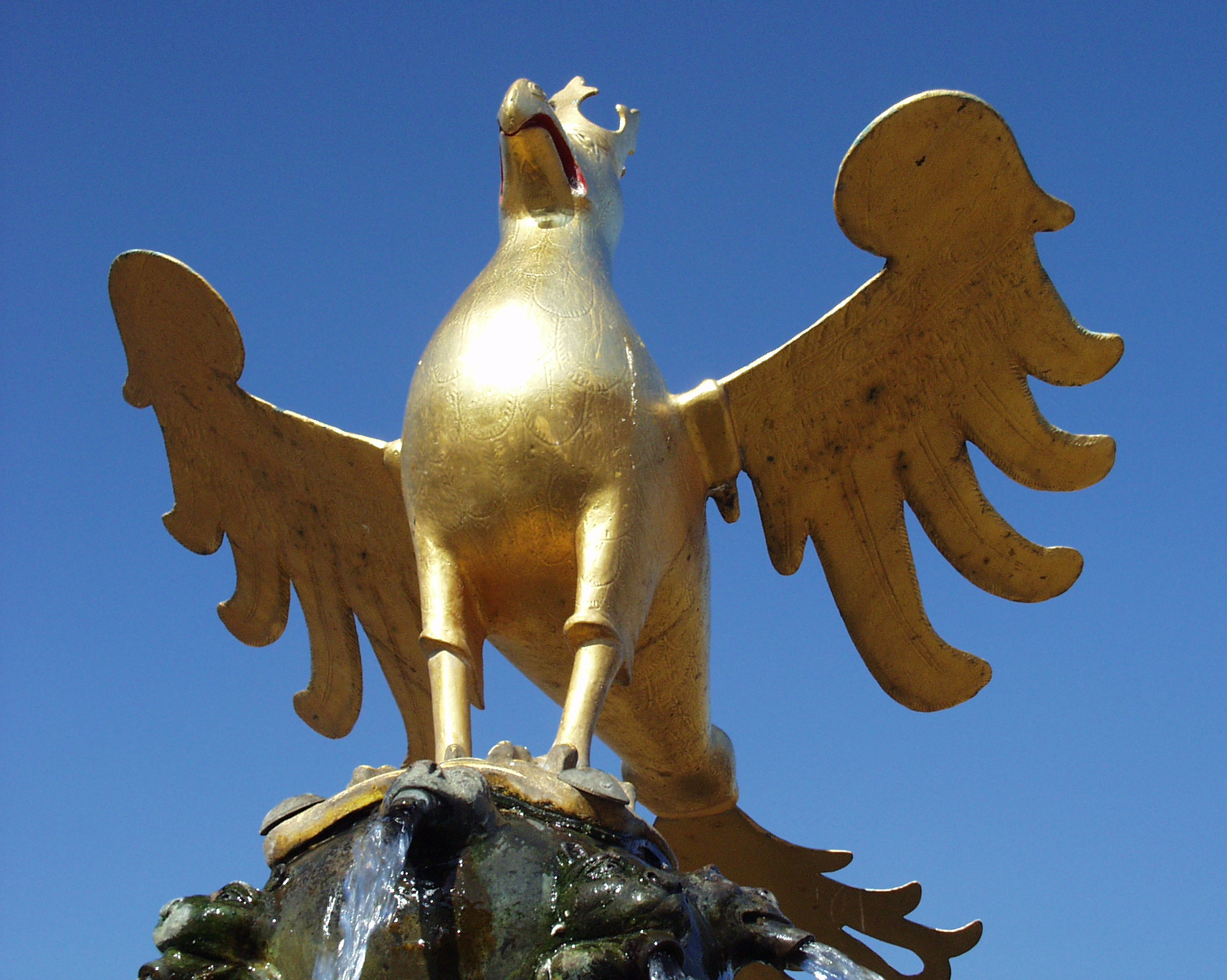
Goslar's Medieval Imperial Eagle

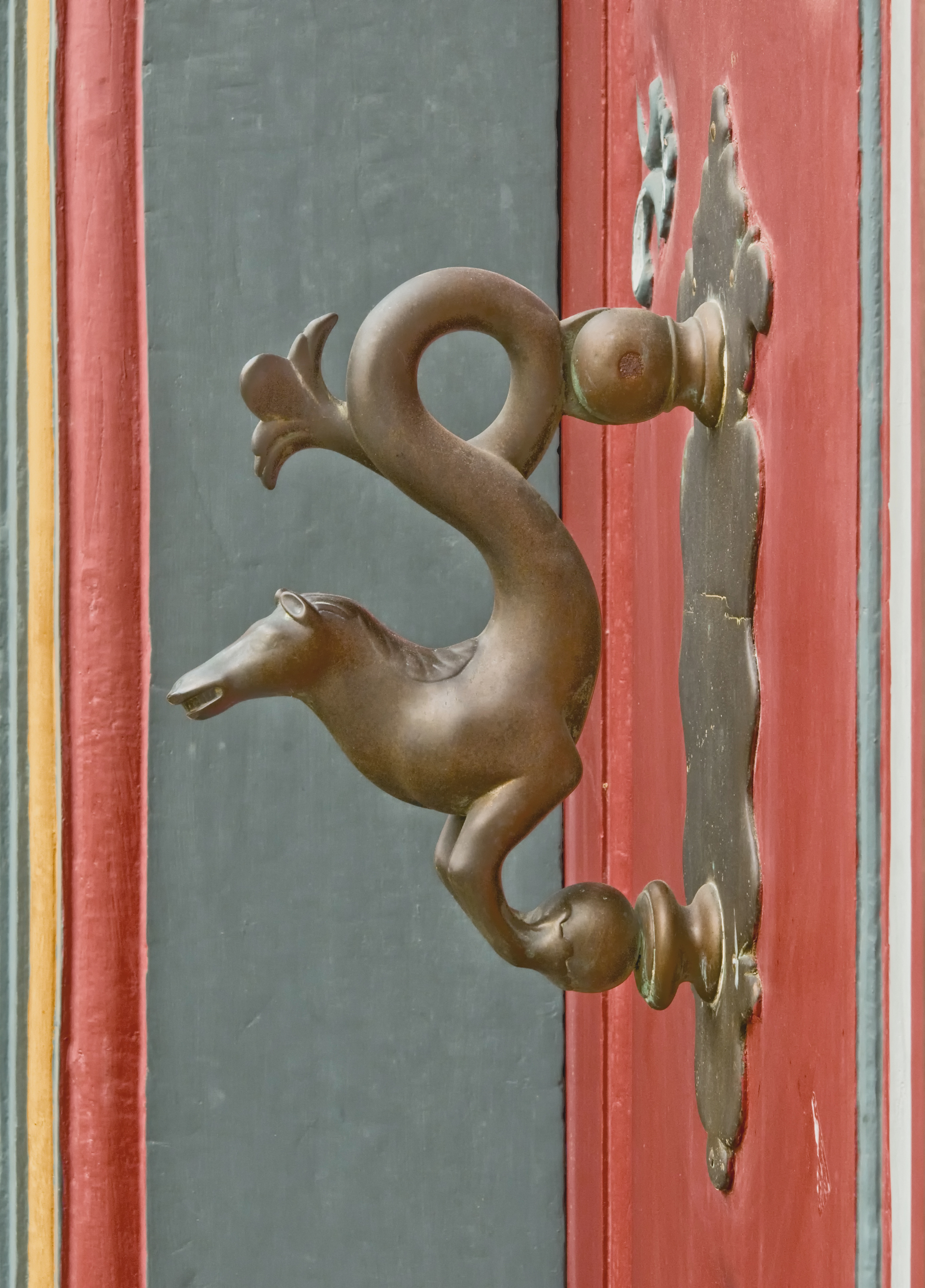
Door knocker with the name Brunswick Horse on the front door of a half-timbered house dating from the year 1719 in the centre of Goslar

=== Town council ===
For the legislature from 1 November 2016 until 31 October 2021 the seats were allocated as follows:

- SPD: 14 seats (37.55%)
- CDU: 10 seats (26.10%)
- AfD: 3 seats (9.28%)
- FDP: 3 seats (6.95%)
- Greens: 3 seats (6.70%)
- Goslarer Linke: 2 seats (5.36%)
- BGL: 2 seats (5.02%)
- AfG: 1 seat (1.69%)

=== Lord Mayor ===
Dr Oliver Junk was mayor from September 2011 to October 2021. Since November 2021 Urte Schwerdtner (SPD) has been Mayor of Goslar.

=== Members of Parliament ===
- European (Constituency: Southern Lower Saxony), Godelieve Quisthoudt-Rowohl (CDU), Erika Mann (SPD)
- Bundestag (Constituency 52: Goslar, Northeim, Osterode), First: Wilhelm Priesmeier (SPD), List: Hans Georg Faust (CDU)
- Landtag Lower Saxony (Constituency 16: Goslar), First: Petra Emmerich-Kopatsch (SPD), List: Dorothee Prüssner (CDU)

== Twin towns – sister cities ==
Goslar is twinned with:

- Arcachon, France (1965)
- Beroun, Czech Republic (1989)
- Brzeg, Poland (2000)
- Forres, Scotland, UK (1984)
- Ra'anana, Israel (2006)
- Windsor and Maidenhead, England, UK (1969)

== Culture and sights ==
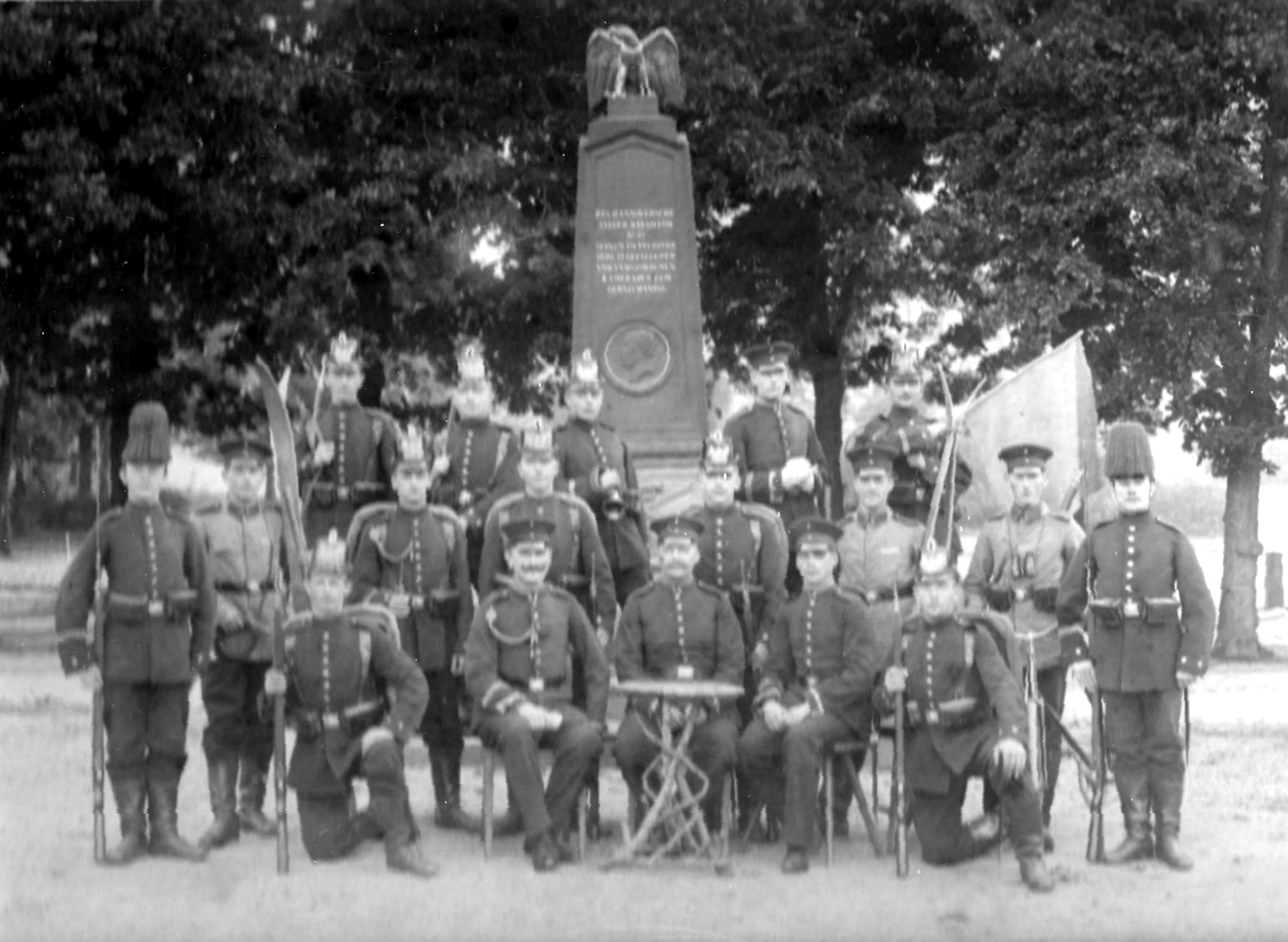
War memorial 1870/1871 at barrack yard

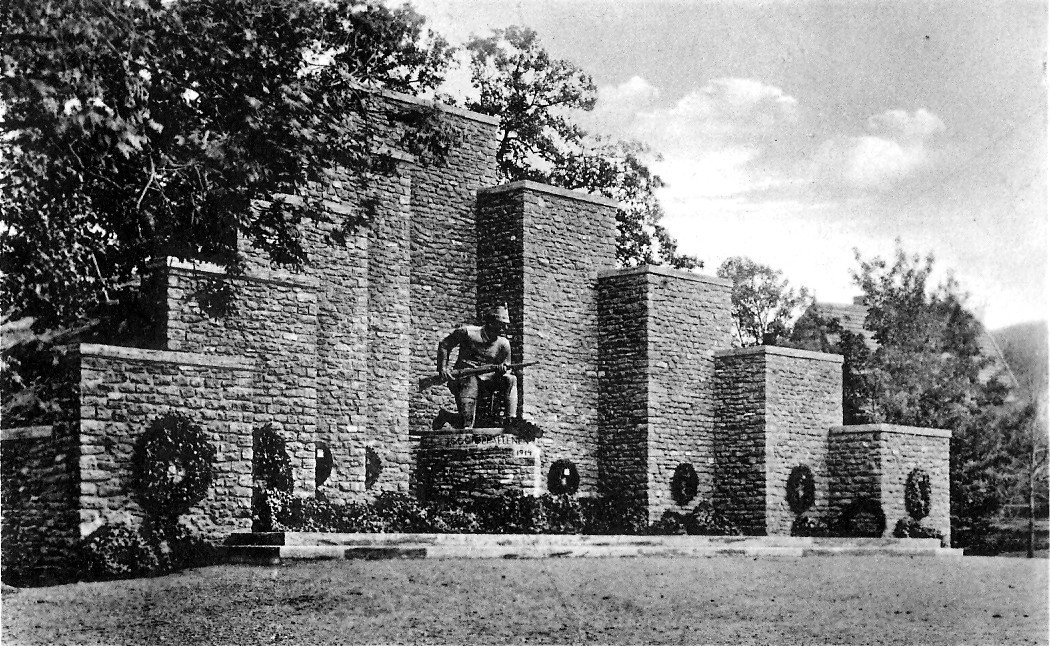
War memorial 1914–1918 at Thomaswall

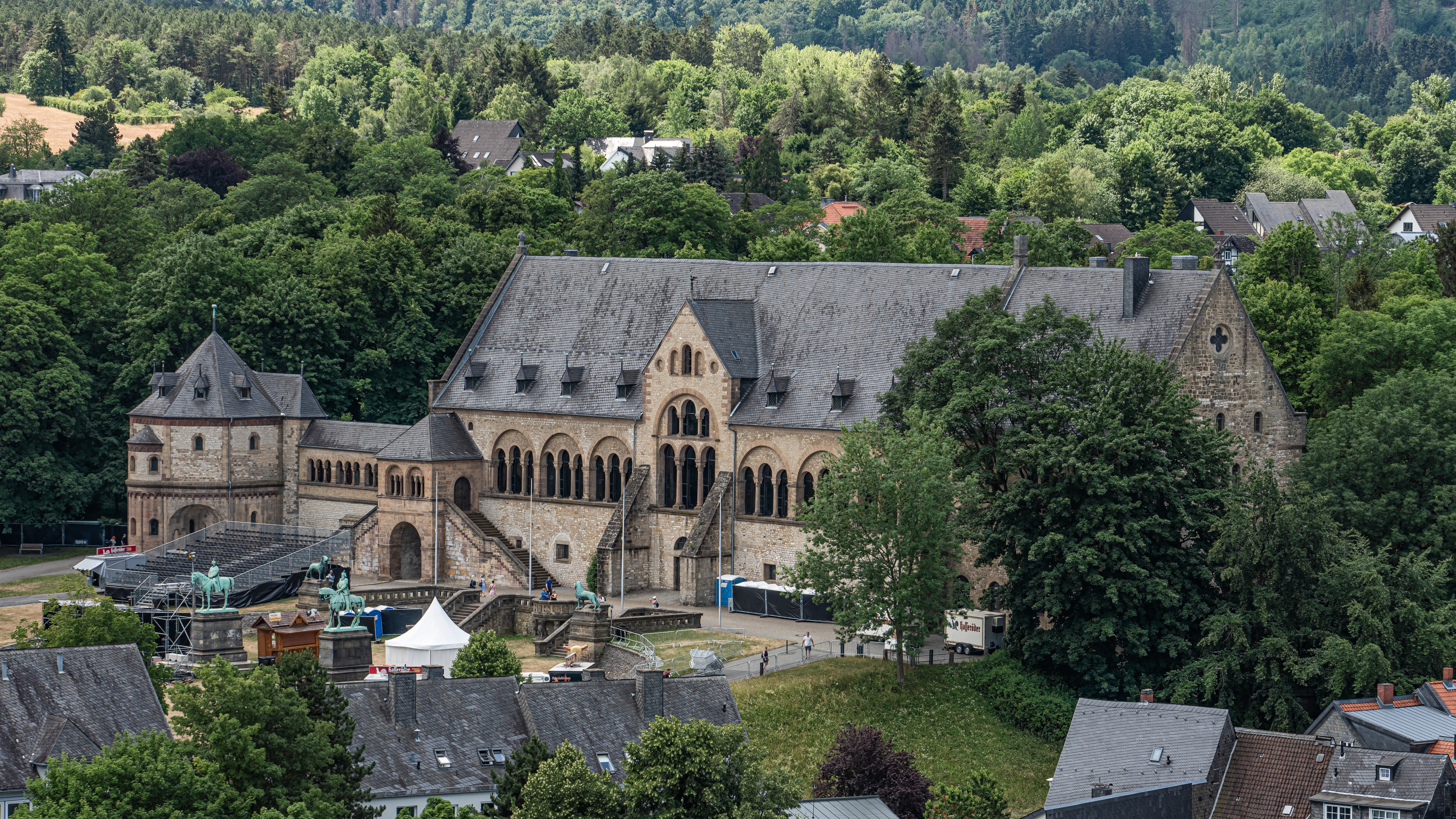
Medieval Imperial Palace (Kaiserpfalz)

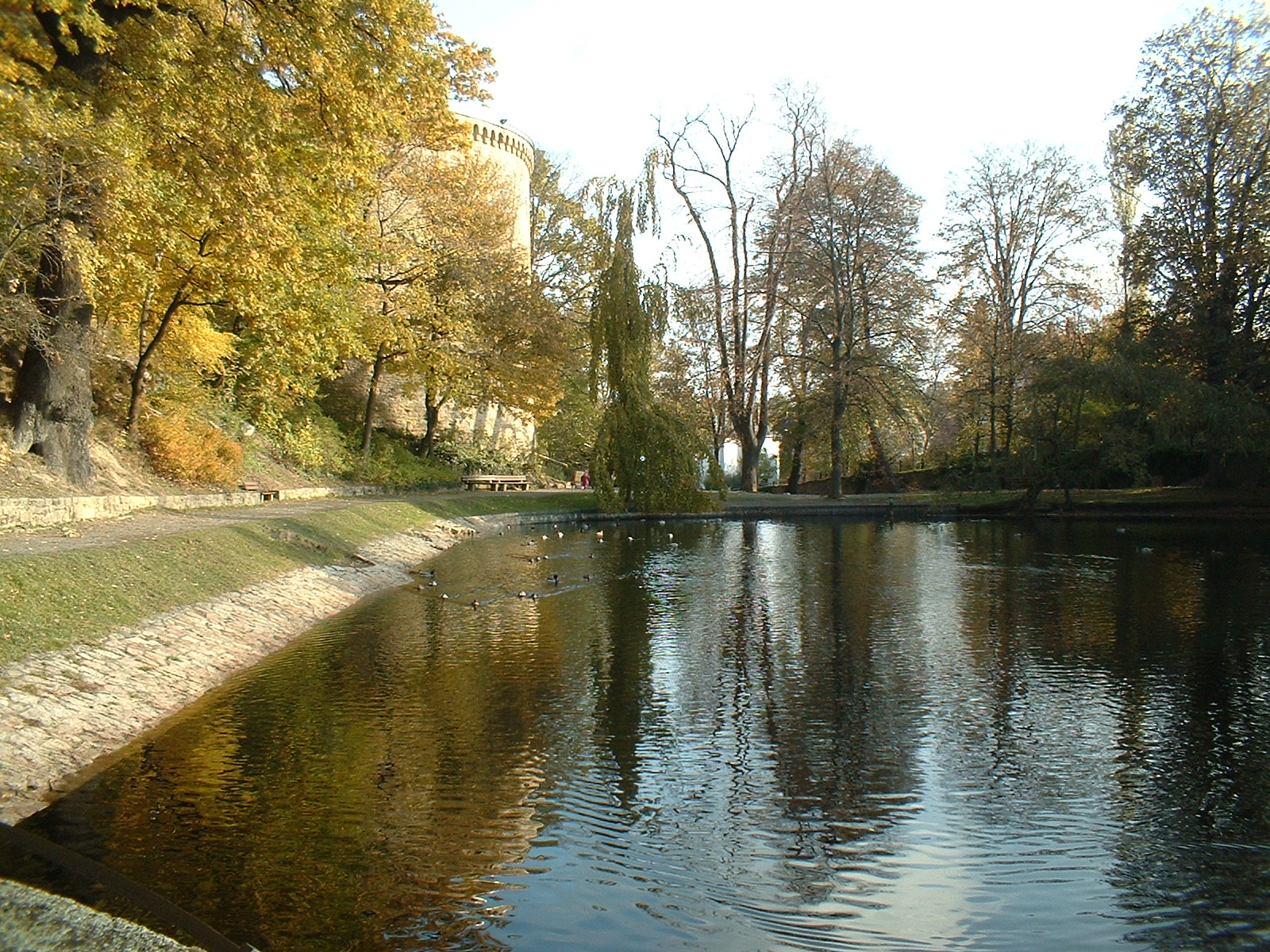
The Zwinger tower and pond

- Memorial to the fallen riflemen of the 10th Hanover Rifle Battalion in the Franco-Prussian War 1870/1871 (now near the Kahnteich)
- Memorial to the fallen riflemen of the 10th Hanover Rifle Battalion in World War I 1914–1918

=== Theatre ===
The Odeon Theatre is the town's major theatre. It has been recently refurbished. It is host to several productions of visiting theatre companies and music groups.

The alternative theatre Culture Power Station Harz or Kulturkraftwerk Harz is housed in a disused power station. It is run by volunteers and produces modern theatre, comedy and mostly alternative cultural events. Here the annual Goslar Fringe Culture Days are held during the first half of June.

=== Museums ===
- Museum and visitors’ mine Rammelsberg, an Anchor Point of ERIH, The European Route of Industrial Heritage
- Museum in the Kaiserpfalz, a 19th-C reconstruction of the medieval imperial palace
- Monks' House, Mönchehaus Museum of Contemporary and Modern Arts
- Goslar Museum
- Museum in the Gothic Town Hall
- Zwinger Tower and Dungeon, Museum of Late Mediaeval History

=== Religion ===
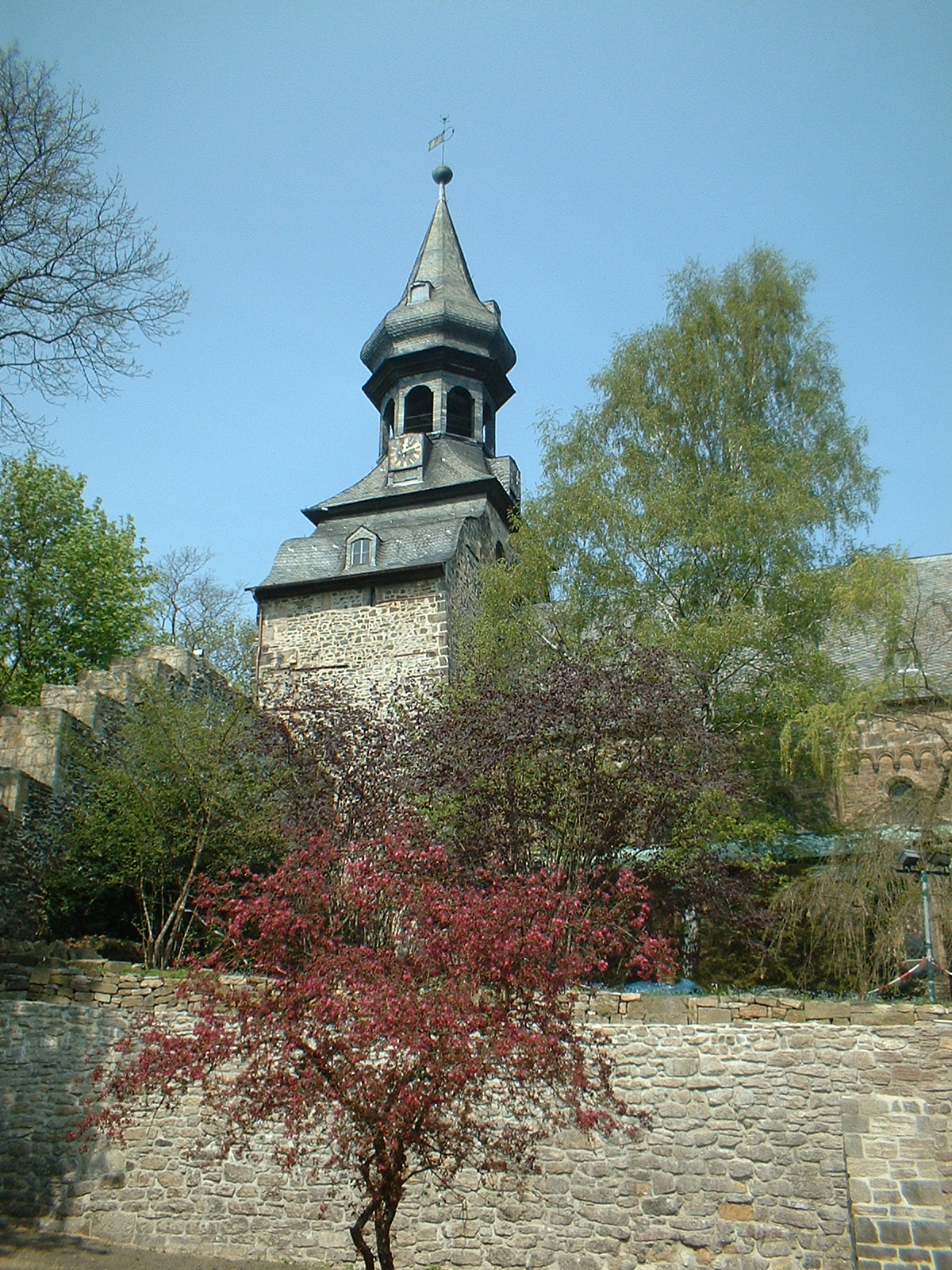
The Frankenberg Church

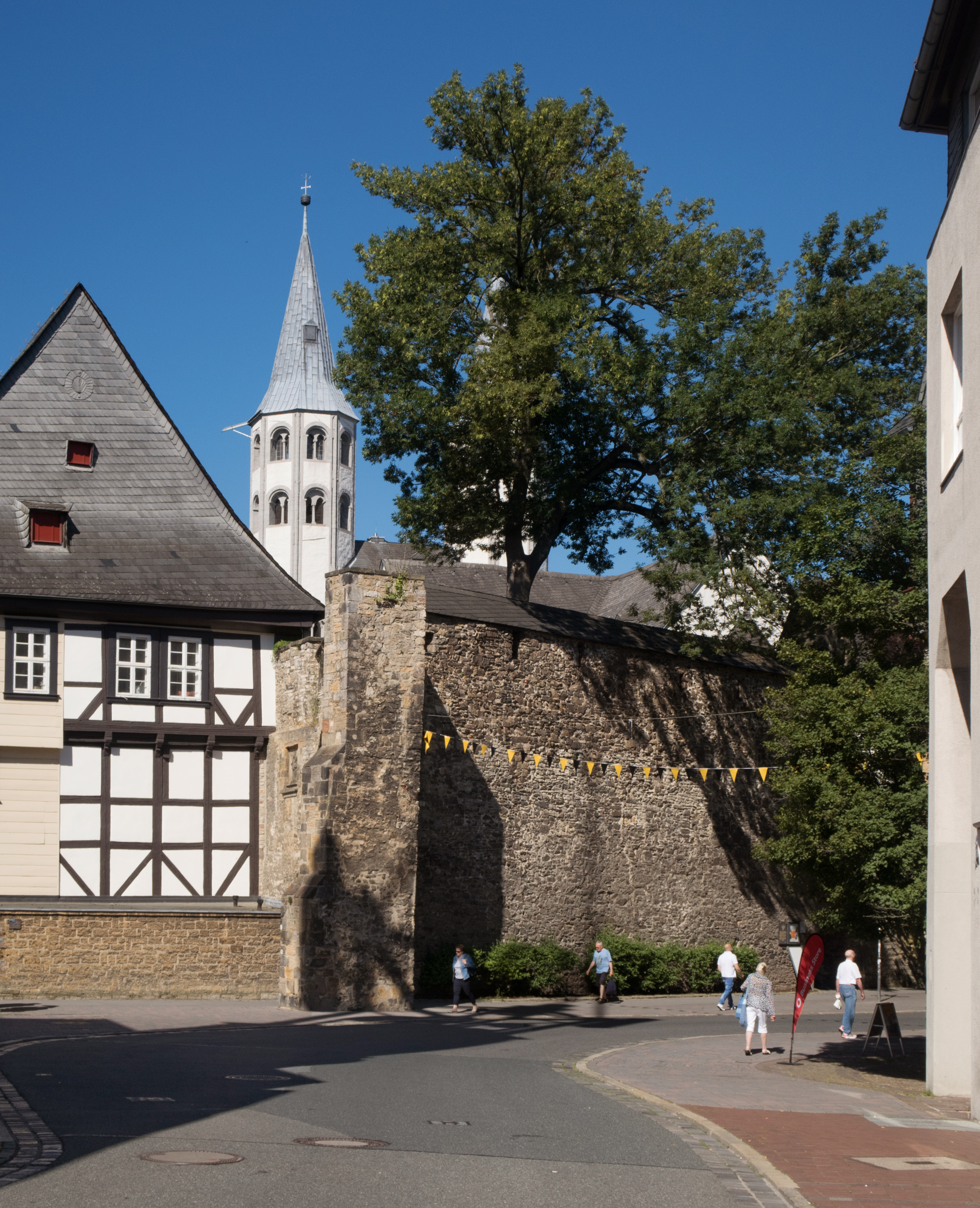
Church: Neuwerkkirche from the Mauerstrasse

- Protestant-Lutheran
  - Congregation Marktkirche, Market Church (build 1151, North Tower mountable)
  - Congregation Neuwerk, Newark Church
  - Congregation St Stephani, Saint Stephen
  - Congregation Zum Frankenberge, Frankenberg Church
  - Congregation Gustav-Adolf-Stabkirche, Gustav Adolf stave church in Hahnenklee
  - Congregation Martin-Luther-Kirche, Martin Luther Church
  - Congregation St Paulus Kirche, St Paul's Church, in Oker
  - Congregation St Georg, St George
  - Congregation St Johannes, St John
  - Parish Church St Kilian in Hahndorf
  - Congregation St Lukas, St Luke
  - Parish Church St Matthäus, St Matthew, in Jerstedt
  - Congregation St Peter
- Baptist
  - Congregation Christuskirche, Church of Christ
- Roman Catholic
  - Congregation St Jakobi, St James the Greater (built in 1073, Goslar's oldest romanesque church still in use)
  - Congregation Maria Schnee, St Mary of the Snows, in Hahnenklee
  - Congregation St Barbara (part of St James)
  - Congregation St Konrad, St Conrad (part of St James) in Oker
  - Congregations Ss Benno & George
  - Abbey St George
- Islamic Faith
  - Mosque of the Turkish-German Society
  - Goslar Mosque

=== Sports ===
Situated at the foot of the Harz mountains, Goslar offers a range of outdoor pursuits including swimming, rock climbing, motor sports, flying, sailing and mountain-biking.

The oldest and most traditional sports club is the MTV Goslar (founded in 1849). Its main facilities, a football pitch and gymnasium, are Lon the Golden Meadow (Goldene Aue) site.

The football department of Goslarer SC 08 earned the right to play in the fourth division Regionalliga Nord in 2009–10 after winning the Oberliga Niedersachsen championship.

=== Celebrations and Events ===
In 2006 Goslar hosted the Salier Year to celebrate the founding of this ancient German Imperial dynasty a millennium ago.

Other events include:

- Annual award (since 1975) of the ‘Imperial Ring’ to a personality who has made an outstanding contribution to society and the arts. Its recipients include Henry Moore, Joseph Beuys, Christo and Dani Karavan.
- Goslar International Concerto Days, mid to end August
- The Goslar Fair, early to mid July
- Annual Artisans market in the old town, usually beginning of August
- Old Town Festival, mid-September
- Hanseatic Days, Spring (usually during the Easter holidays)
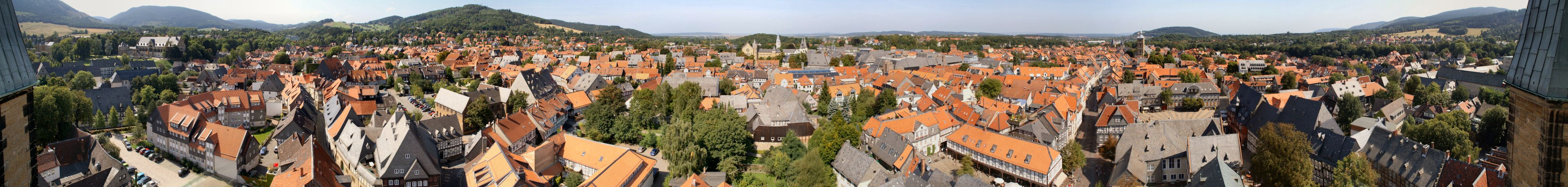
Panoramic view from the market church of Goslar

== Economy and infrastructure ==
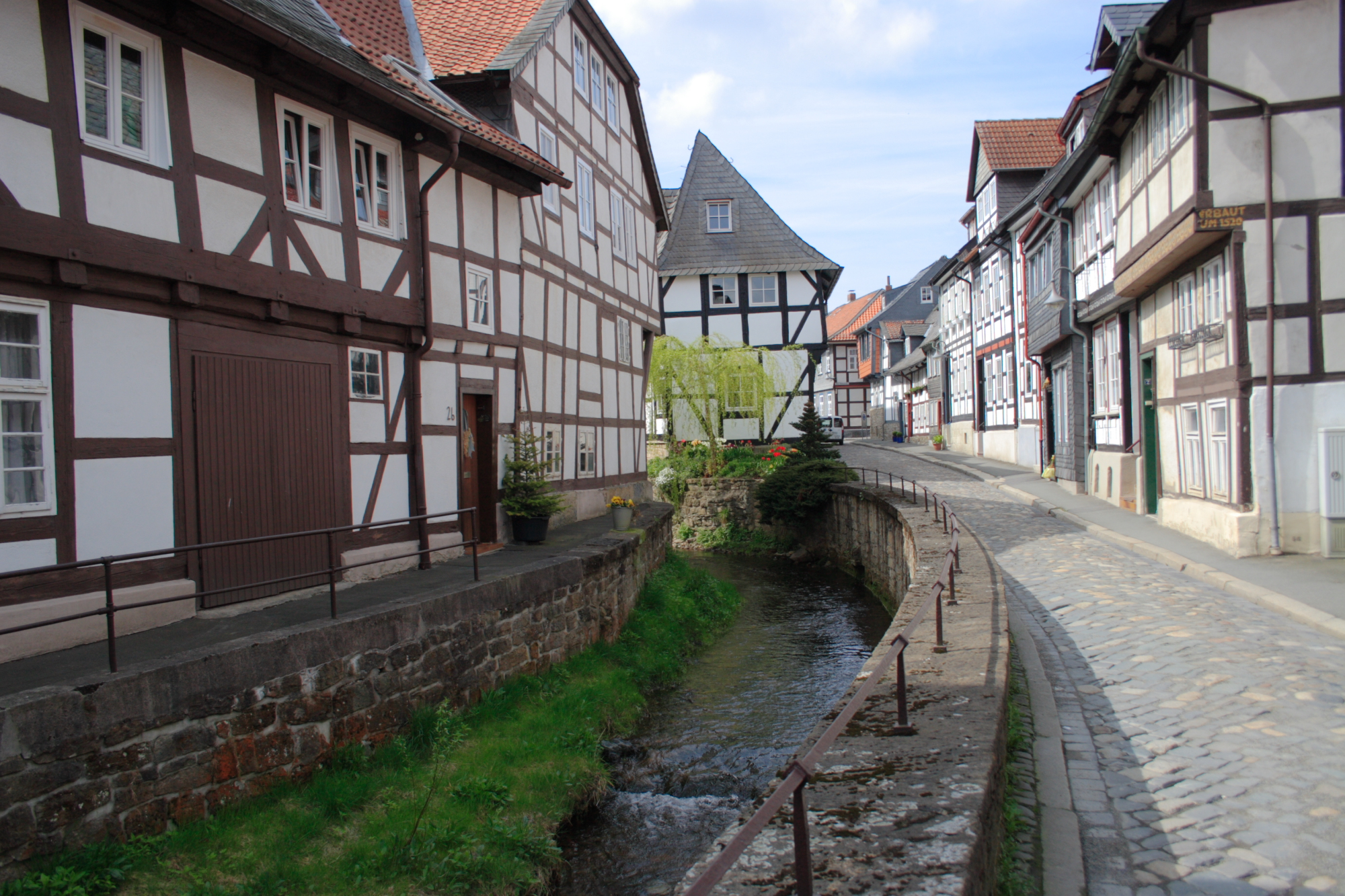
Half-timbered houses on the river Gose

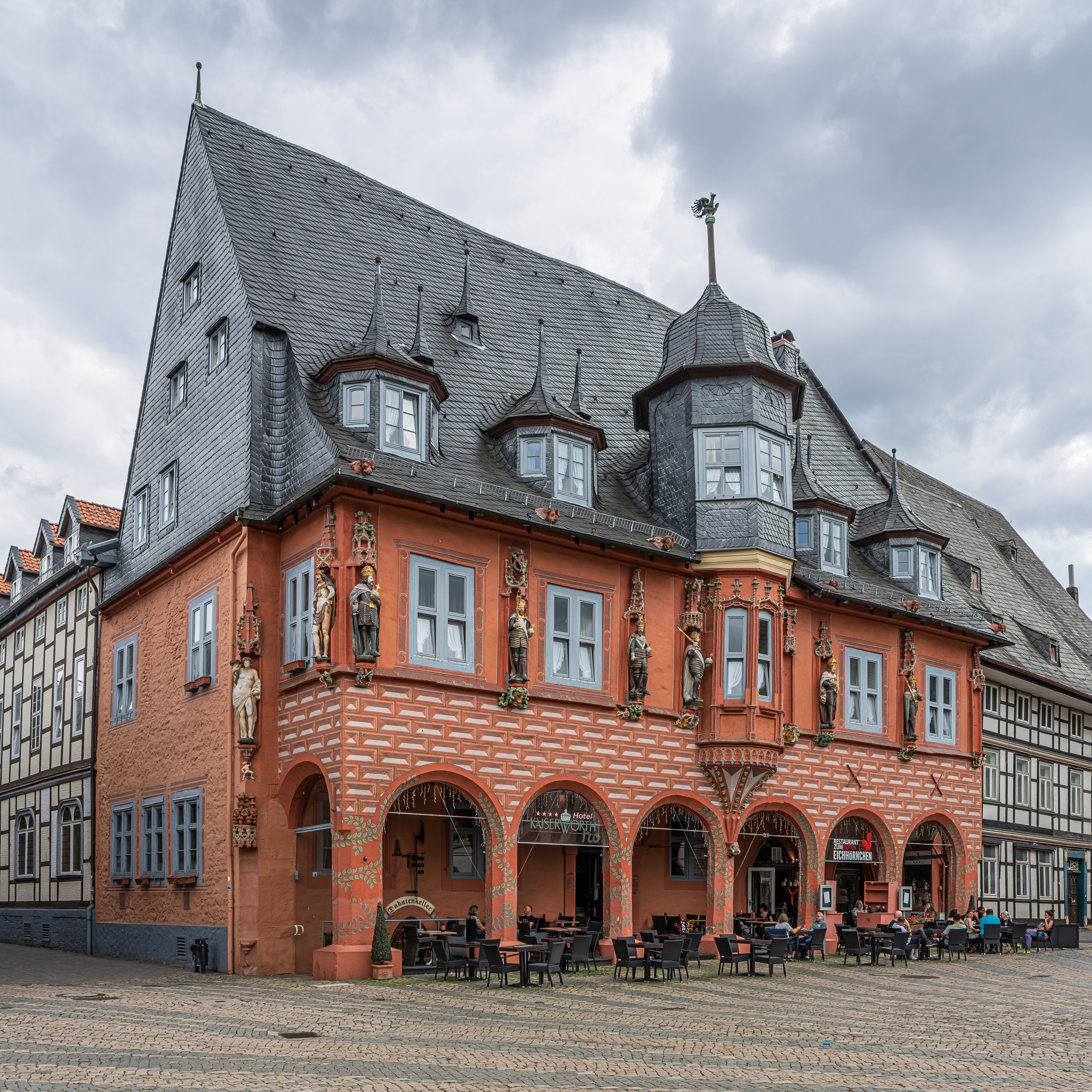
Hotel Kaiserworth

The town centre of Goslar serves as a regional shopping centre for the Northern Harz region. Here department stores, several supermarkets, elegant boutiques and restaurants can be found. Once weekly there is also a market, where farmers sell their local produce. There are also several car dealerships in the borough, some of which specialise in either discount/reimport or custom car sales.

Tourism is a booming sector in Goslar. Several hotels and bed and breakfasts are located in or near the centre of the town. In addition the town has become a popular resort for the elderly and there are many care homes in the town.

Goslar has become a popular conference venue. The Achtermann Hotel and the Kaiserpfalz are popular conference centres, host to the annual German Road & Transport Tribunal Days: the Deutscher Verkehrsgerichtstag

The largest employers in Goslar are H.C. Starck (chemistry company), tourism and the civil service. Many residents of Goslar commute to Salzgitter, where car production, steel works and white-collar jobs are based.

The Dr-Herbert-Nieper-Krankenhaus is a privately owned hospital in the Asklepios Harzkliniken group serving the greater Harz region. A new annex for intensitive medicine is under construction. There are several general practitioners, dentists and specialists distributed across the town. There is an emergency service.

=== Transport ===
Goslar has excellent road and rail links to the major European centre of population. Goslar is also a major transport hub for the Upper Harz mountains (highest peak at 1,141 m (3,744 ft) altitude).

With the A 7 and the A 395 there are two main Autobahns/motorways within 20 minutes of Goslar. The A 7 connects Hamburg/Hanover in the North to Frankfurt/Munich in the South. The A 395 branches off the main east-west Autobahn A 2 at Brunswick and ends at Vienenburg, some 12 km (7 mi) east of Goslar. The A 2 connects Berlin – to the East – to the Ruhr Area and the Netherlands in the West. The Federal highways B 6 and B 82 converge at Goslar and are routed via the four-lane by-pass past the town centre. The B 6 is mostly four laned and approaches Goslar via the scenic Hildesheim–Salzgitter route.

Goslar is served by the German Railway network (Deutsche Bahn) lines Hanover–Goslar–Halle (Saxony-Anhalt) as well as Brunswick–Goslar–Kreiensen. The central railway station is near the town centre. There is a park-and-ride system for commuters to Brunswick and Hanover.

At the railway station there is a central bus station with regular bus services to various destinations in the Harz mountains. The buses belong to DB Stadtverkehr.

=== Media ===
The regional newspaper is the Goslarsche Zeitung, which has an estimated daily readership of 90,000. The General-Anzeiger is owned by the Heinrich Bauer publishing group with an editorial office in Goslar. There are also two free newspapers..

Radio Okerwelle GoslarRadio is the regional private radio station based in Brunswick, which broadcasts modern music, information and news in German to the Brunswick region.

=== Education ===
The three-tier education system in Goslar district falls under Lower-Saxon legislation. The language of instruction at all schools is German. The nine primary schools are distributed across the entire municipality and the associated hamlets. There are two grammar schools (years 5-12/13), the Christian-von-Dohm-Gymnasium and the more traditional Ratsgymnasium, both of which prepare their pupils for an academic career. Three intermediate-level schools (years 5–10), the Andre-Mouton Realschule, the Realschule Hoher Weg and the Realschule Goldene Aue, prepare their pupils for a professional career. There are also two vocational schools (years 5-9/10): the Hauptschule Oker and the Hauptschule Kaiserpfalz. The Sonderschule caters for children with learning difficulties and special needs.

The supplementary public Waldorf school Harz – Branch Goslar educates its pupils along a more spiritual line termed anthroposophy, based on the teachings of the Austrian pedagogue Rudolf Steiner.

For years 10–12 there are four job-training colleges located at Goslar in crafts, economics and care for the elderly for students from Goslar district and beyond. There are two state vocational schools offering part-time education within the German dual vocational education and training system and full-time education. BBS 1 Goslar -Am Stadtgarten- focuses on education in business administration, economics, health services and information and communications technology (ICT). BBS Goslar-Baßgeige/Seesen concentrates on mechanical, electrical and textile engineering; natural sciences: chemistry, physics, biology; food services, domestic science and industry and administration.

The nearest university to Goslar is the Engineering and Mining School at Clausthal-Zellerfeld in the Upper Harz mountains, 21 kilometres (13 miles) south of Goslar within Goslar district. Some 80 km (50 mi) to the south is the University of Göttingen (founded by King George II of Great Britain).

Adult education (lifelong learning) for the Goslar area is offered at the Volkshochschule.

== Notable people ==
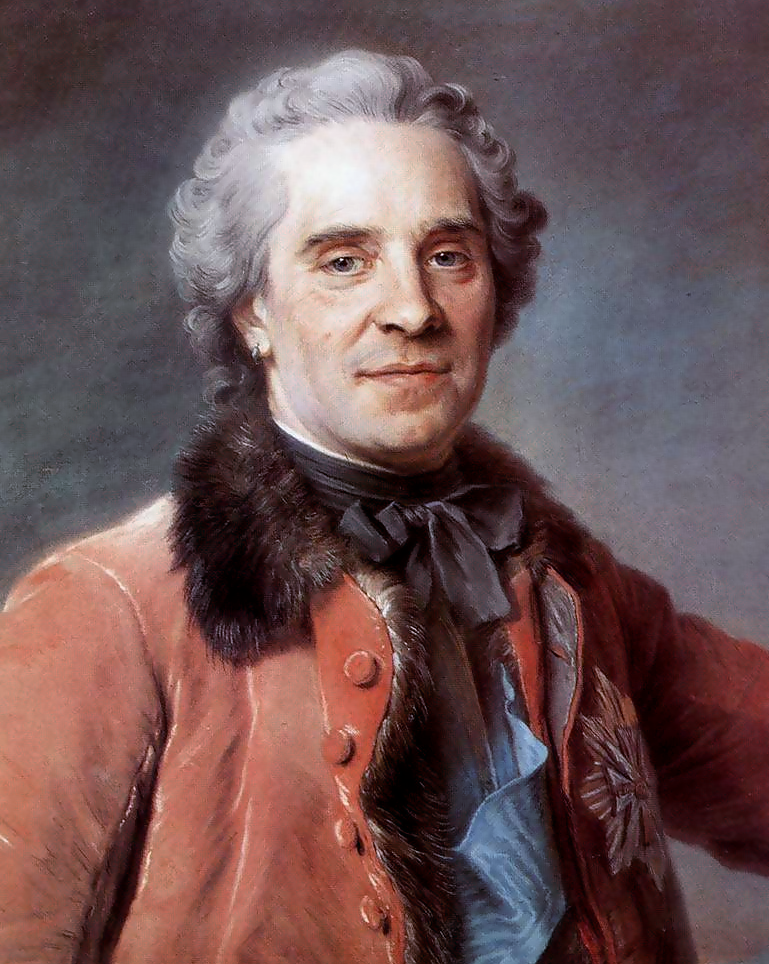
Maurice de Saxe, c. 1750

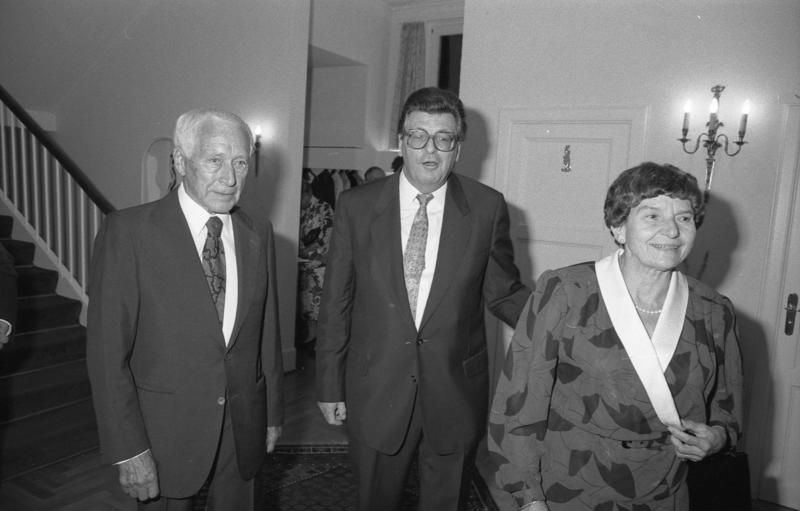
Ernst Jünger, Philipp Jenninger & Liselotte Jünger, 1986

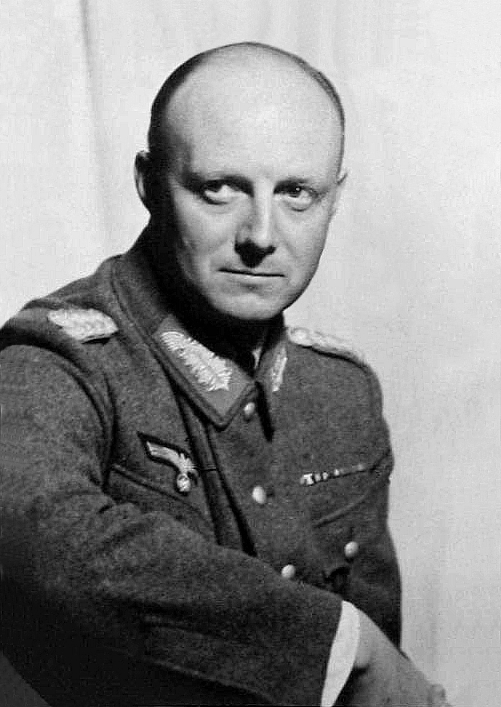
Henning von Tresckow, 1944

- Frederuna (887–917), queen consort of France by marriage to King Charles III of France.
- Kraft of Meissen (died 1066) provost of Goslarer Dom (Collegiate Church of Goslar), and Bishop of Meissen in 1066.
- Henry IV, Holy Roman Emperor (1050–1106), King of Germany and Holy Roman Emperor.
- Helmold (ca 1120 – after 1177), a Saxon historian of the 12th century and priest.
- Goslar is the ancestral home of the Siemens family since 1384; including the Prussian-British-Russian industrial pioneers Werner von Siemens, Sir William Siemens and Carl von Siemens
- Christoph Andreas Schlüter (1668–1743), metallurgist, assayer and mining official.
- Maurice de Saxe (1696–1750), Marshal General of France. Adversary of the Hanoverians.
- Wilhelm Ripe (1818–1885), painter and graphic designer during the era of Romanticism, died locally
- Albert Niemann (1834–1861), chemist and pharmacist. Credited with the discovery of cocaine
- Otto Wilhelm August Nieper (1848–1939), Chief Surgeon at the hospital in Goslar, which was renamed the Dr.-Herbert-Nieper-Krankenhaus in his honor.
- Ludwig Gattermann (1860–1920), a chemist who worked on organic chemistry and inorganic chemistry
- Adolf Grimme (1889–1963), Social Democratic politician and member of the German resistance to Nazism
- Ernst Jünger (1895–1998), German soldier (recipient of the Pour le Mérite decoration in WWI) and author, lived in Goslar from December 1933 to 1936.
- Hans Colbitz (1899–1972), artist, painter, teacher at Albrecht-Duerer-Oberrealschule in Berlin-Neukölln
- Henning von Tresckow (1901–1944), German military officer and leading anti-Hitler conspirator, was a student at the Goslar Realgymnasium from 1913 until 1917.
- Heinz Günther Guderian (1914–2004), officer in the Wehrmacht and later a Major general
- Rudolf Sprung (1925–2015), politician (CDU), Member of Bundestag 1969–1994
- Dieter Zechlin (1926–2012), pianist
- Rudolf Bindig (born 1940), politician (SPD), Member of Bundestag 1976–2005
- Hermann Max (born 1941), church musician and conductor
- Phylicia Whitney (born 1950), journalist and public speaker
- Ewald Schnug (born 1954), agricultural researcher, professor, Honorary-President of the International Scientific Center for Fertilizers
- Falko Feldmann (born 1959), German biologist and phytomedicologist (Herbal medicine practitioner)
- Sigmar Gabriel (born 1959), politician (SPD), Federal Minister for Foreign Affairs
- Regine Schumann (born 1961), artist, painter and light artist
- Belit Onay (born 1981), politician, Mayor of Hanover since 2019
- Friedrich Foertsch (1900-1976), 2nd inspector general of the Bundeswehr.

=== Sport ===
- Ernst Pistulla (1906–1944), light heavyweight boxer, silver medallist at the 1928 Summer Olympics
- Günther Brennecke (1927–2014), field hockey player, team bronze medallist at the 1952 Summer Olympics
- Angelika Dünhaupt (born 1946), luger, (rides a sled face-up and feet-first); bronze medallist at the 1968 Winter Olympics
- Carola Hoffmann (born 1962), field hockey player, team silver medallist at the 1988 Summer Olympics
- Mathias Hain (born 1972), football goalkeeper, played 513 games
- Aaron Hunt (born 1986), footballer, played 413 games
