= Battery tower =

Defensive tower

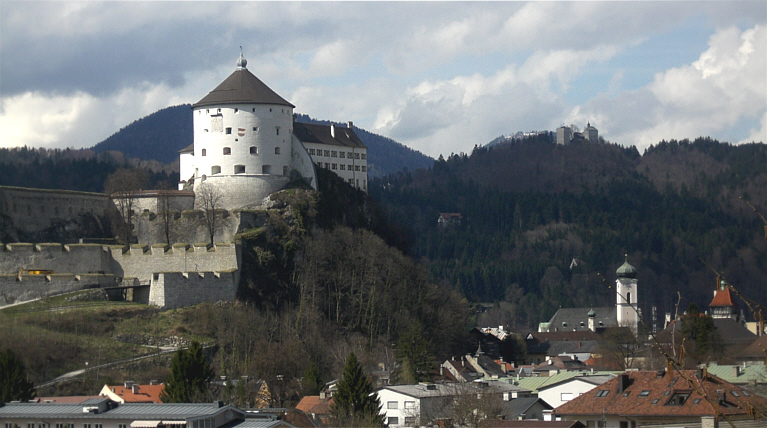
Battery Tower of Kufstein Fortress

A battery tower was a defensive tower built into the outermost defences of many castles and town walls, from the 15th century, after the advent of firearms. Its name is derived from the word battery, a group of several cannon.

These, usually round, towers could house numerous cannon oriented in various directions and on several levels and their firepower was therefore clearly superior to that of any attackers who, at best, could only bring their cannon to bear on the main line of assault.

The individual levels of battery towers are often connected by ramps so that the cannon could be arranged in various ways at the many embrasures.

Where artillery towers were level with their adjacent walls they were called roundels.

There are battery towers at:

- Bentheim Castle
- Nanstein Castle
- Neudahn Castle
- Burg Castle
- Calenberg Castle
- Zwinger

== See also ==
- Bastion
- Roundel
