= Phylicia Whitney =

German journalist and public speaker

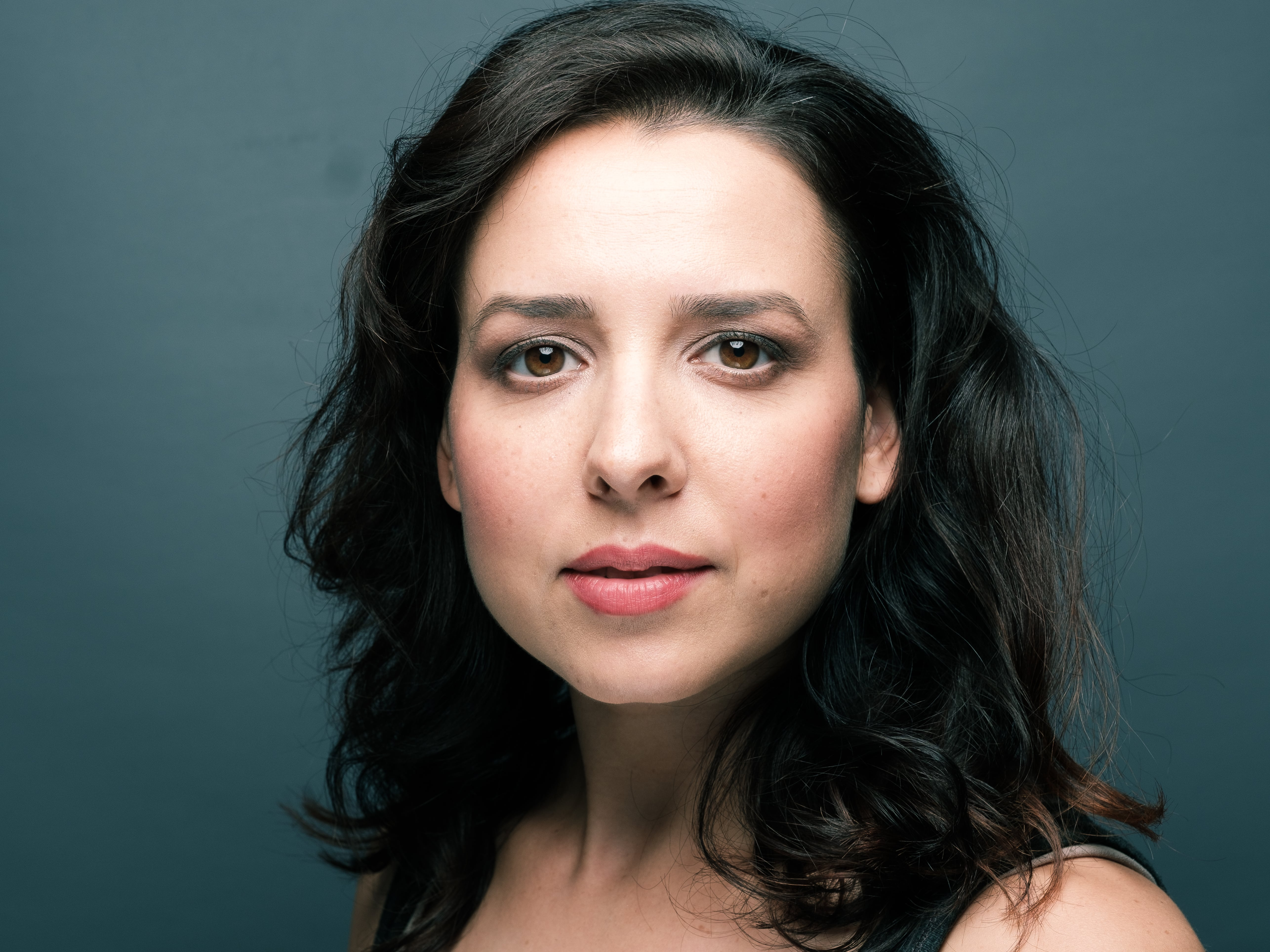
- Whitney in 2019
- Born: Goslar, West Germany
- Education: Cologne University of Applied Sciences
- Occupations: Presenter, author, producer and journalist

Phylicia "Flitzi" Whitney is a German presenter, author, producer and journalist. She has been moderating the magazine 'Inside eSports' since January 2020 and has been a reporter of Sat. 1 Breakfast Television and Südwestrundfunk since 2019. She gained notoriety as a reporter through various magazines such as RTL Zwei and Punkt 12. She has been a host for the Ludicious Game Awards, Saturn Logitech and 20th century Fox.

== Personal life ==
Whitney was born on February 9 in Goslar, West Germany and grew up in Hanover. She enjoyed music, joining choir and attending piano lessons. Whitney gave lessons in hip-hop to her children and other young people until 2016. After her acting training, she moved to Cologne where she still lives today. She is involved with various organizations dedicated to animal welfare and climate protection. In a May 2025 episode of Sat. 1 Breakfast Television, Whitney came out as a lesbian.

== Career ==
After graduating from high school, Whitney completed an apprenticeship at the Hanover Theatre for the Performing Arts and took part in multiple theatre productions. She joined RTL for a second apprenticeship, then began to work for various programs as an editor and reporter. In 2012, she produced a web series. Soon after, she graduated with a degree of editing at the Cologne University of Applied Sciences.

Whitney joined Sat. 1 Breakfast Television in 2013. She discusses topics such as video games, apps, hardware and presents recent technology highlights. She reported for RTL Zwei until 2018 and reported on various action events for Games.ch, Red Bull and Sony. In 2016, she began working as a freelance TV reporter for Punkt 12, Nitro and Vox and until 2019, Whitney hosted multiple livestreams, interviews and backstage reports for Alles was zählt, Gute Zeiten, schlechte Zeiten and Among Us. She was reporter for the Toggo TV Show every Saturday and Sunday on Super RTL until 2020.

Whitney also works as a video journalist and producer, and was a reporter for multiple trade fairs relating to Anime. As a gaming journalist, Whitney has written for the multiple magazines, some of which include Chip gameware, Gameswelt and Gamepires. In 2017, GamesWirtschaft ranked her in the top 10 best women in the German games industry in the “Media” category and was nominated for the German Sports Journalist Award in 2021.
