= Zwinger (Goslar) =

Coordinates: 51°54′10.31″N 10°25′58.10″E

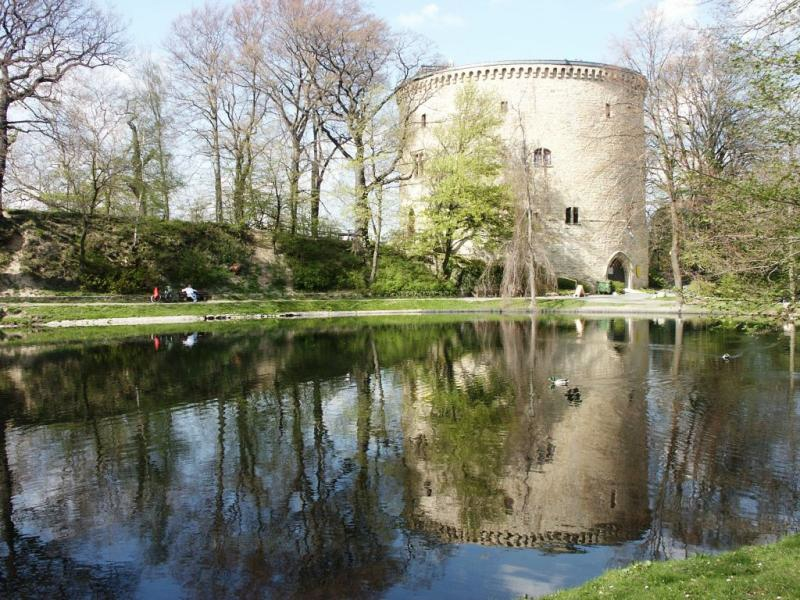
The Zwinger in Goslar

The Zwinger in Goslar is a battery tower that is part of the fortifications of the old imperial city of Goslar, Germany. It is located on the Thomaswall in the south of the town and was built in 1517. On this side Goslar was strongly dominated by the nearby hill of Rammelsberg, which would have made a good location for positioning enemy guns in the event of an attack on the town; the town fortifications therefore needed the extra protection of a strong battery tower at this point.

The stonework of Goslar's Zwinger was predominantly made of sandstone quarried from the Sudmerberg northeast of Goslar and mortared with burnt lime. Because lime burning was still in not fully developed, the builders mixed the mortar with horsehair, quark, goat's milk and ox blood to harden it fully.

Immediately under the corbelling are two sandstone tablets in the wall bearing the coats of arms of the German Empire and the town of Goslar and the inscription "Anno dm M D X V II". The original conical roof was dismantled in 1857.

With a wall thickness at the base of 6.5 metres, a diameter of 26 metres and a height of 20 metres, the Zwinger is one of the strongest surviving and utilised defensive towers in Europe.

The Goslar Zwinger has been privately owned since 1 August 1936. Today it houses a restaurant on the ground floor, three holiday apartments on the middle floor and a small museum of medieval weapons, armour and torture implements on the top floor.
