= Roundel (fortification) =

Form of medieval defensive structure

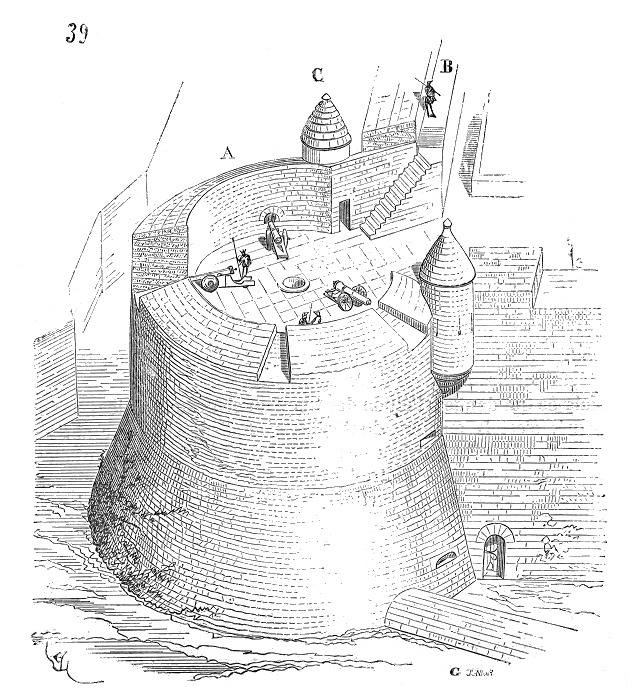
Roundel in Fort de Salses (southern France), 15th century, drawing by Viollet-le-Duc

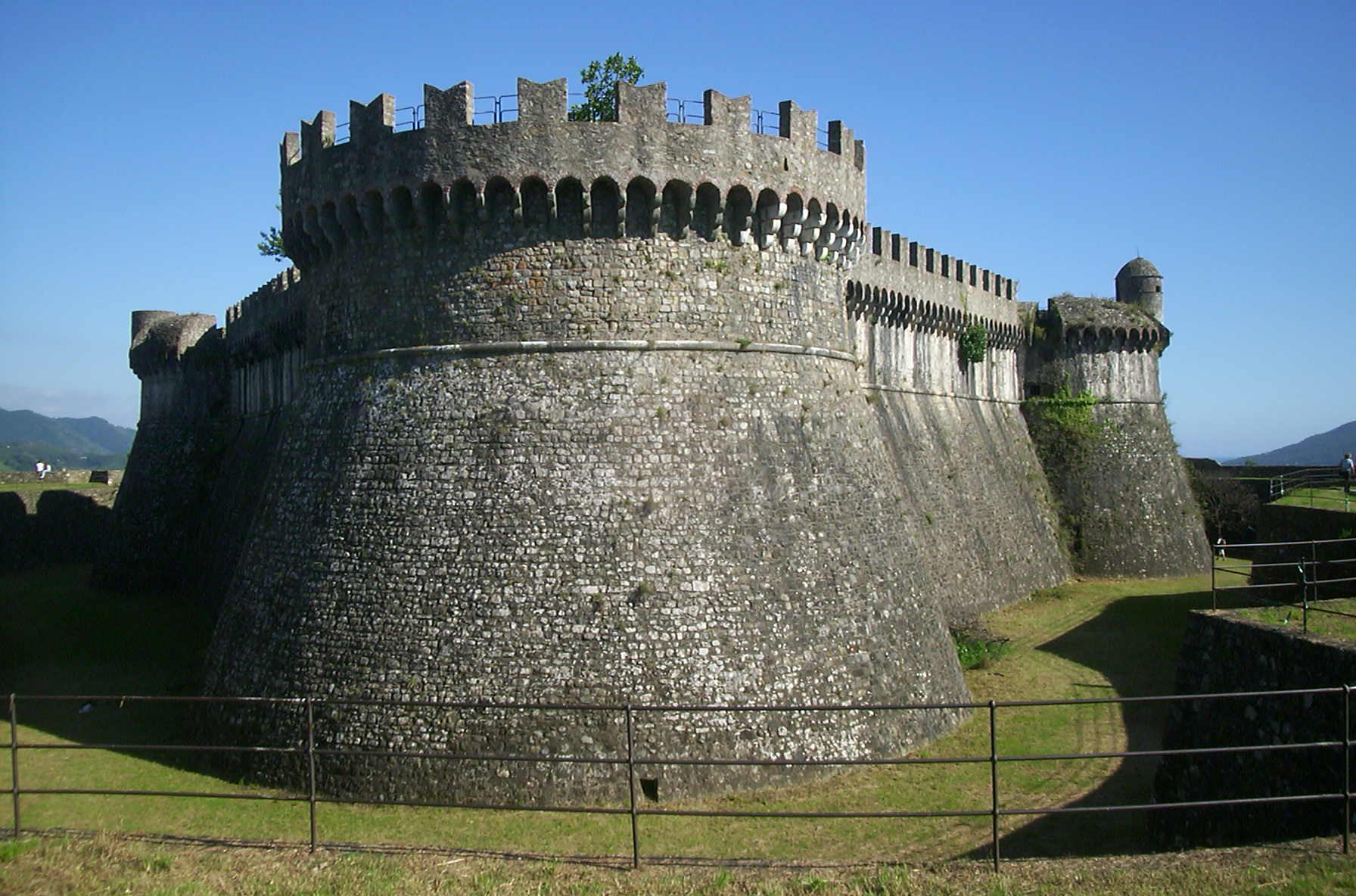
Roundel of Fortezza Firmafede in Sarzana (north Italy), 15th century

The roundel is an artillery fortification with a rounded or circular plan of a similar height to the adjacent defensive walls. If the fortification is clearly higher than the walls it is called a battery tower.

== Design ==
The design of a roundel, which was massive in comparison with a normal defensive tower, enabled the deployment of heavy cannon. Roundels were built of both earth and brickwork; in the latter case, vaulted rooms (casemates) were built on the inside.

== History ==
=== Emergence ===
Roundels appeared in the 15th century when cannon gradually developed into an effective siege weapon. Roundels are the oldest permanent artillery fortifications. Their heyday was in the 15th and early 16th centuries. Early examples of artillery roundels are in the town fortifications of Tábor before 1433 and Sion Castle, that around 1426/27, and certainly before the siege of 1437 were modified. Other early central European examples that have survived include roundels at Sigmundskron Castle near Bozen (from 1473), at the Hessian water castle of Friedewald (from 1476), the neighbouring Herzberg (from 1477), Haut-Kœnigsbourg from 1479, Breuberg (around 1480), in Halle a. d. Saale (from 1484), in Burghausen a. d. Salzach (around 1488), Heidelberg Palace (around 1490/1500), or the southwest roundel of Marburg Castle (1522–23) and in the shape of the Fulda Roundel in front of Kassel Palace (1523).

=== Demise ===
Like the horseshoe-shaped bastion, the roundel has a so-called blind spot which makes it vulnerable. In addition, the upper level of a roundel had little space for heavy cannon. Even the casemates of a roundel could only house a few cannon because they created a lot of gunsmoke which only dispersed slowly. The roundel was a stage in the development of late medieval fortifications and did not meet the demands of defensive works of the early modern period. Even the construction of large and thick-walled roundels like those at Munot in Schaffhausen built from 1563 to 1585, were an insufficient response to the technology of the time.

As a result of its disadvantages the roundel was replaced in many places during the 16th century by the acute-angled bastion with a pentangular ground plan based on Italian practice. In spite of the advantages of the angled bastion, various European fortresses continued to be protected by roundels until well into the 17th century, something that was partly due to the high cost of fortress construction. In addition, expertise on bastion design only spread very slowly across many parts of Europe.

=== Later design and re-emergence ===
For decades after the invention of the angled bastion, roundels were built, albeit now more often in combination with earthworks or rock and earth combinations (artillery ramparts) as part of a continuous main defensive line that gave greater protection from artillery fire.

Examples of the more recent type are the two roundels (and connecting artillery ramparts on the west side of Heidelberg Castle (from c. 1526), the expansion of Celle's town fortifications (around 1530) (not preserved), the six roundels of the small town of Pfalzel an der Mosel (from 1532), the four artillery towers of Solothurn (from 1534), the three mre recent roundels of the Sparrenburg above Bielefeld (from 1535) and the roundel at the Württemberg state fortress of Hohentwiel (from 1538). Even the imperial city of Nuremberg built between 1527 and 1550 several smaller roundels and between 1556 and 1559 the four prominent round towers at the main gates as artillery platforms, as did the imperial town of Rothenburg ob der Tauber in 1572. Many fortresses consist entirely of interlinked roundels, for example Deal Castle on the south coast of England, the construction of which had been started in 1539. In the late 18th and 19th centuries, roundels came back into vogue due to changes in military technology.

==== Plassenburg example ====
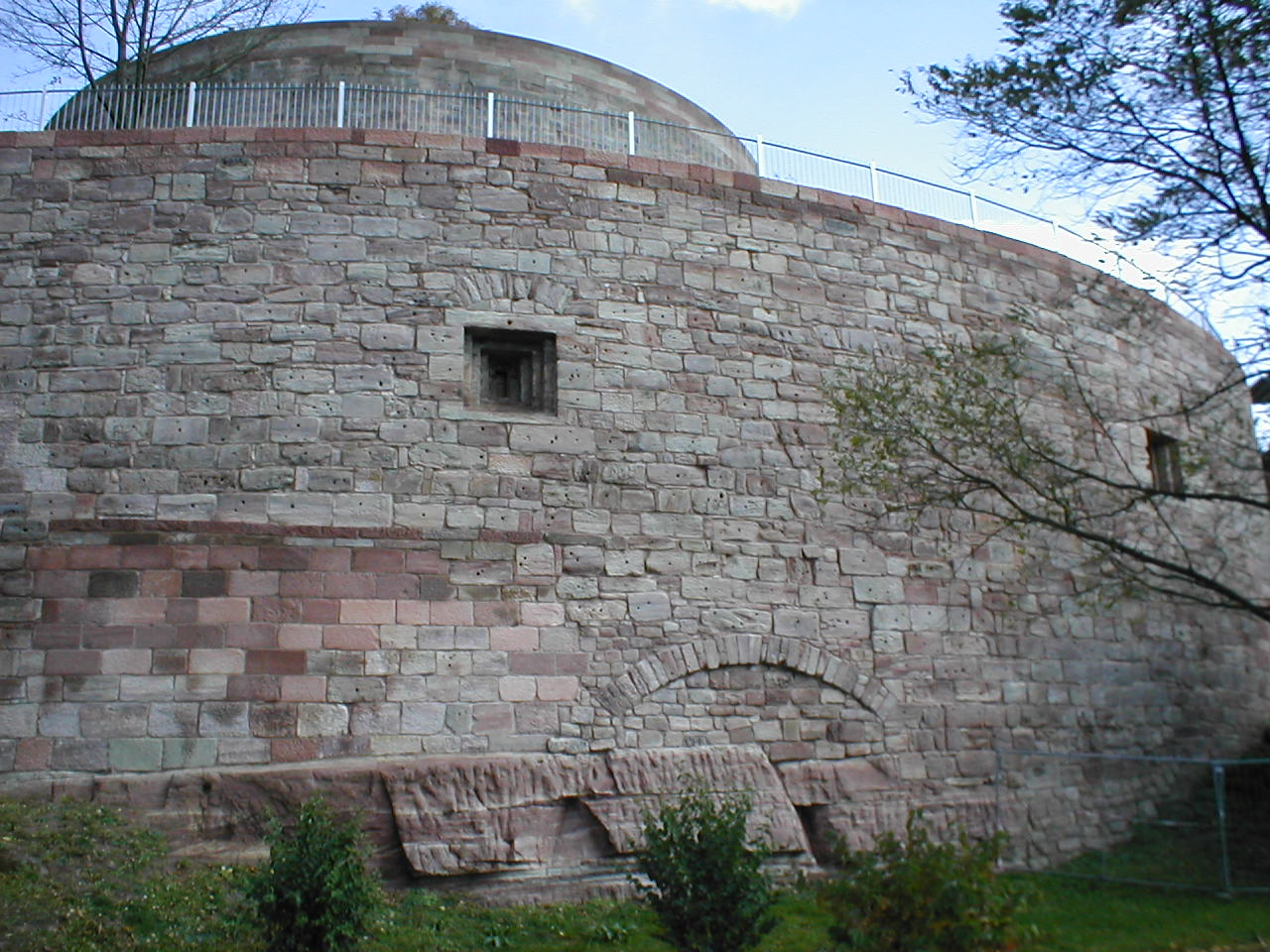
View of the outer west roundel of the Plassenburg with gunports and the inner west roundel positioned within it

At the fortress of Plassenburg in Kulmbach there are two "staggered" roundels. One is a high, inner, roundel built within a much larger outer roundel. This construction is one of the largest surviving roundel works in Germany. The inner and outer roundels house two gun decks, which meant that a staggered roundel could generate a heavy weight of fire from four batteries. The fortress with its roundels was used by the army until the Napoleonic Wars in 1806. The two roundels in the west of the fortress were rebuilt after the place had been slighted in 1554 following the Second Margrave War, although by that time bastions had already superseded them. Subsequently, between 1557 and 1607, more bastions were added.

== Literature ==
- Olaf Wagener, Thomas Kühtreiber: Taktik und Raum. Vorwerke als Elemente des Burgenbaus im 15. und 15. Jahrhundert, in: Die Burg zur Zeit der Renaissance. Berlin, Munich, 2010, pp. 111–126, ISBN 978-3-422-07023-3.
- Stephan Hoppe: Artilleriewall und Bastion. Deutscher Festungsbau der Renaissancezeit im Spannungsfeld zwischen apparativer und medialer Funktion, in: Jülicher Geschichtsblätter, 74/75 (2006/2007), pp. 35–63.
- Burger, Daniel: Die Landesfestungen der Hohenzollern in Franken und Brandenburg, in: Die Plassenburg, Schriftenreihe für Heimatforschung und Kulturpflege in Ostfranken, Kulmbach, 2000.
- Horst W. Böhme, Reinhard Friedrich, Barbara Schock-Werner (ed.): Wörterbuch der Burgen, Schlösser und Festungen. Reclam, Stuttgart, 2004, ISBN 3-15-010547-1
- Hartwig Neumann: Festungsbau - Kunst und -Technik. Bechtermünz, Augsburg, 2000, ISBN 3-8289-0395-9.
