= Cremlingen =

- Municipality
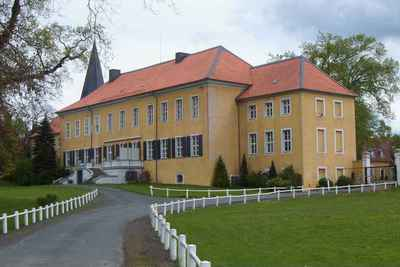
- Destedt Castle

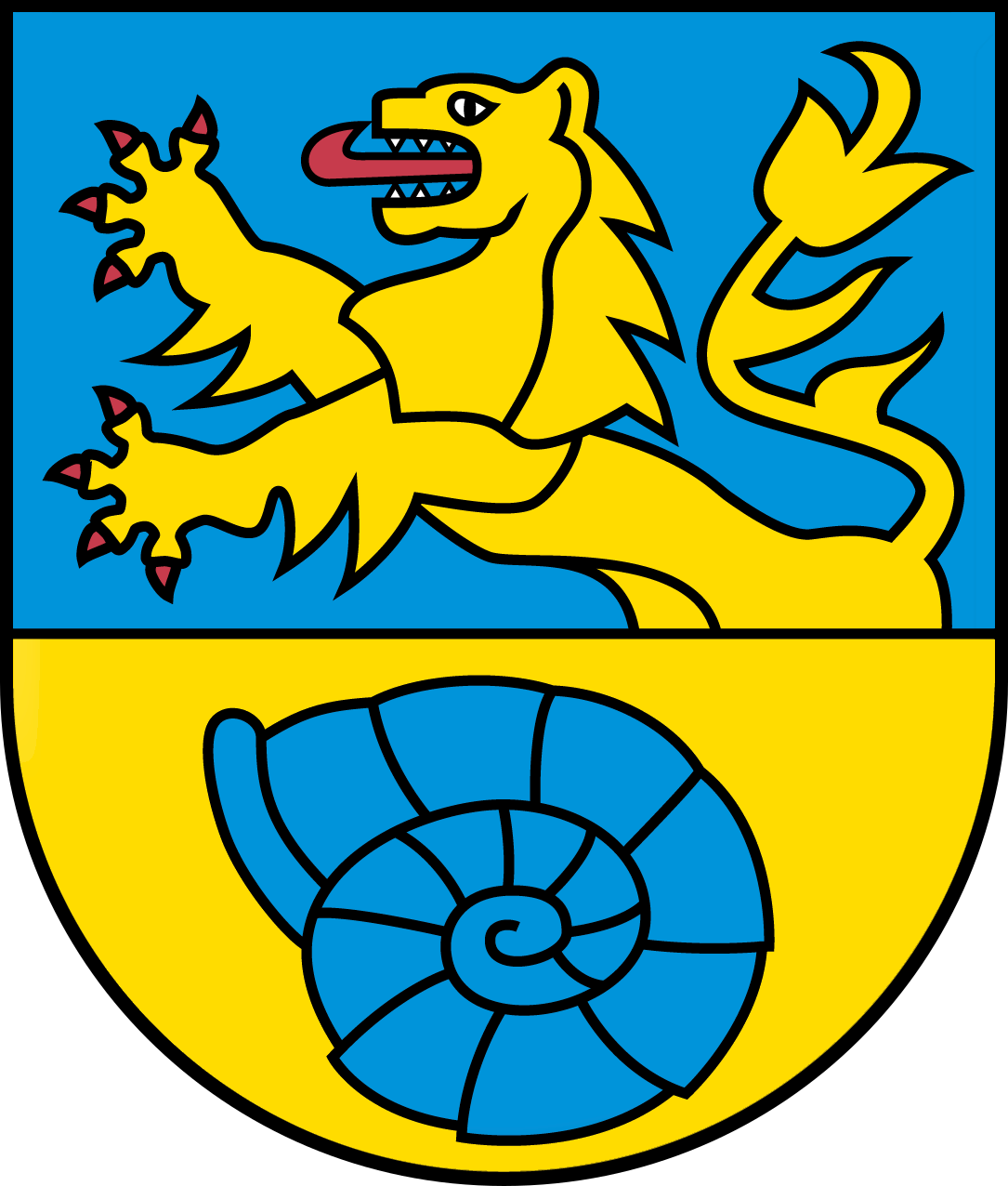
- Coat of arms

- Location of Cremlingen within Wolfenbüttel district
- Interactive map of Cremlingen
- Location within Germany Location within Lower Saxony
- Coordinates: 52°14′56″N 10°39′15″E
- Country: Germany
- State: Lower Saxony
- District: Wolfenbüttel

Government
  - Mayor (2021–26): Detlef Kaatz (SPD)

Area
  - Total: 59.49 km^{2} (22.97 sq mi)
- Elevation: 119 m (390 ft)

Population (2025-12-31)
  - Total: 12,783
  - Density: 214.9/km^{2} (556.5/sq mi)
- Time zone: UTC+01:00 (CET)
  - Summer (DST): UTC+02:00 (CEST)
- Postal codes: 38162
- Dialling codes: 05306
- Vehicle registration: WF
- Website: www.cremlingen.de

Cremlingen (German pronunciation: [ˈkʁɛmlɪŋən]) is a municipality in the district of Wolfenbüttel, Lower Saxony, Germany. It borders Lehre, Königslutter, Sickte, and Braunschweig. Parts of it are adjacent to the Elm hills.

== History ==
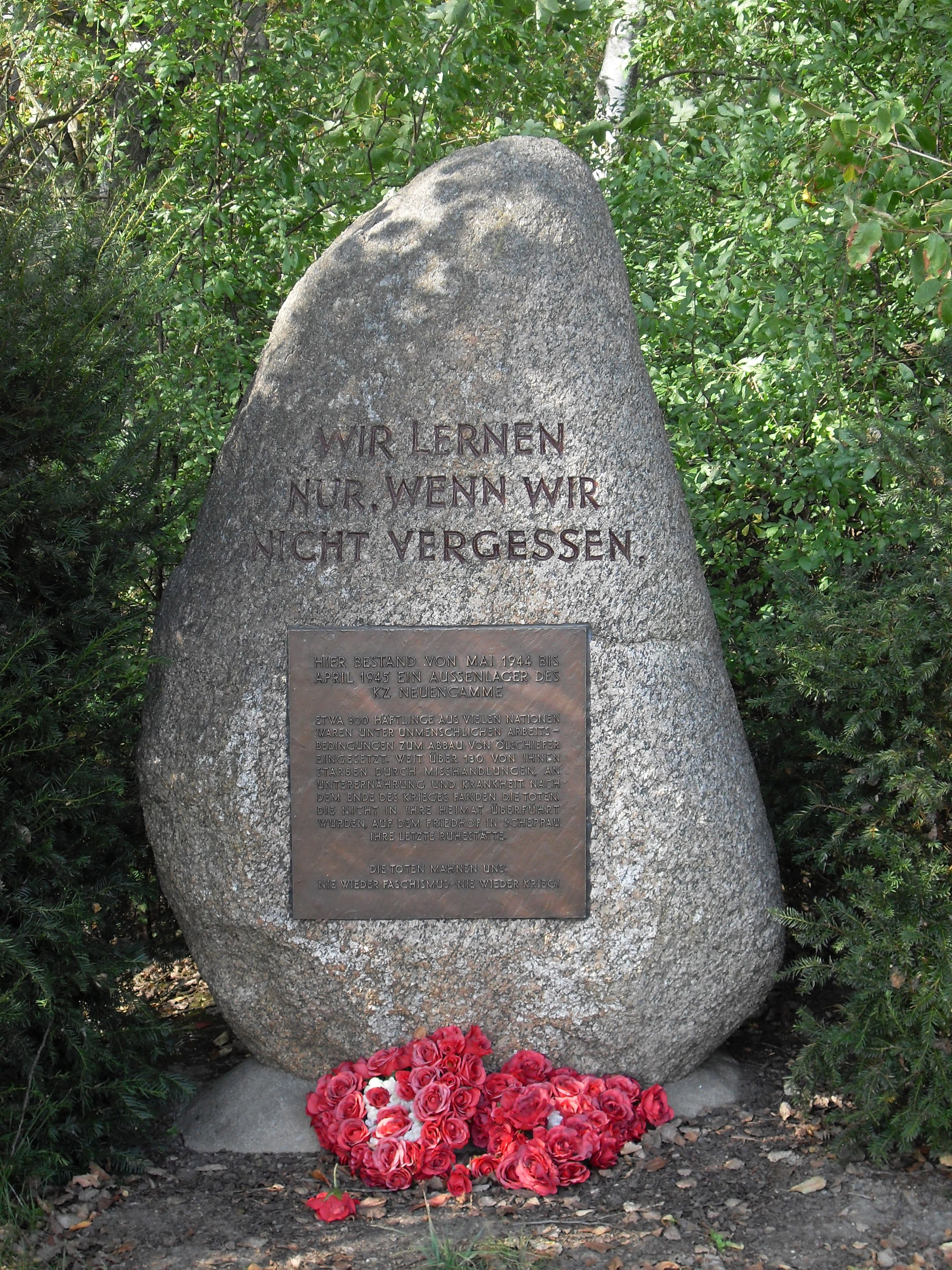
Stone monument at the site of the former concentration camp

From May 8, 1944 until April 12, 1945 a concentration camp was established in the quarter Schandelah. The camp was a subcamp to the Neuengamme concentration camp.

Until its deestablishment in 1974, the municipalities later merged into Cremlingen were part of the district of Braunschweig.

== Traffic ==
The municipality has 2 train stations in the towns of Schandelah and Weddel at the railroad from Braunschweig to Magdeburg; Weddel is also served by trains towards Wolfsburg (Weddel loop).

The Federal Highway 1 crosses the municipality from east to west, and since the end of September 2006 Cremlingen has a connection point to the Federal Motorway (Bundesautobahn 39), which offers quick connections both to Wolfsburg and Braunschweig.

== Division of the municipality ==
Cremlingen was established in 1974 by merging the former municipalities of

- Abbenrode
- Cremlingen
- Destedt
- Gardessen
- Hemkenrode
- Hordorf
- Klein Schöppenstedt
- Schandelah
- Schulenrode
- Weddel

== Notable places ==
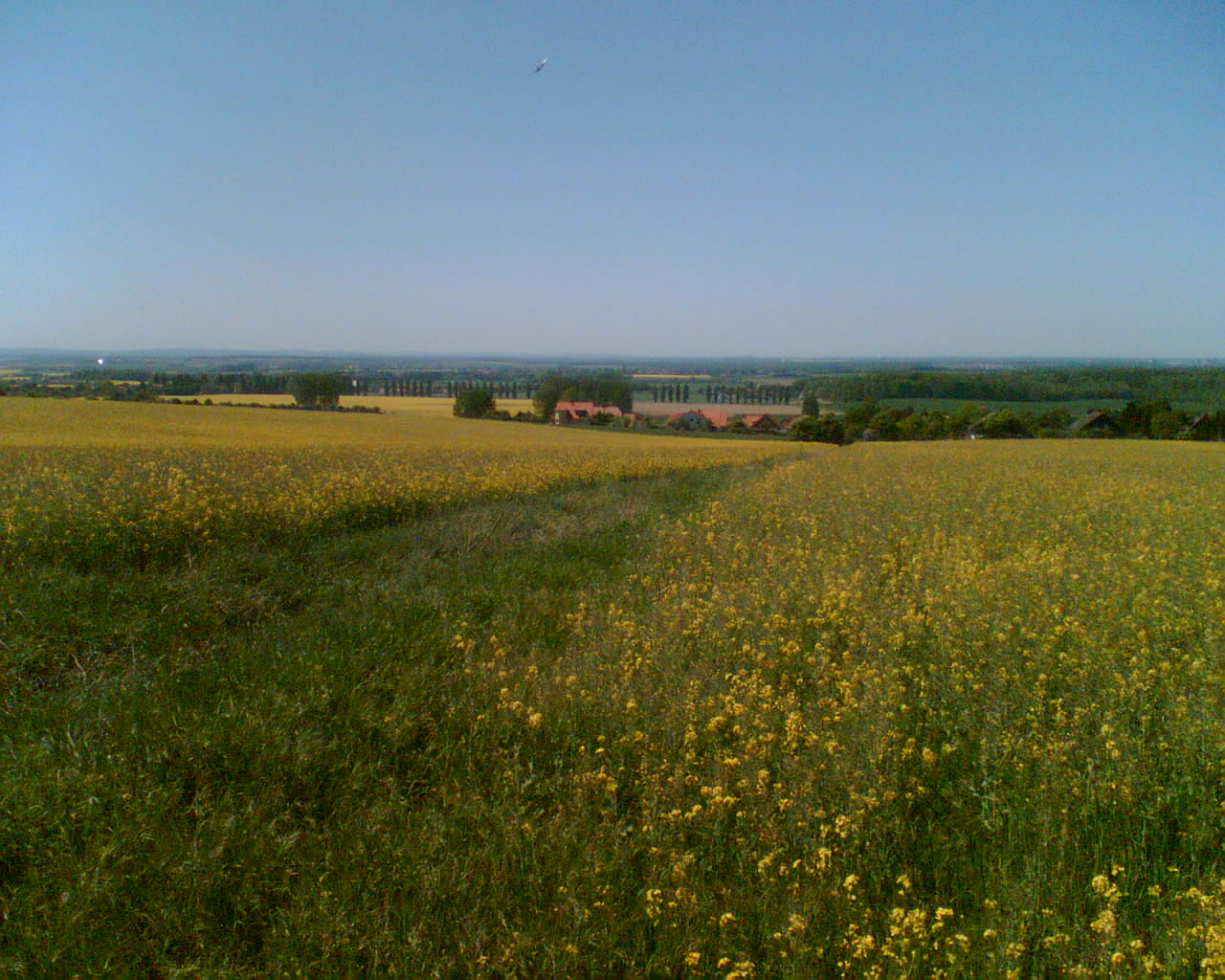
View from the Elm to the West

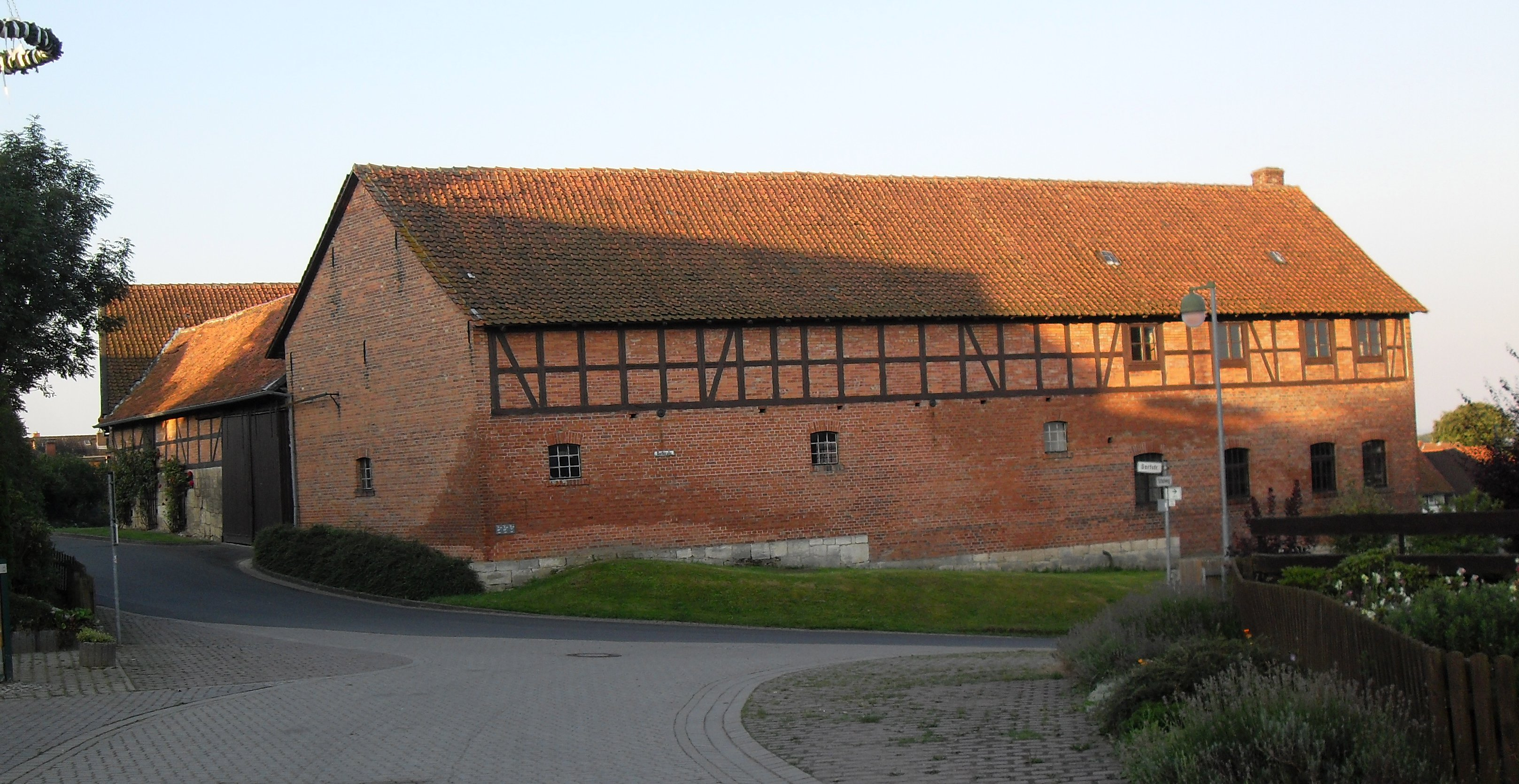
Historic farm building in Hemkenrode

Cremlingen hosts the Cremlingen transmitter, a major medium wave antenna used for broadcasting Deutschlandfunk.

== See also ==
- List of subcamps of Neuengamme
- The Permanent Cure

== Notes ==
=== References ===
- Official German list of concentration camps Verzeichnis der Konzentrationslager und ihrer Außenkommandos (in German)
