= Braunschweig (district) =

Coordinates: 52°16′12″N 10°31′12″E

Landkreis Braunschweig
- District
- Coat of arms
- Country: Germany
- State: Lower Saxony
- Disbanded: 28 February 1974
- Capital: Braunschweig

Area
  - Total: 46,244 km^{2} (17,855 sq mi)

Population (1969)
  - Total: 94,100
- Time zone: UTC+01:00 (CET)
  - Summer (DST): UTC+02:00 (CEST)
- Vehicle registration: BS

Braunschweig or Landkreis Braunschweig was a district in Lower Saxony, Germany. The administrative centre of the district was the independent city of Braunschweig, which, however, was not part of the district itself.

The district was disbanded on 28 February 1974, as part of a district reform in Lower Saxony. The main part of the district was incorporated into the city of Braunschweig, while smaller parts were merged into the districts of Helmstedt, Peine, and Wolfenbüttel.

At the time of its disestablishment, the district consisted of:

- the municipalities of Abbenrode, Alvesse, Beienrode, Bettmar, Bevenrode, Bienrode, Bodenstedt, Bortfeld, Broitzem, Cremlingen, Denstorf, Destedt, Dibbesdorf, Duttenstedt, Erkerode, Essehof, Essenrode, Essinghausen, Flechtorf, Fürstenau, Gardessen, Groß-Brunsrode, Groß-Gleidingen, Harvesse, Hemkenrode, Hötzum, Hondelage, Hordorf, Klein-Brunsrode, Klein-Gleidingen, Klein-Schöppenstedt, Köchingen, Lamme, Lehre, Liedingen, Lucklum, Mascherode, Meerdorf, Neubrück, Niedersickte, Obersickte, Rautheim, Rüningen, Schandelah, Schapen, Schulenrode, Sierße, Sonnenberg, Sophiental, Stöckheim bei Braunschweig, Thune, Timmerlah, Vallstedt, Vechelade, Vechelde, Veltheim (Ohe), Völkenrode, Volkmarode, Waggum, Wahle, Watenbüttel, Weddel, Wedtlenstedt, Wendeburg, Wenden, Wendezelle, Wendhausen, Wierthe, and Zweidorf
- the unincorporated areas of Beienrode, Buchhorst, Essehof I, Essehof II, Essehof III, Meerdorfer Holz, Querum, Sophiental I, Sophiental II, and Wendhausen.

The exclave of Thedinghausen had already been incorporated into the district of Verden in 1972.
