= Mittelriede =

River in Germany

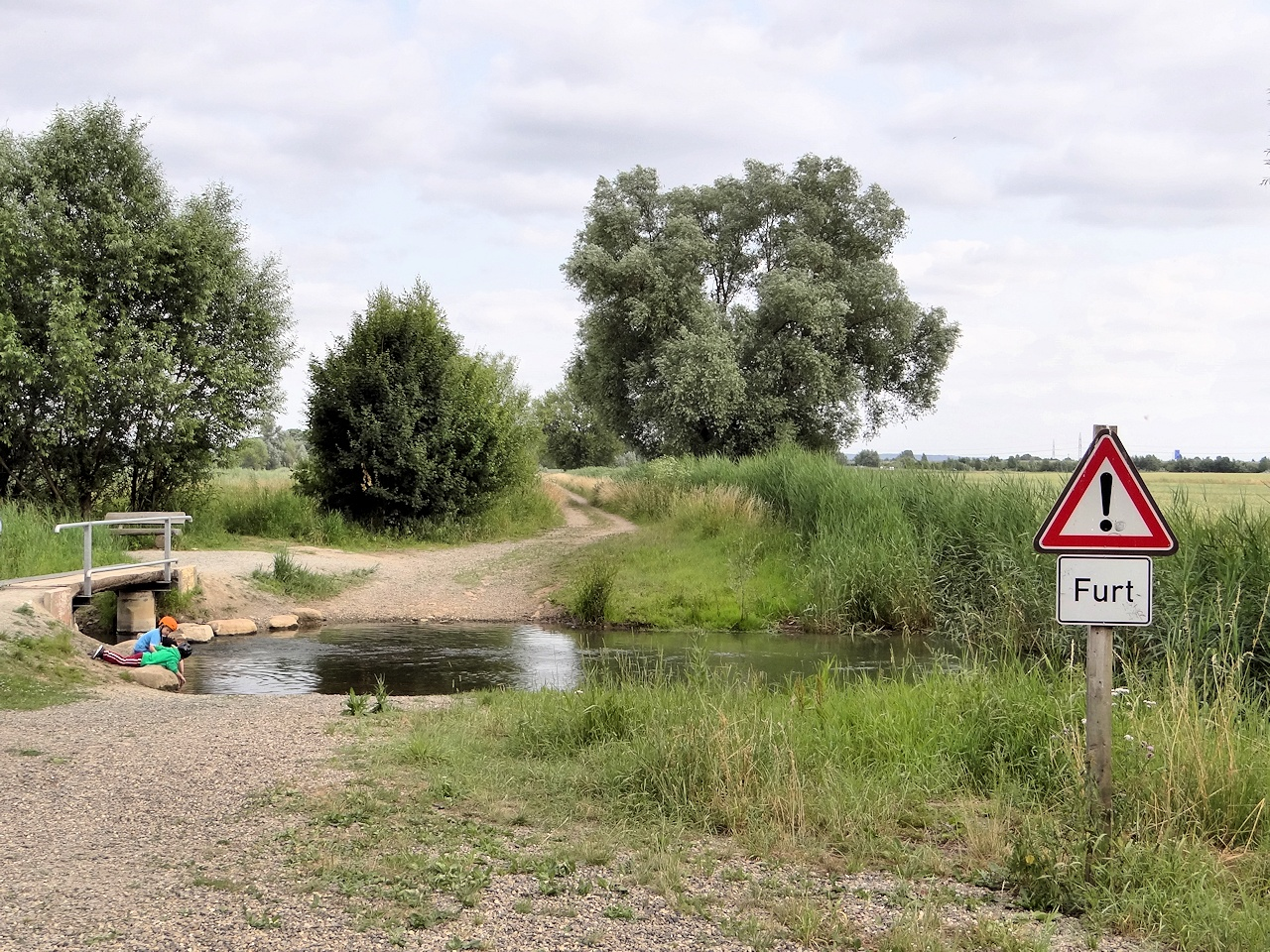

Location
- Country: Germany
- States: Lower Saxony

Physical characteristics
- Source
  - location: Wabe
- Mouth
  - location: Schunter
  - coordinates: 52.2973°N 10.5478°E

Basin features
- Progression: Schunter→ Oker→ Aller→ Weser→ North Sea

Mittelriede is a small river of Lower Saxony, Germany. It is an artificial branch of the Wabe near Braunschweig. It runs parallel to the Wabe, and discharges into the Schunter 300 m downstream from the mouth of the Wabe.

== See also ==
- List of rivers of Lower Saxony
