= Dieter Schidor =

German actor (1948–1987)

- Born: 6 March 1948; Bienrode, Germany
- Died: 17 September 1987 (aged 39); Munich, Germany
- Occupation: Actor

Dieter Schidor (6 March 1948 – 17 September 1987) was a German actor, perhaps best known for his work in Sam Peckinpah's Cross of Iron, and Rainer Werner Fassbinder's Querelle.

Dieter Schidor was born on 6 March 1948 in Bienrode, today a part of Braunschweig, Germany. From 1977 to 1986, Schidor lived with the New Zealand actor and producer Michael McLernon, until his death from AIDS. Schidor died from AIDS on 17 September 1987 in Munich.

== Filmography ==
| Year | Title | Role | Notes |
|---|---|---|---|
| 1970 | Piggies | | |
| 1971 | Das ehrliche Interview | | |
| 1973 | Little Funny Guy | | |
| 1973 | Pan | | |
| 1974 | Inki | | |
| 1974 | Schattenreiter | Karl | TV movie |
| 1975 | Un sac de billes | German soldier | |
| 1976 | Black and White in Color | Hauptmann Kraft | |
| 1976 | Satan's Brew | Willy | Uncredited |
| 1977 | Cross of Iron | Anselm | |
| 1977 | Group Portrait with a Lady | Kurt Hoyser | |
| 1977 | Death or Freedom | Bartel | |
| 1978 | The Tailor from Ulm | Schlumberger | |
| 1979 | Son of Hitler | Sommer | |
| 1979 | Breakthrough | Cpl. Paul Anselm | |
| 1979 | Womanlight | Sven Svensson | |
| 1980 | The Formula | Assassin | |
| 1980 | Der Mann, der sich in Luft auflöste | Embassy Secretary | |
| 1981 | Heute spielen wir den Boß | Rothe | |
| 1982 | Veronika Voss | Kripobeamter | Uncredited |
| 1982 | Brandmale | Walter | |
| 1982 | Querelle | Vic Rivette | |
| 1983 | Schnelles Geld | | |
| 1984 | Der Havarist | | |
| 1984 | Drama in blond | Lore | |
| 1985 | Kalt in Kolumbien | | |
| 1985 | Beethoven's Nephew | | |
| 1985 | Georgenberg | | |
| 1985 | Tamboo | | |
| 1986 | Nur Frauen, kein Leben | | |
| 1986 | Die Liebeswüste | | |
| 1986 | Unvermeidbarer Zufall - Der Junge nebenan | Dieter | |
| 1986 | Mino | Yaroslav Vavra | TV miniseries |
| 1987 | Terminus | The Doctor's assistant | |
| 1987 | Ätherrausch | Narrator | |
| 1988 | Verbieten verboten | Dieter Schidor | (Ep. 'Die Peep Show ist tot, es lebe die Peep Show'), (final film role) |
