= Wabe-Schunter-Beberbach =

- Borough of Braunschweig
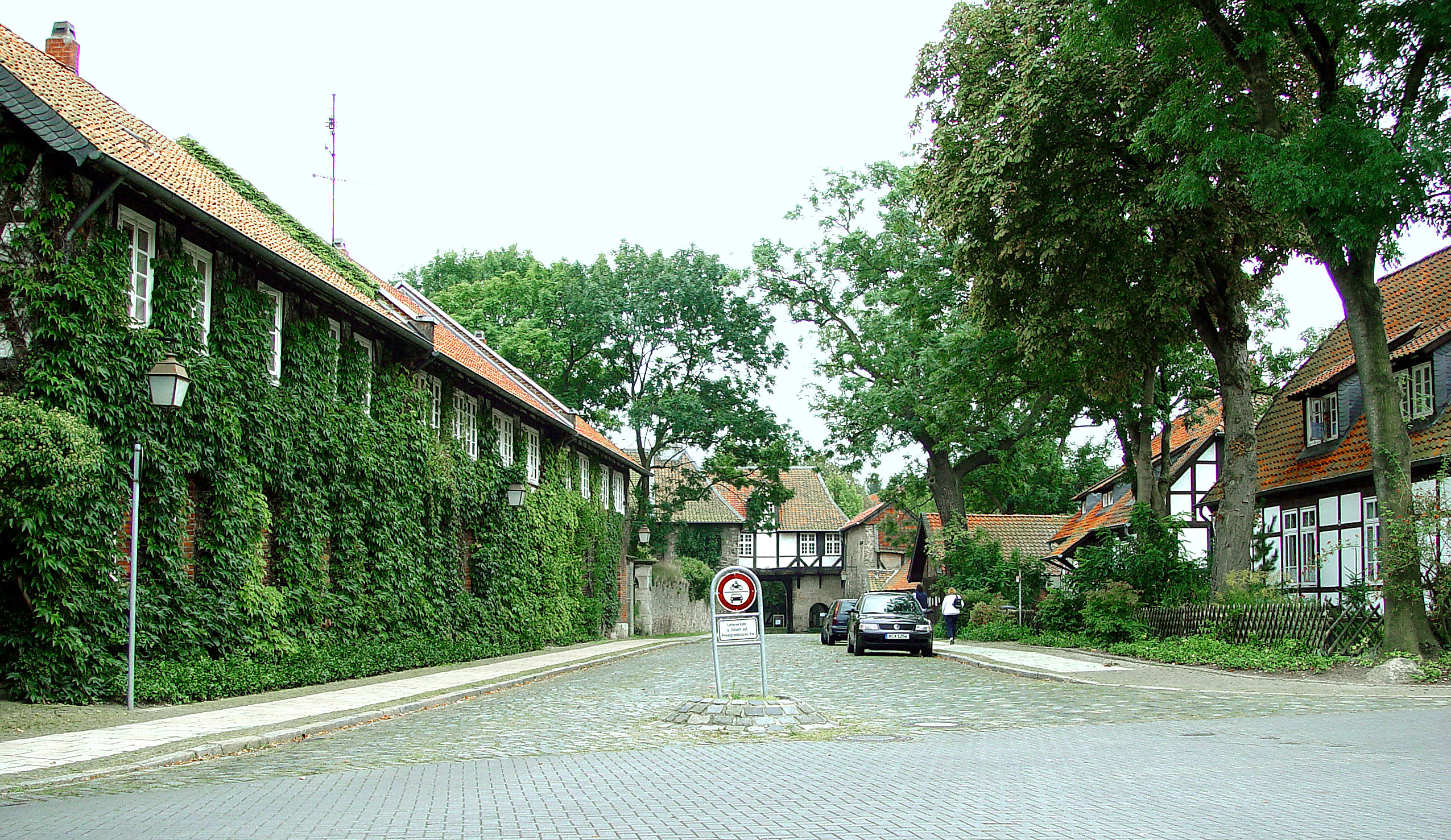
- Riddagshausen

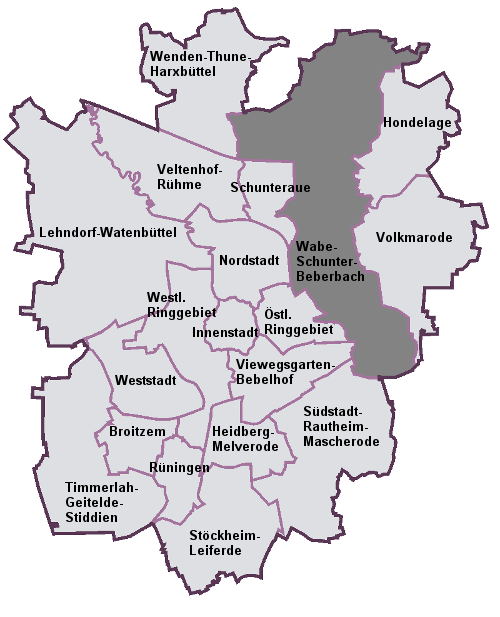
- Location of Wabe-Schunter-Beberbach within Braunschweig
- Interactive map of Wabe-Schunter-Beberbach
- Location within Germany Location within Lower Saxony
- Coordinates: 52°16′50″N 10°33′37″E
- Country: Germany
- State: Lower Saxony
- District: urban district
- City: Braunschweig

Government
  - Mayor: Gerhard Stülten (SPD)

Area
  - Total: 30.568 km^{2} (11.802 sq mi)

Population (2020-12-31)
  - Total: 20,204
  - Density: 660.95/km^{2} (1,711.9/sq mi)
- Time zone: UTC+01:00 (CET)
  - Summer (DST): UTC+02:00 (CEST)
- Postal codes: 38104-38110
- Dialling codes: 0531
- Vehicle registration: BS

Wabe-Schunter-Beberbach is a Stadtbezirk (borough) in the north-eastern and eastern part of Braunschweig, Germany. The district is named after the river Schunter and its tributaries Wabe and Beberbach.

The Stadtbezirk comprises the quarters Bevenrode, Bienrode, Gliesmarode, Riddagshausen, Querum, and Waggum.

== History ==
The district was formed in 2011 out of the former districts of Wabe-Schunter and Bienrode-Waggum-Bevenrode. Both districts consisted of villages that were incorporated into Braunschweig during the 20th century in two waves, in 1934 (Gliesmarode, Querum, and Riddagshausen) and in 1974 (Bevenrode, Bienrode, and Waggum).

== Main sights ==
- Riddagshausen Abbey (German: Kloster Riddagshausen), a former Cistercian monastery, with the surrounding nature reserve and arboretum, as well as the village of Riddagshausen with several old farm houses. The nature reserve Riddagshäuser Teiche is designated as Important Bird Area and Special Protection Area.
- The inn Grüner Jäger ("Green Huntsman") in Riddagshausen, built in the mid-18th century.
- The 12th century Church of the Holy Trinity (German: Zur Heiligen Dreifaltigkeit) in Bienrode.
- The 12th century Church St. Peter and Paul in Bevenrode.
- The Gliesmaroder Turm, formerly a tower in the medieval fortifications of Braunschweig which was torn down in the 18th century and replaced with an inn of the same name which still stands.
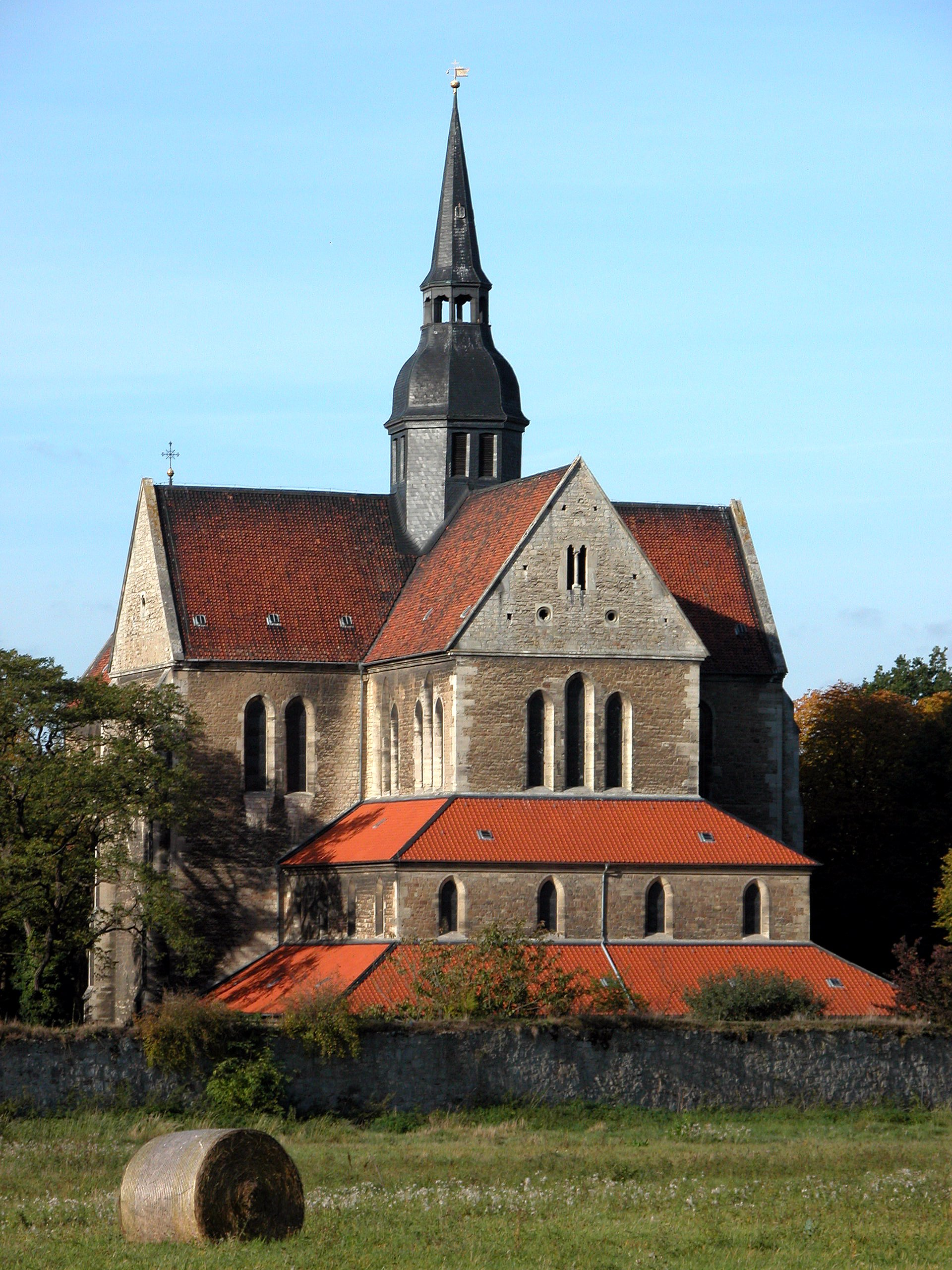
Riddagshausen Abbey

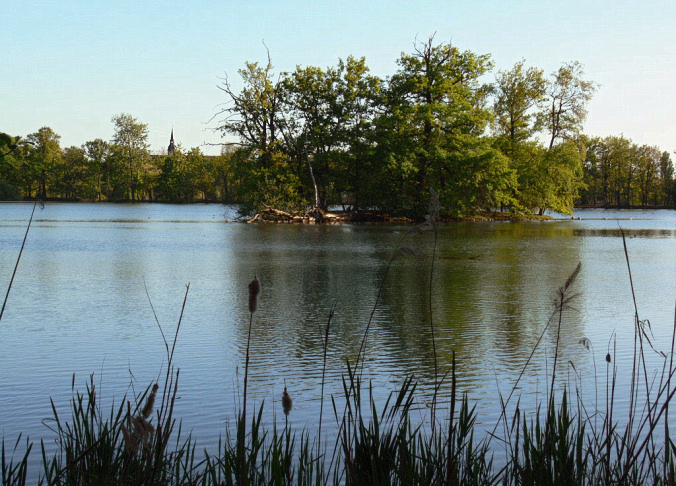
Riddagshausen nature reserve

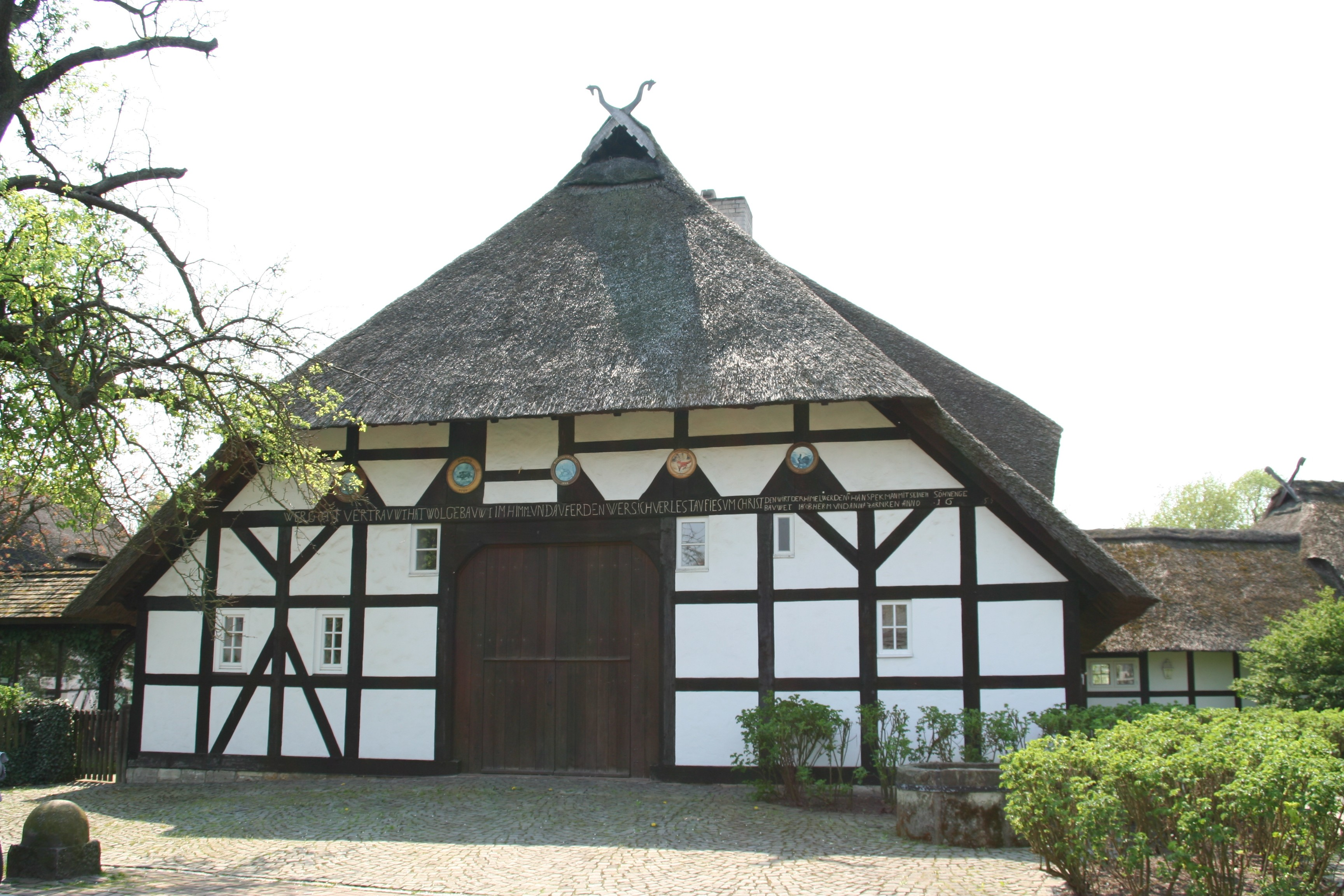
Farm house in Riddagshausen

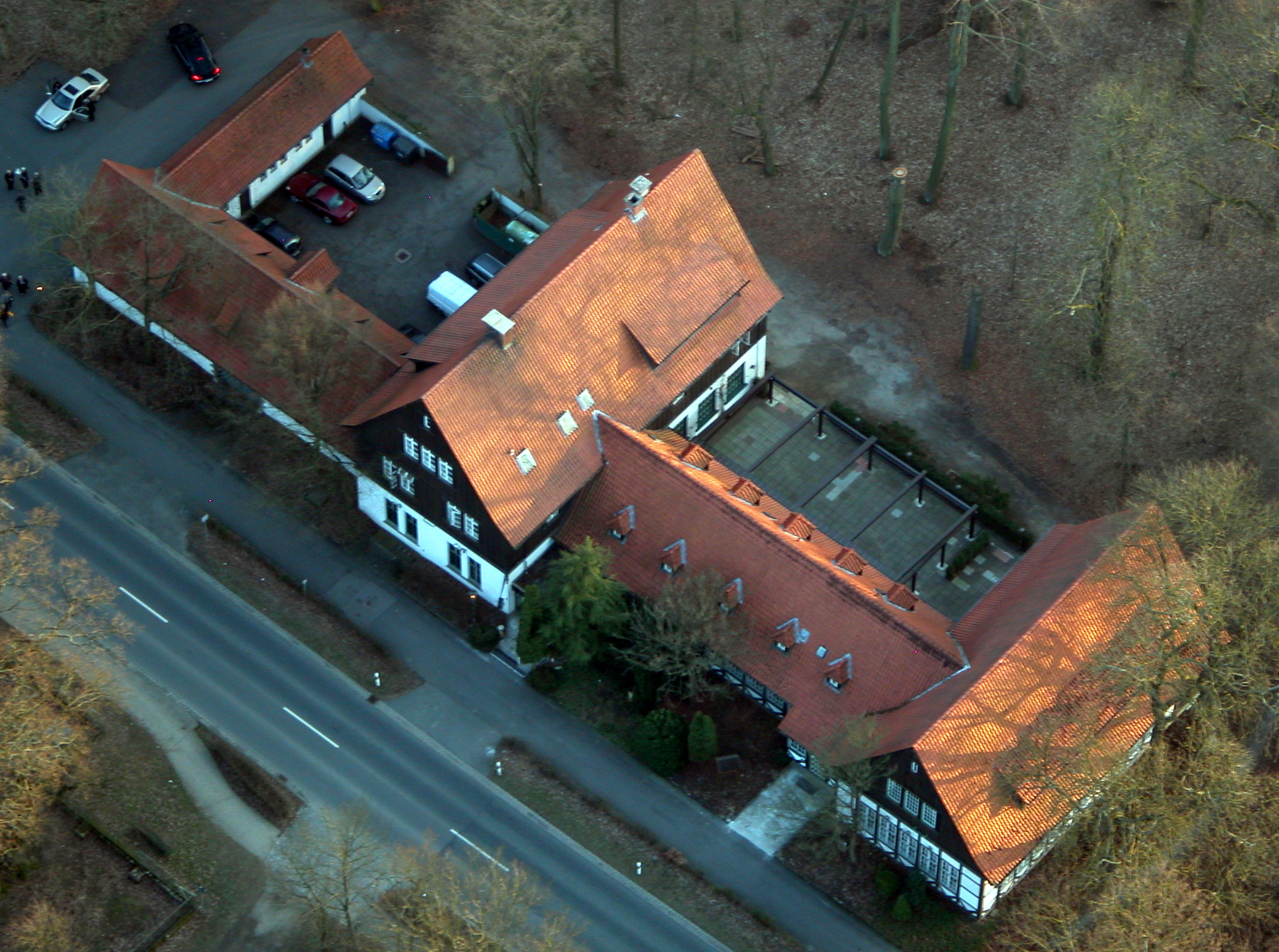
Grüner Jäger

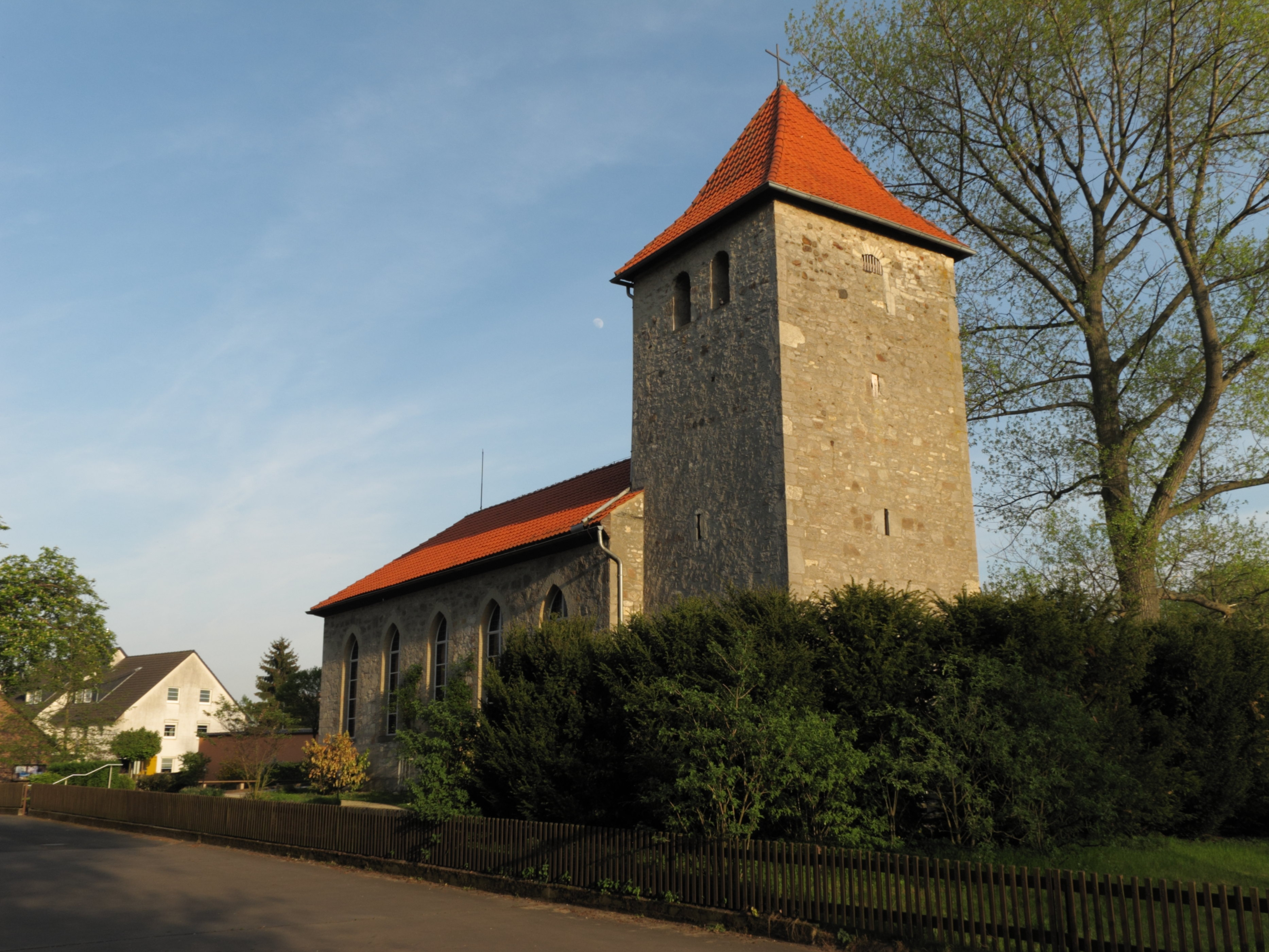
Church of the Holy Trinity

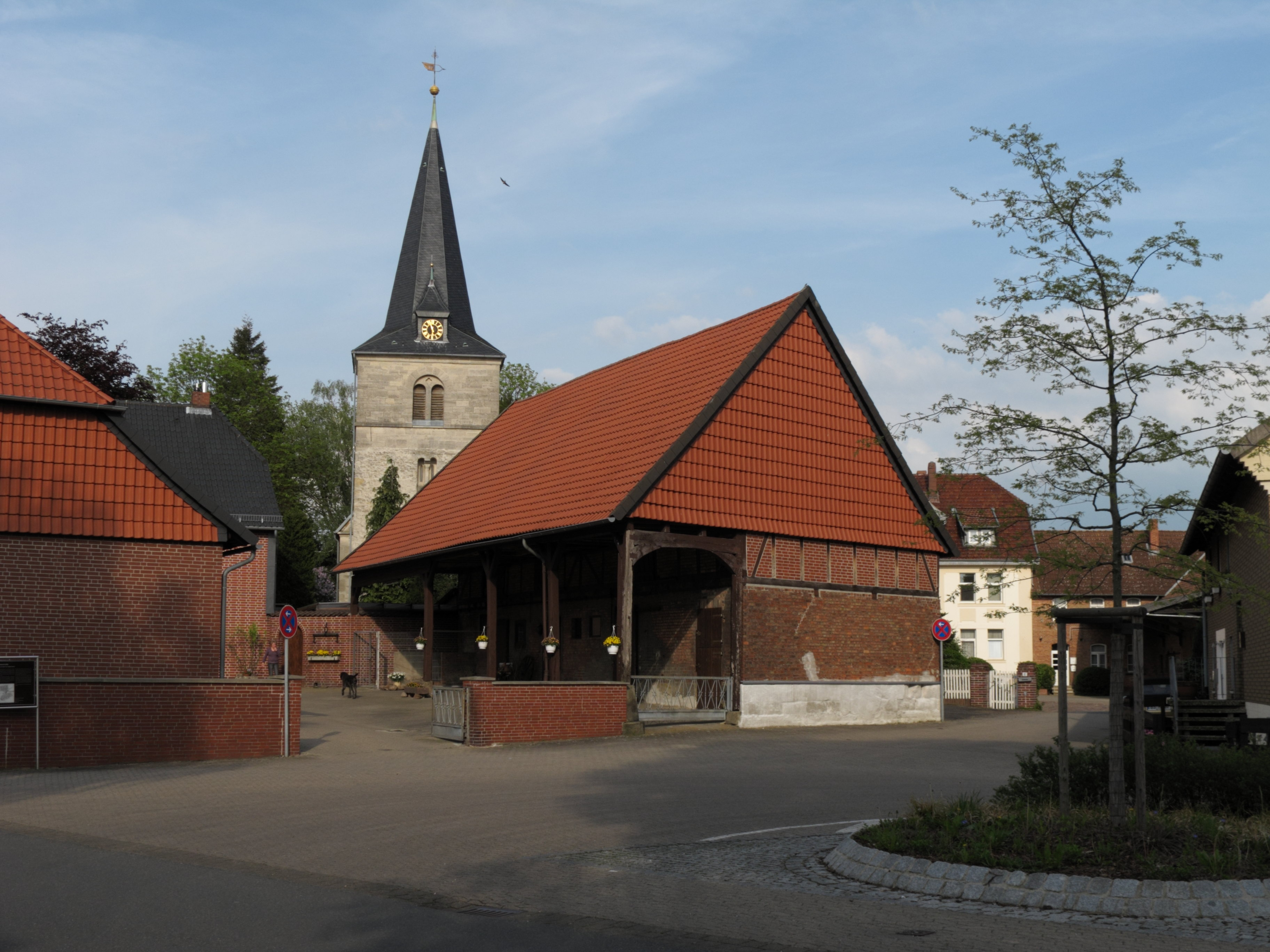
Bevenrode with St. Peter and Paul

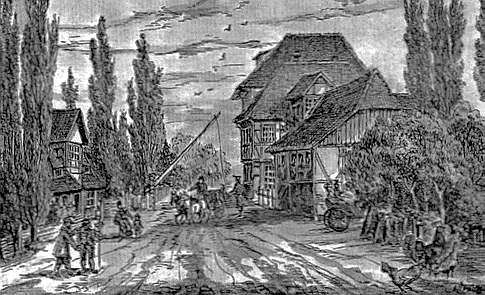
Gliesmaroder Turm in the 19th century

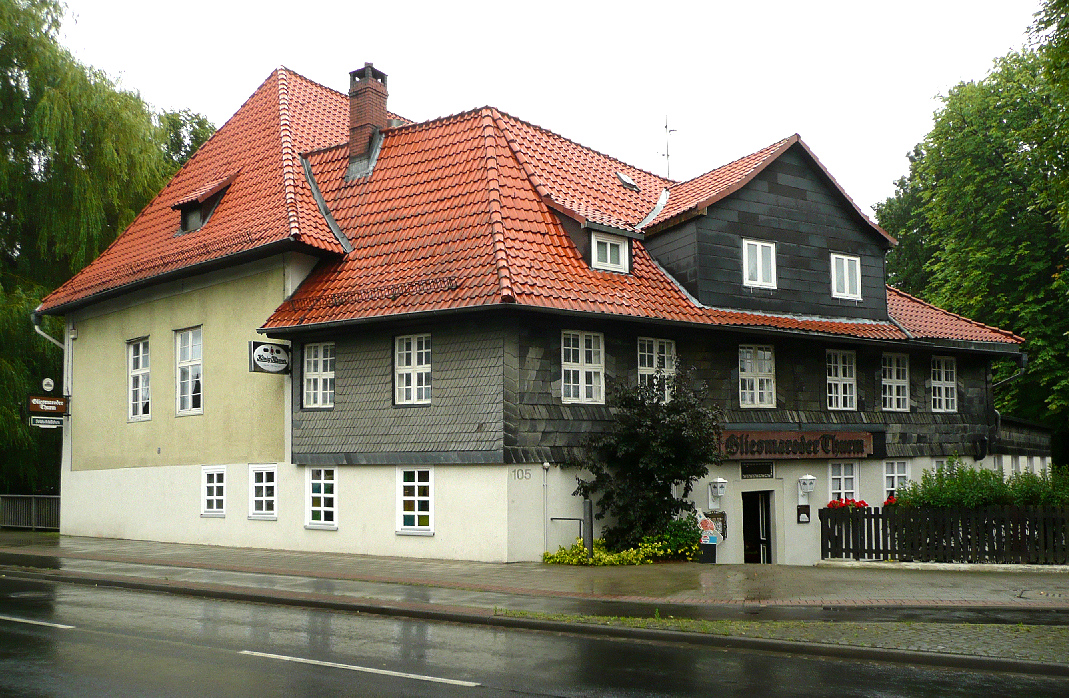
Gliesmaroder Turm in 2011

== Politics ==
The district mayor Gerhard Stülten is a member of the Social Democratic Party of Germany.

== Transport ==
=== Train ===
Braunschweig-Gliesmarode station is located on the Brunswick–Uelzen railway line, which connects the district with Braunschweig Central Station and several towns in the Lüneburg Heath.

Line	Route	Frequency
RB	Braunschweig – Gifhorn – Wittingen – Uelzen	Every two hours

=== Air ===
The Braunschweig Airport (BWE / EDVE) is located near Waggum at 52°19′N 10°33′E, elev. 295 ft (90 m)

== Coats of arms ==
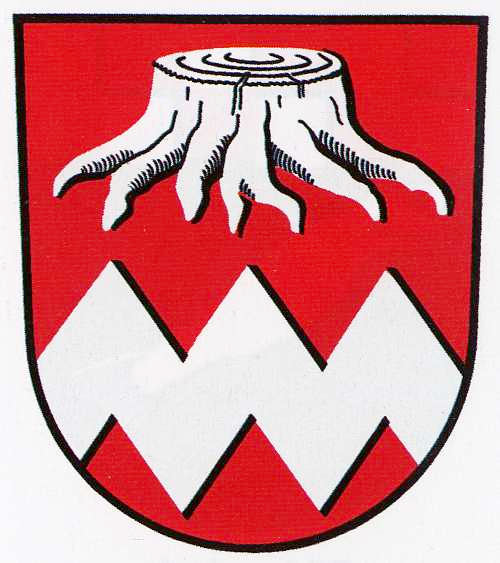
Coat of arms of Bevenrode

Coat of arms of Bienrode

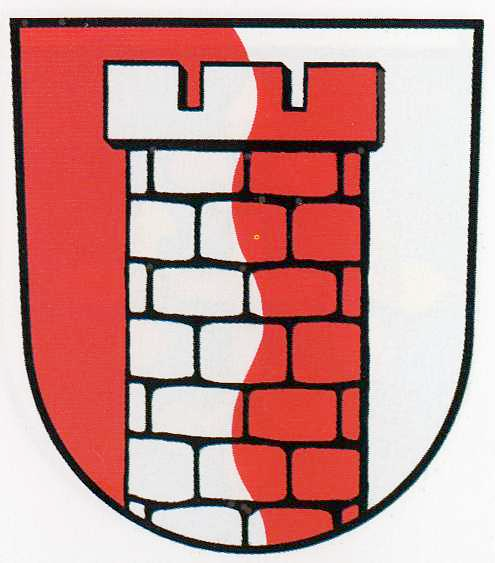
Coat of arms of Gliesmarode

Coat of arms of Querum

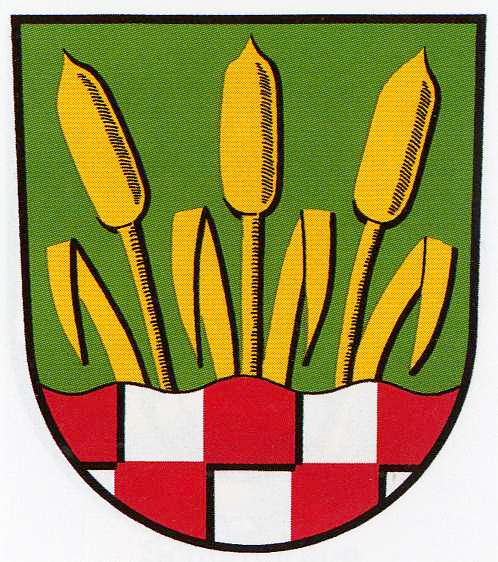
Coat of arms of Riddagshausen

Coat of arms of Waggum
