= Beberbach =

Beberbach may refer to:

- Beberbach (Humme), a river of North Rhine-Westphalia and Lower Saxony, Germany, tributary of the Humme
- Beberbach (Schunter), a river of Lower Saxony, Germany, tributary of the Schunter
