= Elm (hills) =

Mountain range in Lower Saxony, Germany

Coordinates: 52°11′57″N 10°44′10″E

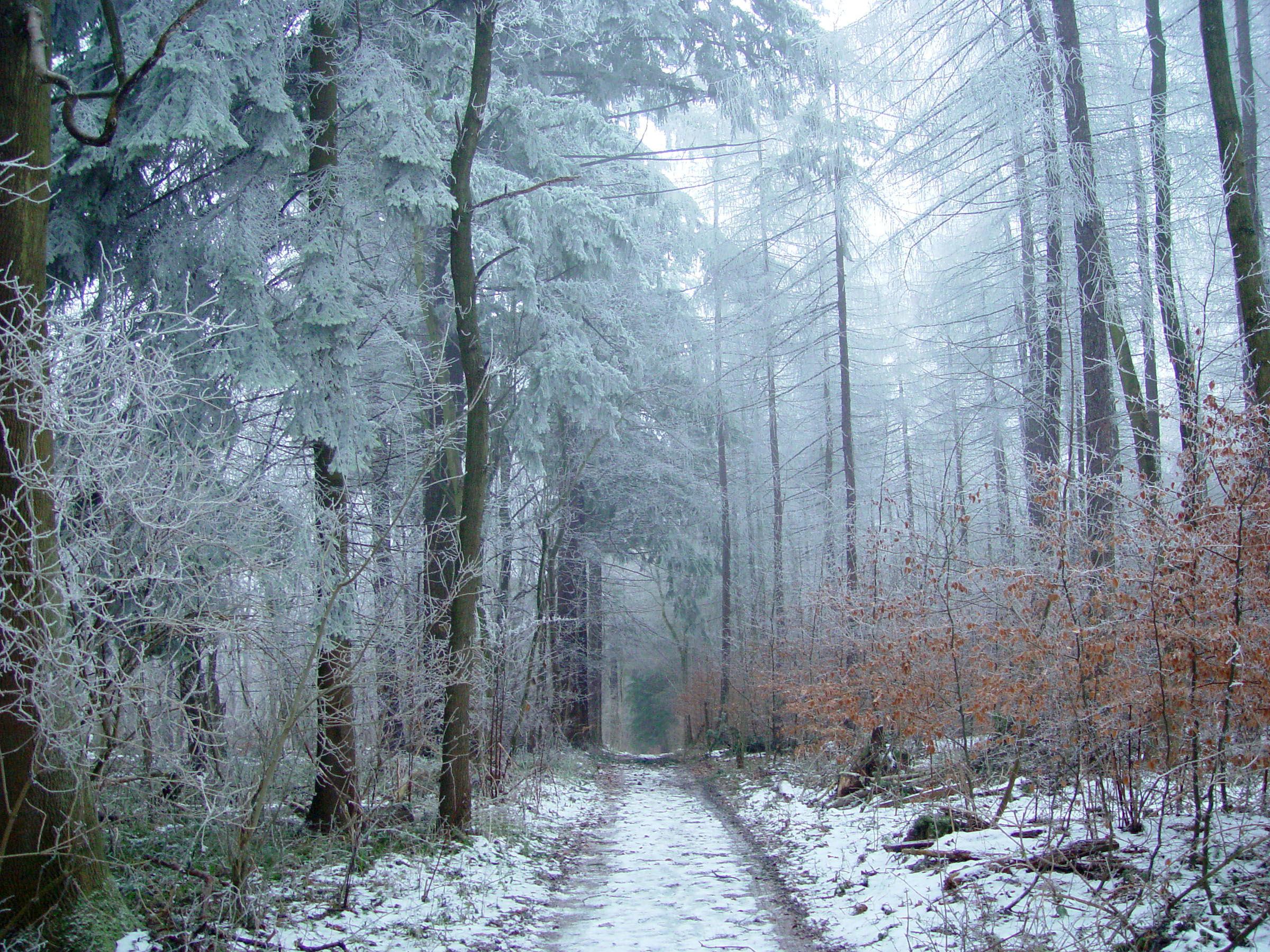
- Elm in winter

Highest point
- Peak: Eilumer Horn
- Elevation: 323 m (1,060 ft)

Geography
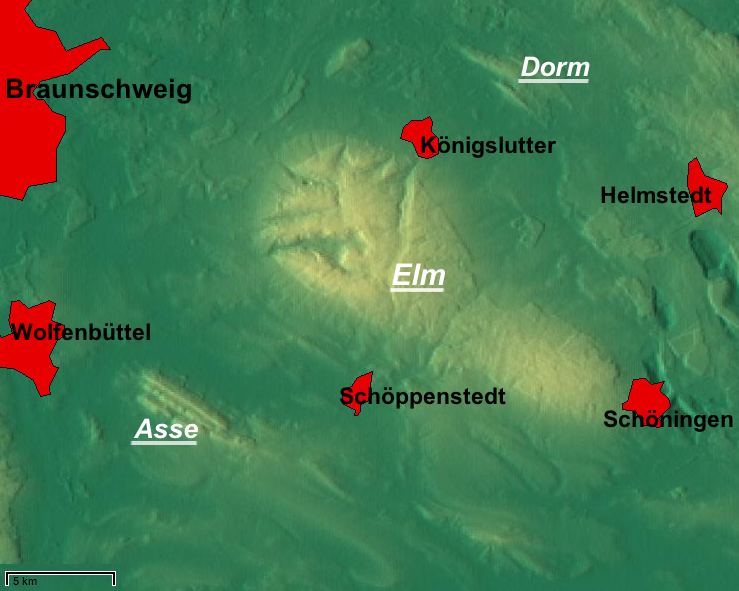
- Country: Germany
- Region: Lower Saxony

Geology
- Orogeny: Triassic
- Rock type: Muschelkalk limestone

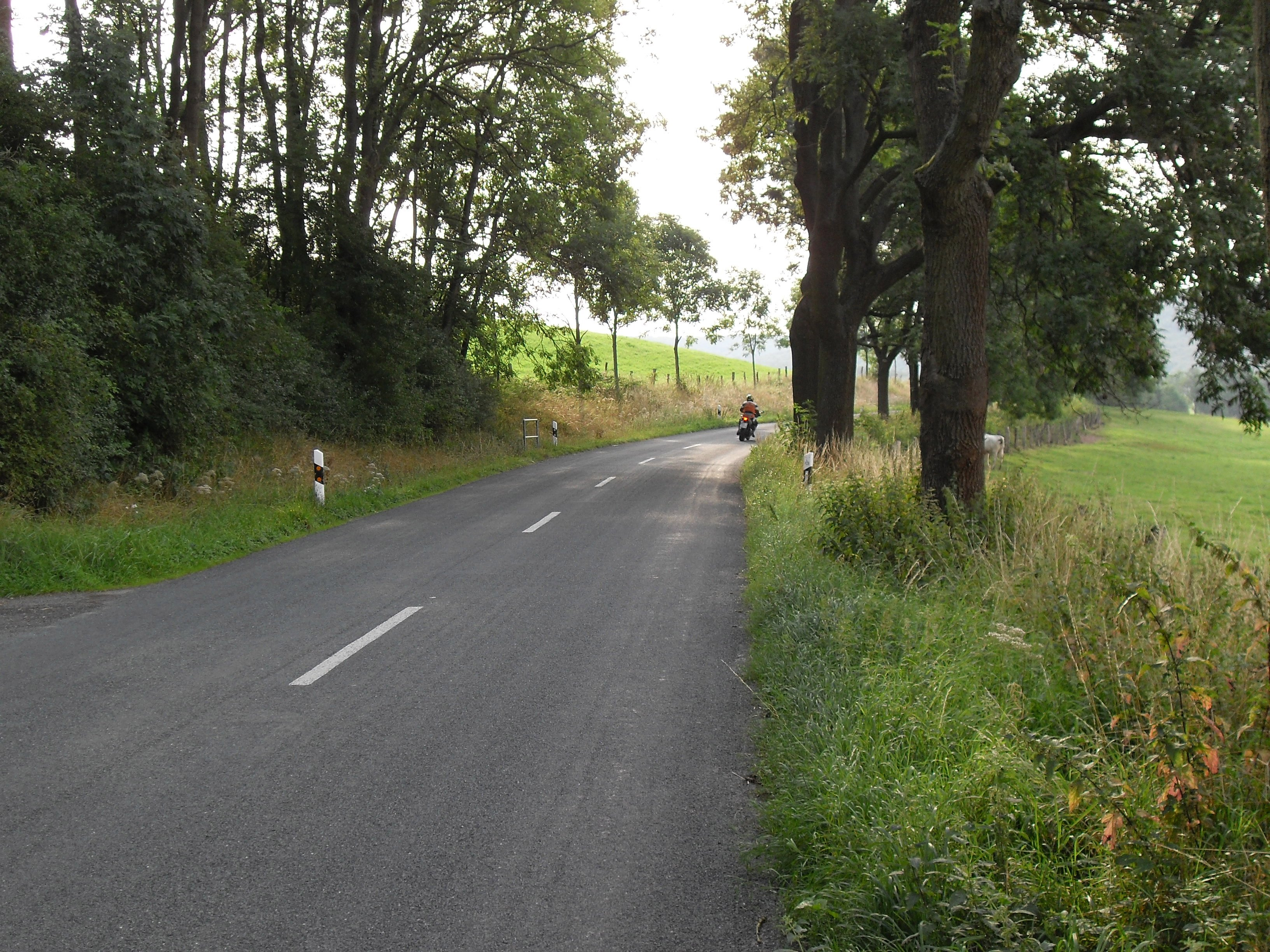
The Elm range is a popular area for motor cyclists

The Elm (German pronunciation: [ɛlm]) is a range of hills north of the Harz mountains in the Helmstedt and Wolfenbüttel districts of Lower Saxony, Germany. It has a length of about 25 km (16 mi) and a width of 3–8 km (1.9–5.0 mi) and rises to an elevation of 323 meters. Surrounded by the Northern European Lowlands, the Elm is almost uninhabited and the largest beech forest in Northern Germany. The hills are of a triassic limestone called Elmkalkstein. Together with the neighbouring Lappwald range, the Elm has been a protected nature park since 1977.

The Elm is a popular among hikers, cyclists, and motor cyclists.

Rivers originating in the Elm include:

- Altenau
- Lutter
- Missaue
- Scheppau
- Schunter
- Wabe

Towns on the edge of the Elm include:

- Königslutter
- Schöningen
- Schöppenstedt

Elevations

- Eilumer Horn (323,3 m)
- Osterberg (c. 314 m)
- Drachenberg (c. 313 m)
- Burgberg (c. 311 m)
- Amplebener Berg (310 m)
- Kleiner Tafelberg (c. 302 m)
- Kiefelhorn (301 m)
- Großer Tafelberg (296 m)
- Warberg (290 m)
- Wolfsburger Kopf (289 m)

== Sources ==
- Heinz-Bruno Krieger: Elmsagen. Oeding, Braunschweig-Schöppenstedt 1967.
- Heinz Röhr: Der Elm. Oeding, Braunschweig-Schöppenstedt 1962.
- Media related to Elm (Lower Saxony) at Wikimedia Commons
