= Riddagshausen Abbey =

Monastery in Lower Saxony, Germany

Coordinates: 52°16′03″N 10°34′38″E

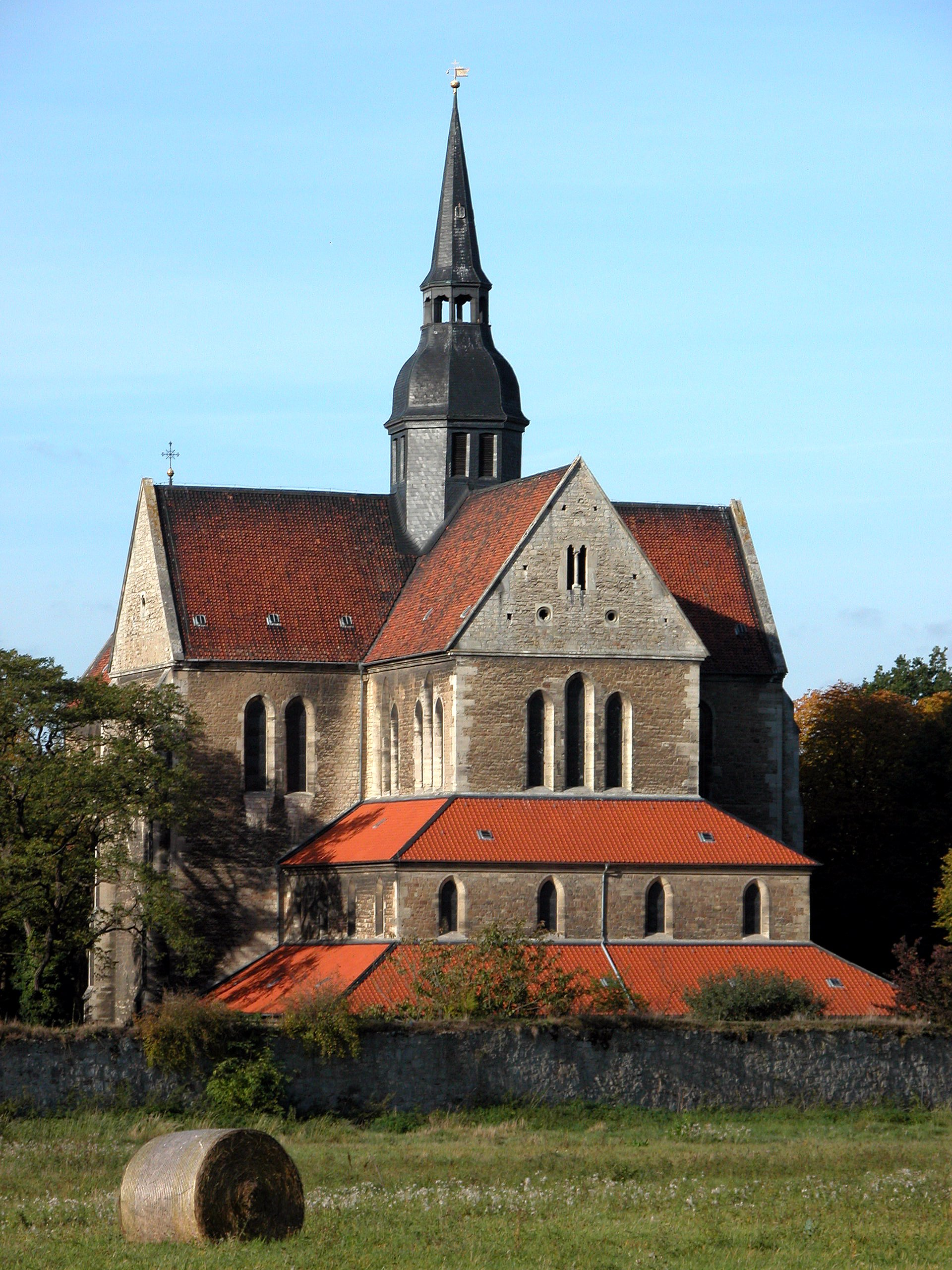
Riddagshausen Abbey

Riddagshausen Abbey (German: Kloster Riddagshausen) was a Cistercian monastery just outside the city of Brunswick in Germany.

== History ==
It was founded as Marienzelle by Ludolf the Wend, a ministerialis of Henry the Lion and steward of Brunswick, and settled in 1145 by monks from Amelungsborn Abbey. Henry endowed the new foundation in 1146 with the neighbouring village of Riddagshausen, from which it took its name.

The abbey early acquired reichsunmittelbar status as an Imperial abbey.

It was mediatised in 1569 by Brunswick-Wolfenbüttel, when it became a Protestant establishment. From 1690 it was also the home of a prestigious Lutheran seminary for training of preachers, the first in Germany. The religious community and the seminary were dissolved in 1809.

== Description ==
The site, now included within the city of Brunswick, in the district of Wabe-Schunter-Beberbach, is now mostly a nature reserve and arboretum. The nature reserve Riddagshäuser Teiche is designated as Important Bird Area and Special Protection Area.

The surviving buildings include the abbey church and the gatehouse, now home of the Cistercian Museum.

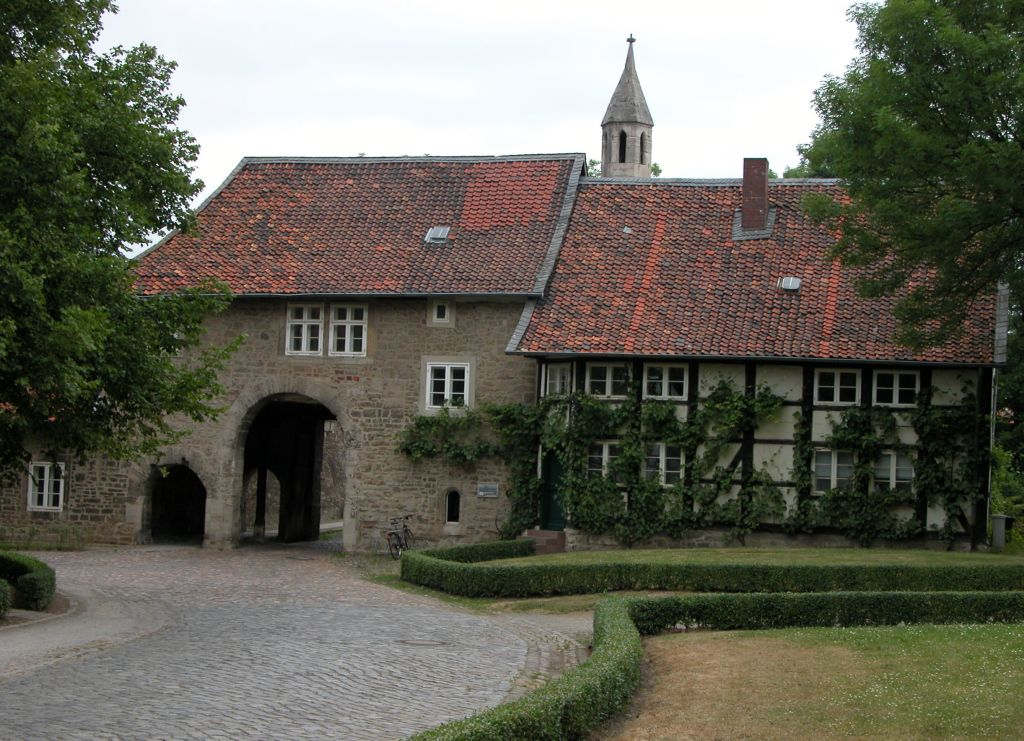
Gatehouse

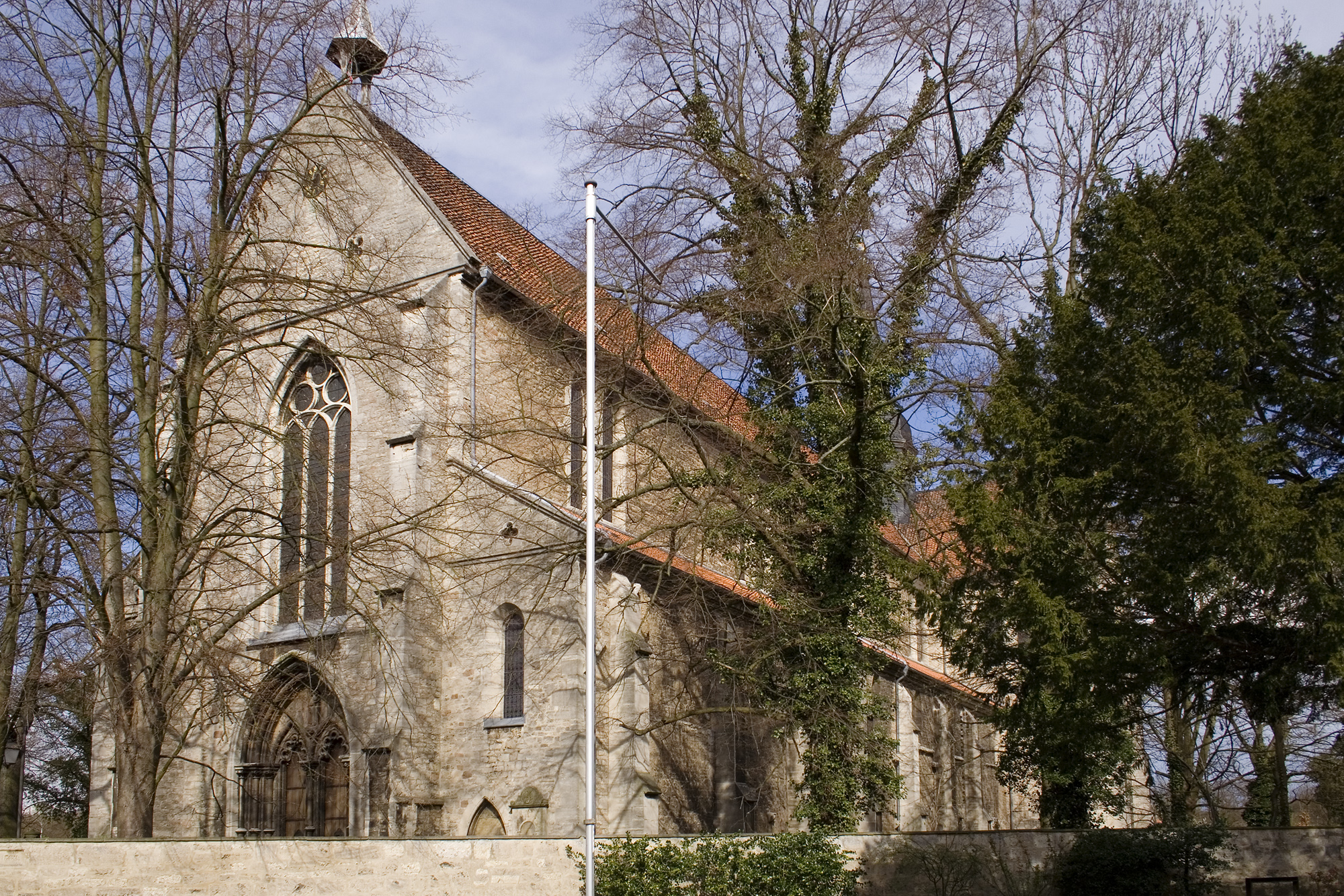
Church

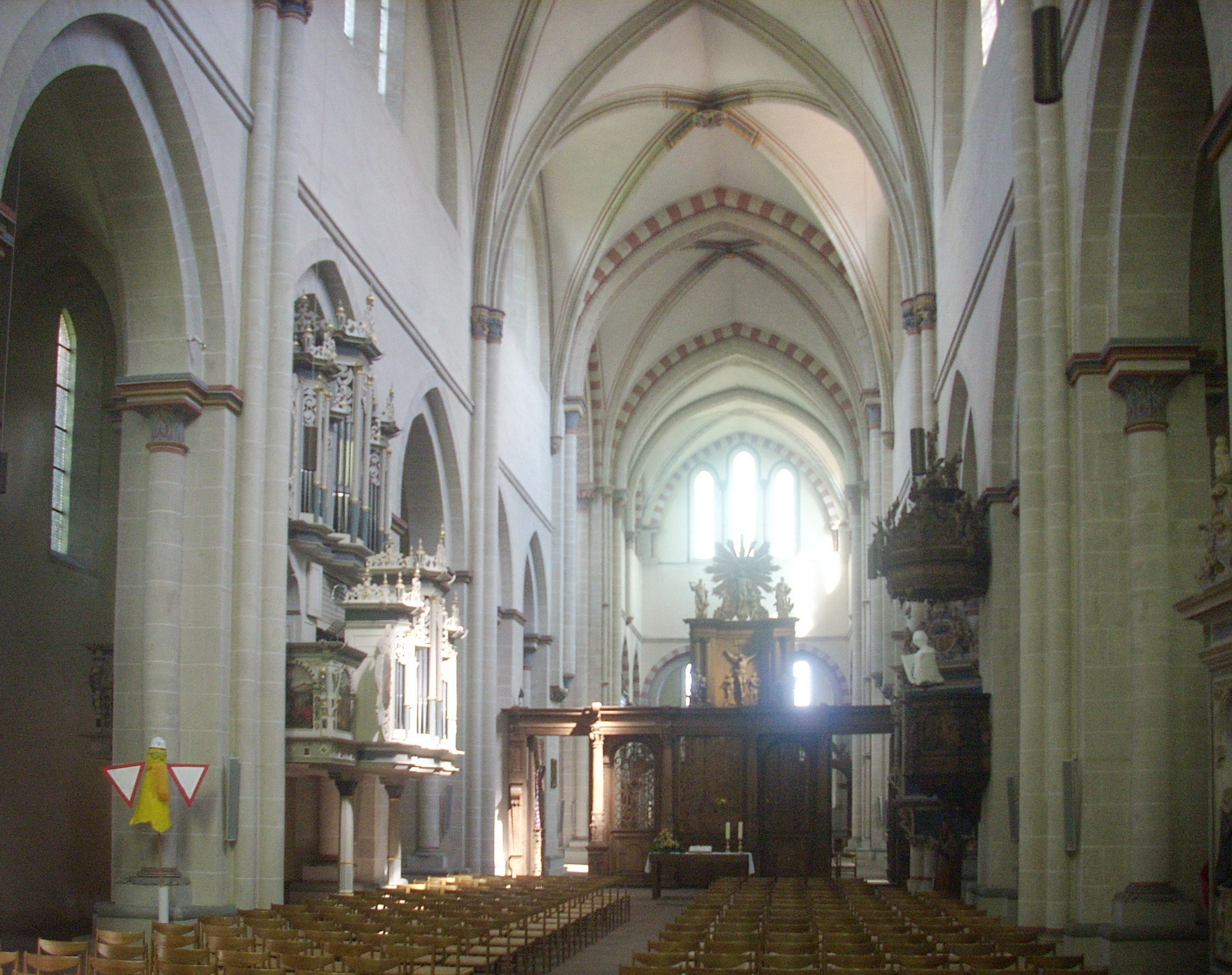
Church, interior

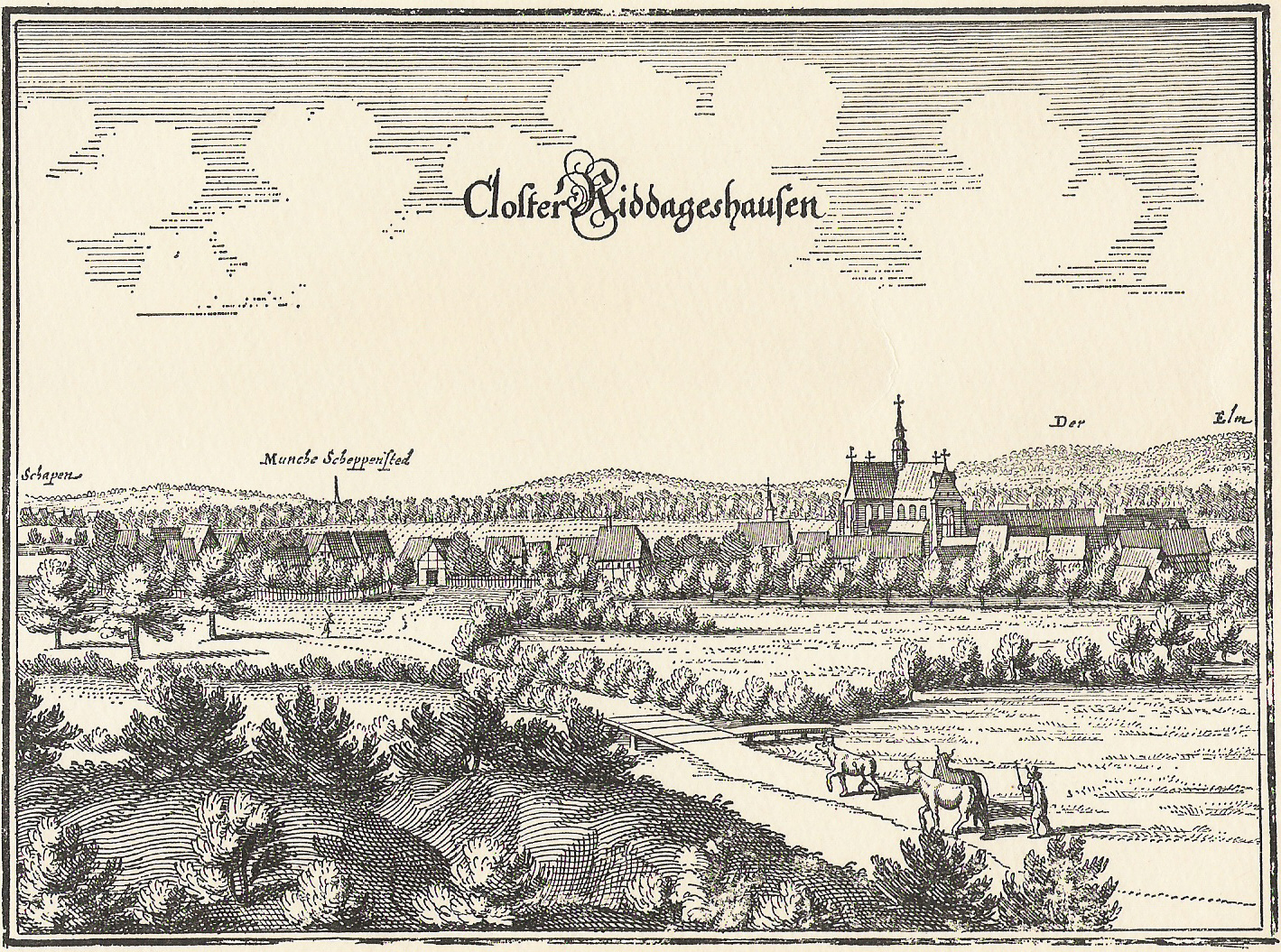
Riddagshausen Abbey in the 17th century
