= Broitzem =

- Borough of Braunschweig
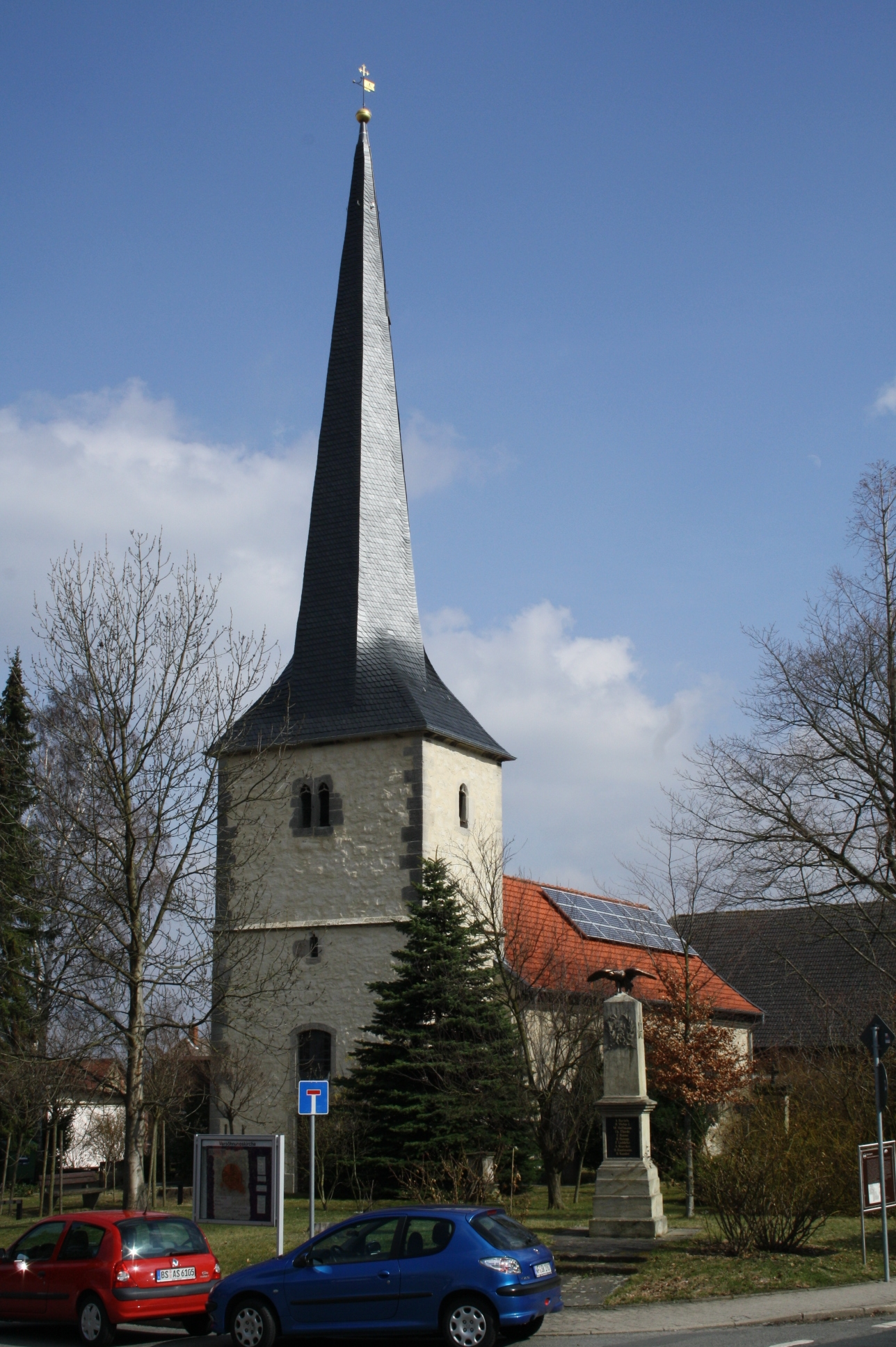
- Church in Broitzem

- Coat of arms

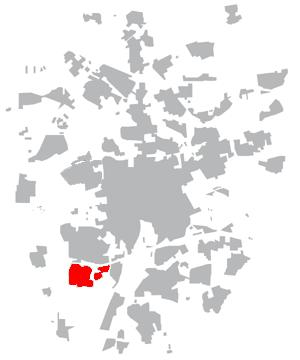
- Location of Broitzem within Braunschweig
- Interactive map of Broitzem
- Location within Germany Location within Lower Saxony
- Coordinates: 52°14′4″N 10°28′51″E
- Country: Germany
- State: Lower Saxony
- District: urban district
- City: Braunschweig

Government
  - Mayor: Meike Rupp-Naujok (SPD)

Area
  - Total: 3.700 km^{2} (1.429 sq mi)

Population (2020-12-31)
  - Total: 5,722
  - Density: 1,546/km^{2} (4,005/sq mi)
- Time zone: UTC+01:00 (CET)
  - Summer (DST): UTC+02:00 (CEST)
- Postal codes: 38122
- Dialling codes: 0531
- Vehicle registration: BS
- Website: Official Website

Broitzem is a Stadtbezirk (borough) in the south-western part of Braunschweig, Germany.

== History ==
The village of Broitzem was first mentioned in documents during the 12th century. Originally mostly a farming village, Broitzem became connected to the railway network via the Hildesheim–Brunswick railway during the 19th century and people increasingly started to commute to work in the city. By the early 20th century, the village had about 1000 inhabitants. During the 20th century, new residential and commercial areas were developed in Broitzem, causing a growth of population. In 1974, the village, until then part of the disbanded rural district of Braunschweig, was incorporated into the city of Braunschweig and became a city district.

=== Airfield ===
In 1916 a military airfield was established north of Broitzem. In 1929 the head office of the Deutsche Verkehrsfliegerschule was moved to Broitzem airfield, officially a flying school for commercial pilots and later a military training facility for the Luftwaffe. The airfield was closed after the end of World War II.

== Politics ==
The district mayor Meike Rupp-Naujok is a member of the Social Democratic Party of Germany.
