= Campen Castle =

Partially standing castle in Germany

- Burg Campen
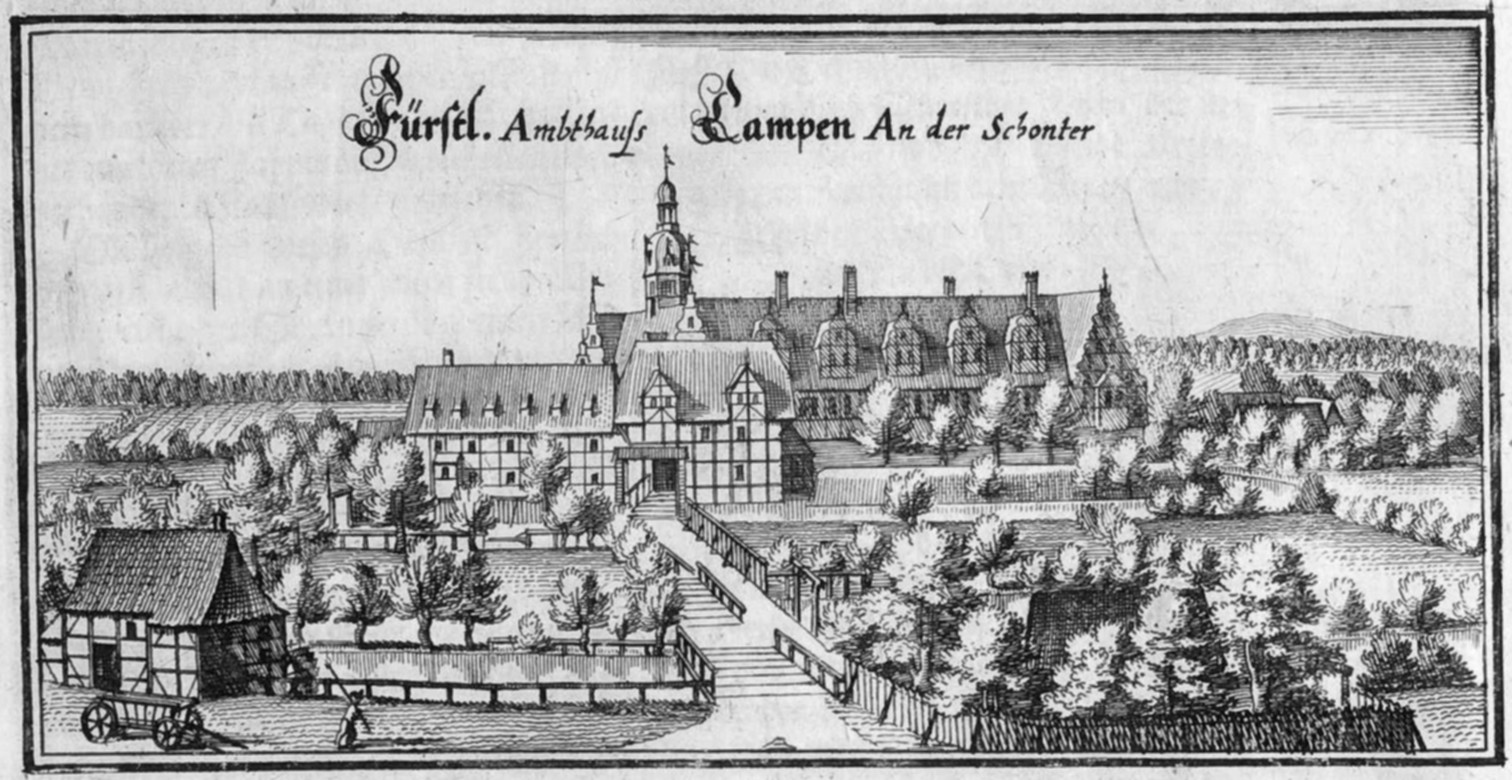
- Campen Castle, outer wall and building

- Location within Lower Saxony Location within Germany

General information
- Status: Partially standing
- Type: Castle
- Location: Flechtorf, Germany
- Coordinates: 52°21′08″N 10°42′32″E
- Construction started: Around 1279

Technical details
- Structural system: Truss

Campen Castle (German: Burg Campen) is a partially standing lowland castle built in the late 13th century in Flechtorf, a town within the municipality of Lehre, Lower Saxony.

== Description ==
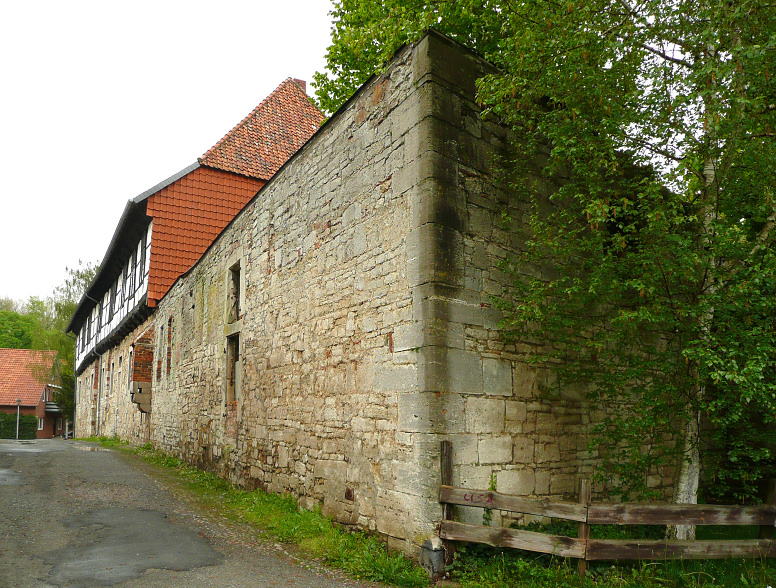
Outer wall

The castle is located on an slightly elevated plateau just south of the historic Flechtorf town center. It lies between the Schunter River and a small canal used to transport water for a mill and was also surrounded by a moat. The size of the plateau was about 80 meters (260 ft) by 100 meters (330 ft) from the northwest corner to the southwest corner. A description from 1754 indicates the main part of the castle was shaped like an irregular hexagon. The grounds also included a cavalier house, gatehouse, pleasure garden and prison. On the plateau, only a few remaining structures of the former castle have been preserved. Part of the royal house dating to the 16th century, built by Duke Wilhelm the Younger, which has a stone ground floor and an attached half-timbered structure, is still standing. Around 1800, much of the castle building was demolished.

== History ==
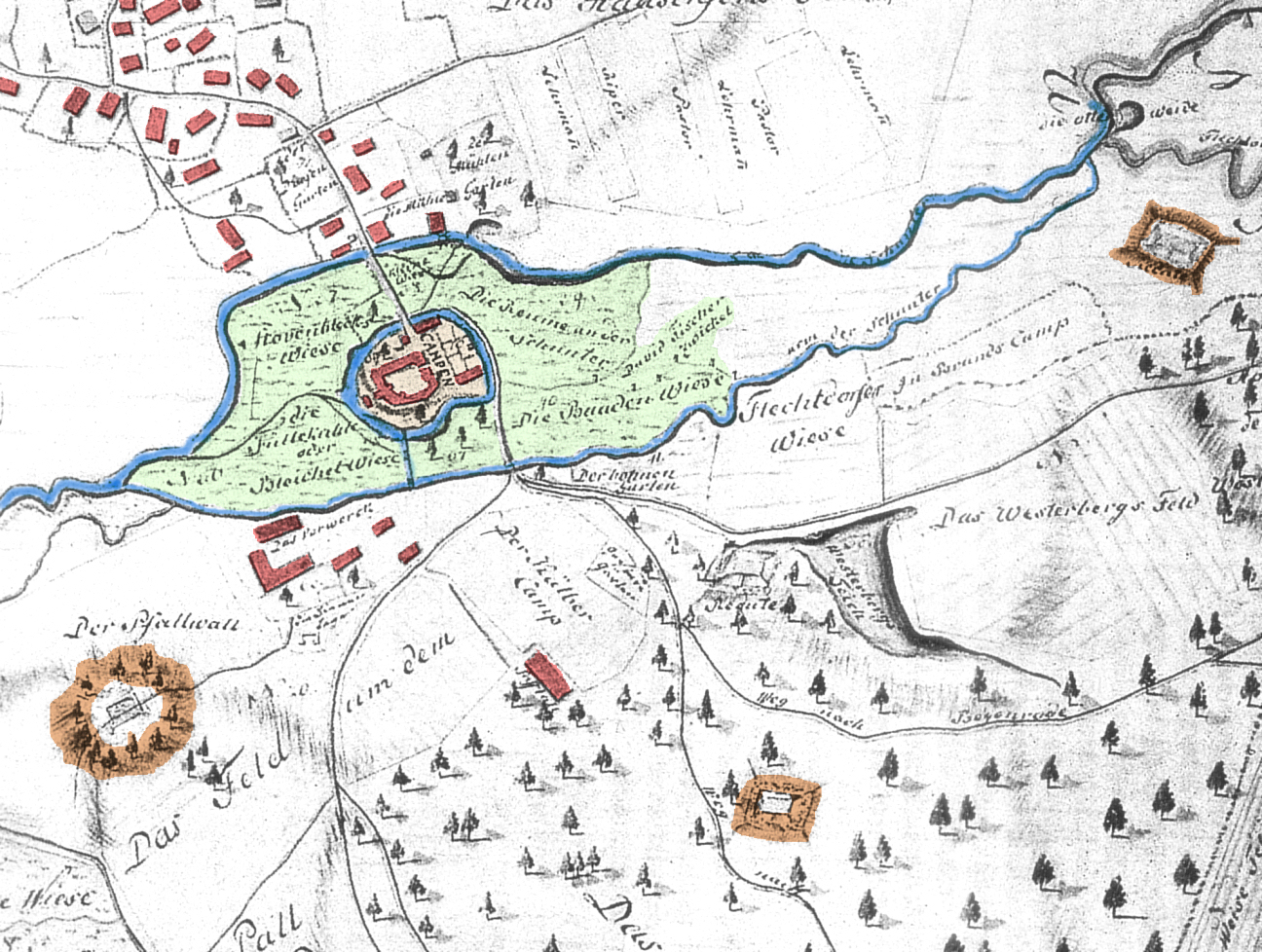
Map from 1740

The castle was built to protect the Braunschweig and Altmark trading route. The castle is believed to be constructed prior to its first documented mention in 1279. It was mentioned in the Hildesheim Episcopal Chronicle in connection with the conquest of the castle by Duke Henry the Admirable of Braunschweig-Grubenhagen and Duke Albert the Fat of Braunschweig-Gottingen. The two dukes fought against the Bishop of Hildesheim, Otto I, and captured 70 of his knights and vassals in the castle. The two dukes and their uncle had an ongoing territorial feud following the death of their father, Albert I, Duke of Brunswick-Lüneburg. This feud eventually led to the notable Battle of Dinklar in 1367.

For much of its history, the castle changed hands, either by conquest, pledges or being purchased.

In 1706, the castle belonged to the Principality of Braunschweig-Wolfenbuttel. It returned to private ownership in 1875 and in 1932, it was used as a school for the Hitler Youth, but was closed after one year due to lack of funds. In 1937, the castle was in possession of the National Socialist German Workers Party (Nazi Party). Following World War II, it has been under the ownership of the State of Lower Saxony.

== Literature ==
- Friedrich Andrews Perthes: “Geschichte von Braunschweig und Hannover.“ 1883
