= Scheppau =

River in Germany

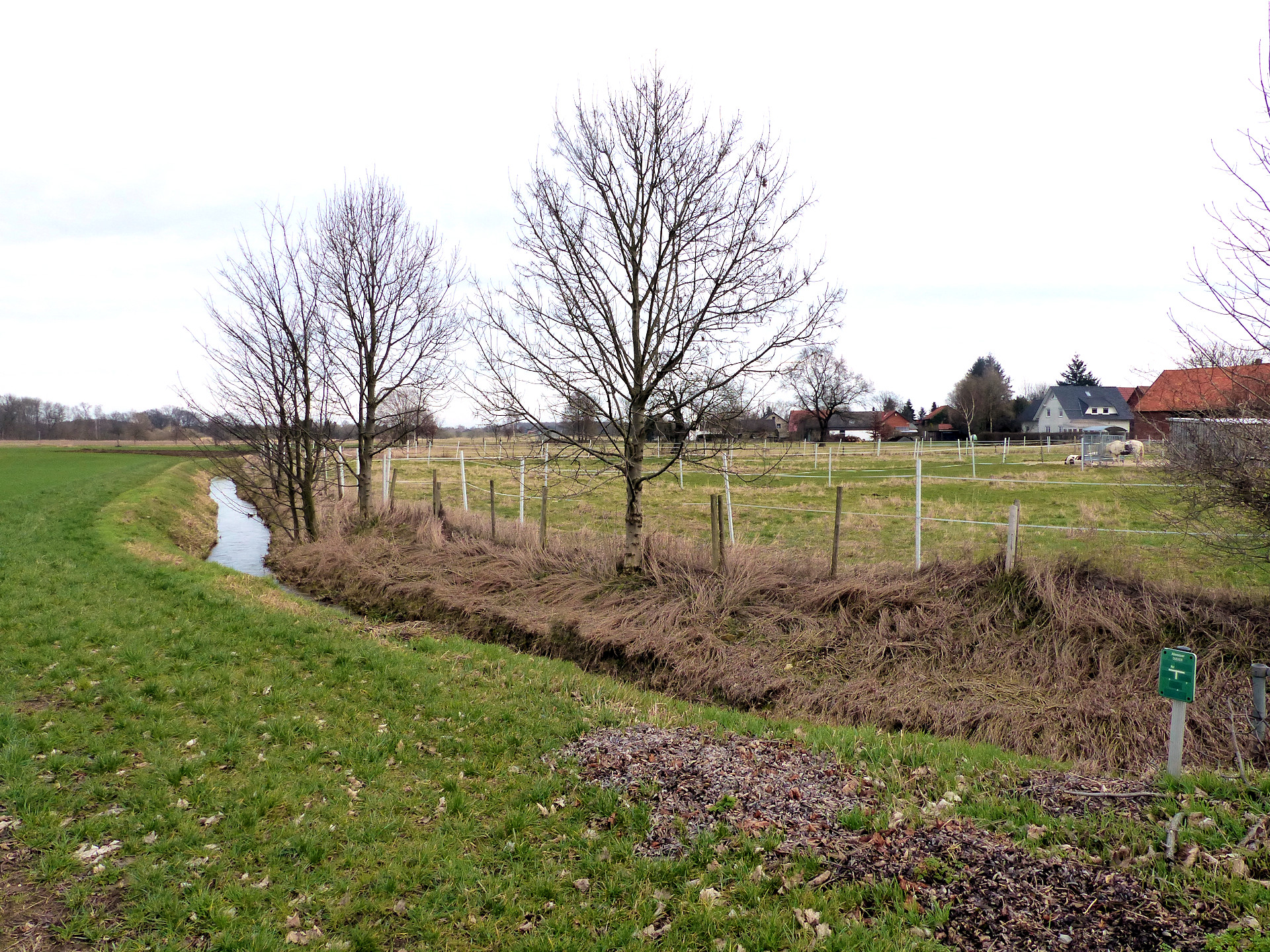
- The Scheppau near Scheppau, a district of Königslutter

Location
- Country: Germany
- State: Lower Saxony

Physical characteristics
- Mouth
  - location: Schunter
  - coordinates: 52.3224°N 10.8062°E
- Length: 9.5 km (5.9 mi)

Basin features
- Progression: Schunter→ Oker→ Aller→ Weser→ North Sea

Scheppau (German pronunciation: [ˈʃɛpaʊ]) is a river of Lower Saxony, Germany, approximately 10 km (6.2 mi) long. The Scheppau originates on the slope of the Elm hills and is a left tributary of the Schunter. It flows west and north of Königslutter and joins the Schunter in Glentorf, between Königslutter and Wolfsburg.

== See also ==
- List of rivers of Lower Saxony
