= Stöckheim-Leiferde =

- Borough of Braunschweig
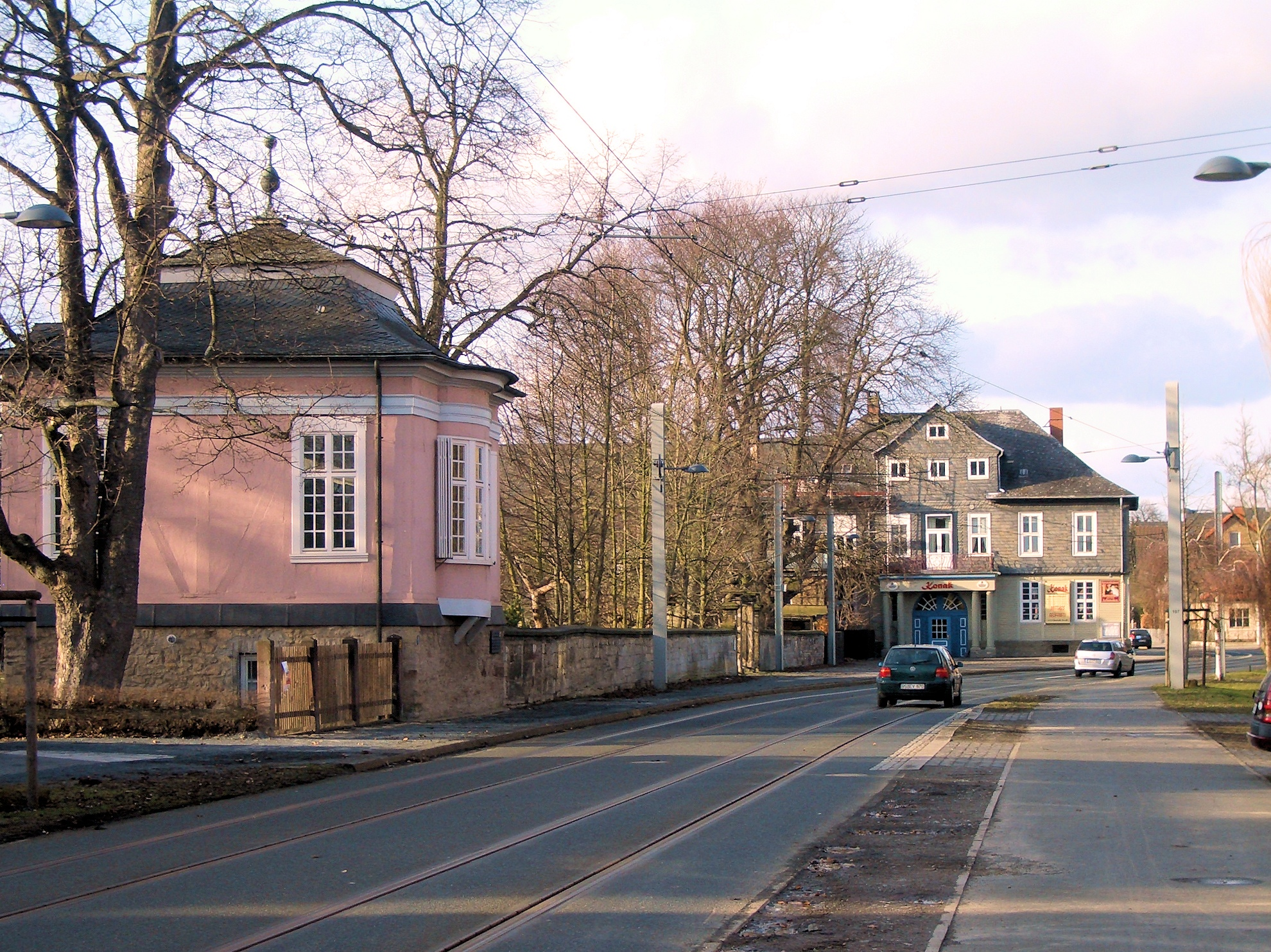
- Stöckheim

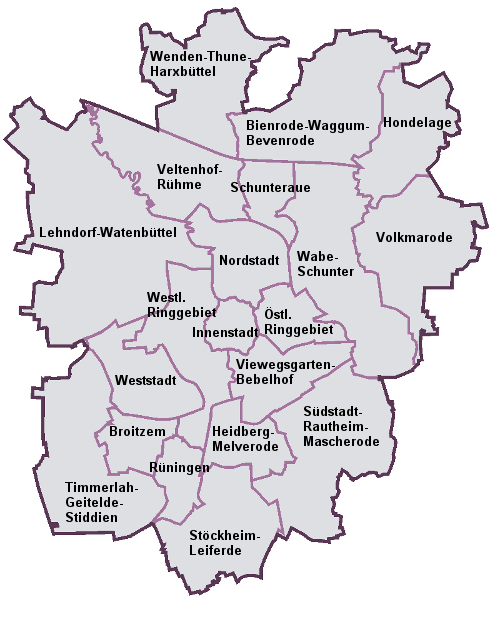
- Boroughs of Braunschweig
- Interactive map of Stöckheim-Leiferde
- Location within Germany Location within Lower Saxony
- Coordinates: 52°12′32″N 10°30′57″E
- Country: Germany
- State: Lower Saxony
- District: Braunschweig urban district
- City: Braunschweig

Government
  - Mayor: Matthias Disterheft (SPD)

Area
  - Total: 10.41 km^{2} (4.02 sq mi)

Population (2020-12-31)
  - Total: 8,460
  - Density: 813/km^{2} (2,100/sq mi)
- Time zone: UTC+01:00 (CET)
  - Summer (DST): UTC+02:00 (CEST)
- Postal codes: 38124
- Dialling codes: 0531, 05341 (parts of Leiferde)
- Vehicle registration: BS

Stöckheim-Leiferde is a borough (Stadtbezirk) in the southern part of Braunschweig (Brunswick), Germany. The population of 8,460 (2020) lives mostly in single-family homes.

The Stadtbezirk comprises the quarters Stöckheim, Leiferde and Friedrichshöhe.

== Landmarks ==
The cantor and teacher Ludwig Lüders invented the beet seeds drilling machine in Leiferde, which made it possible to put the beet seeds in the ground without the help of children. The reason for this invention was the high number of pupils who were not able to come to school because they had to help on the farm. Even today, there is a memorial stone in front of the church in Leiferde in memory of his invention.

The Großes Weghaus, located in Stöckheim, is a former toll house and inn built in 1691 on the road from Braunschweig to the town of Wolfenbüttel. Today a plaque commemorates the inn's famous guests Gotthold Ephraim Lessing and Wilhelm Raabe. Located next to the Weghaus is a Rococo pavilion, which today serves as a venue for cultural events.

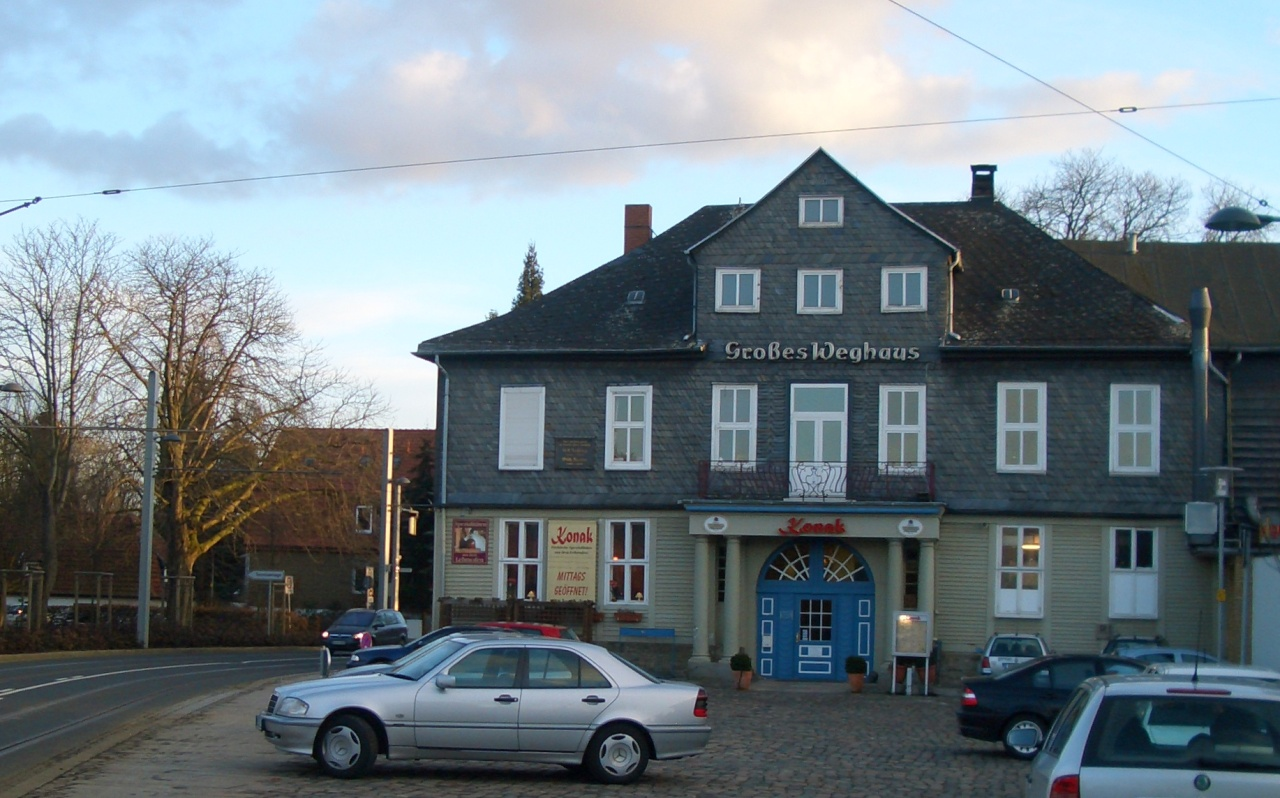
Großes Weghaus

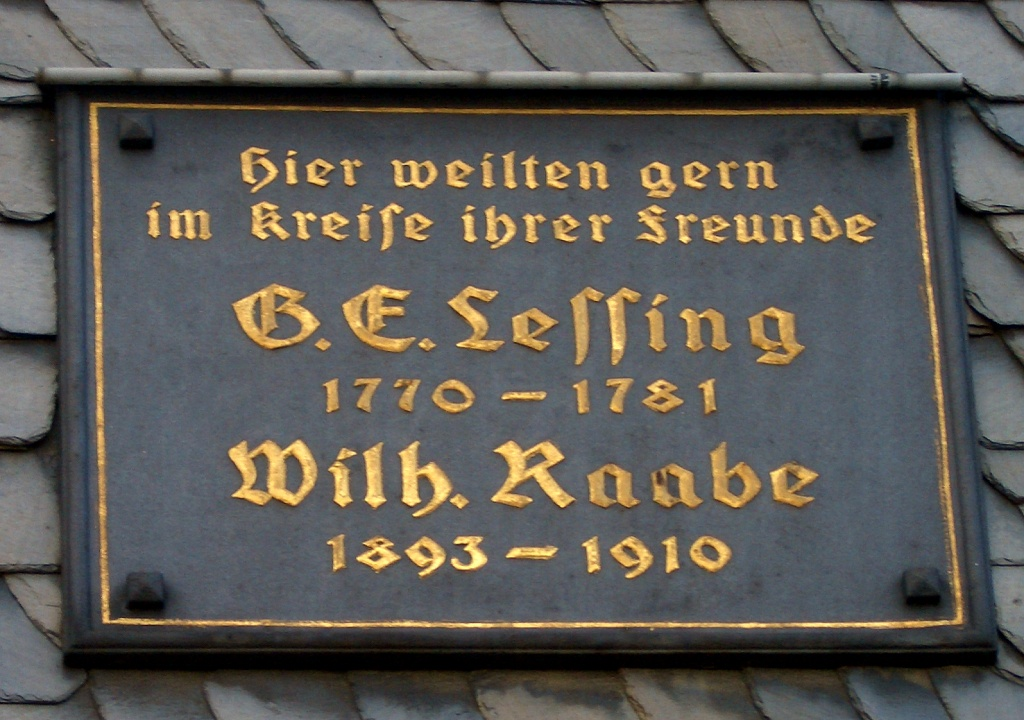
Commemorative plaque

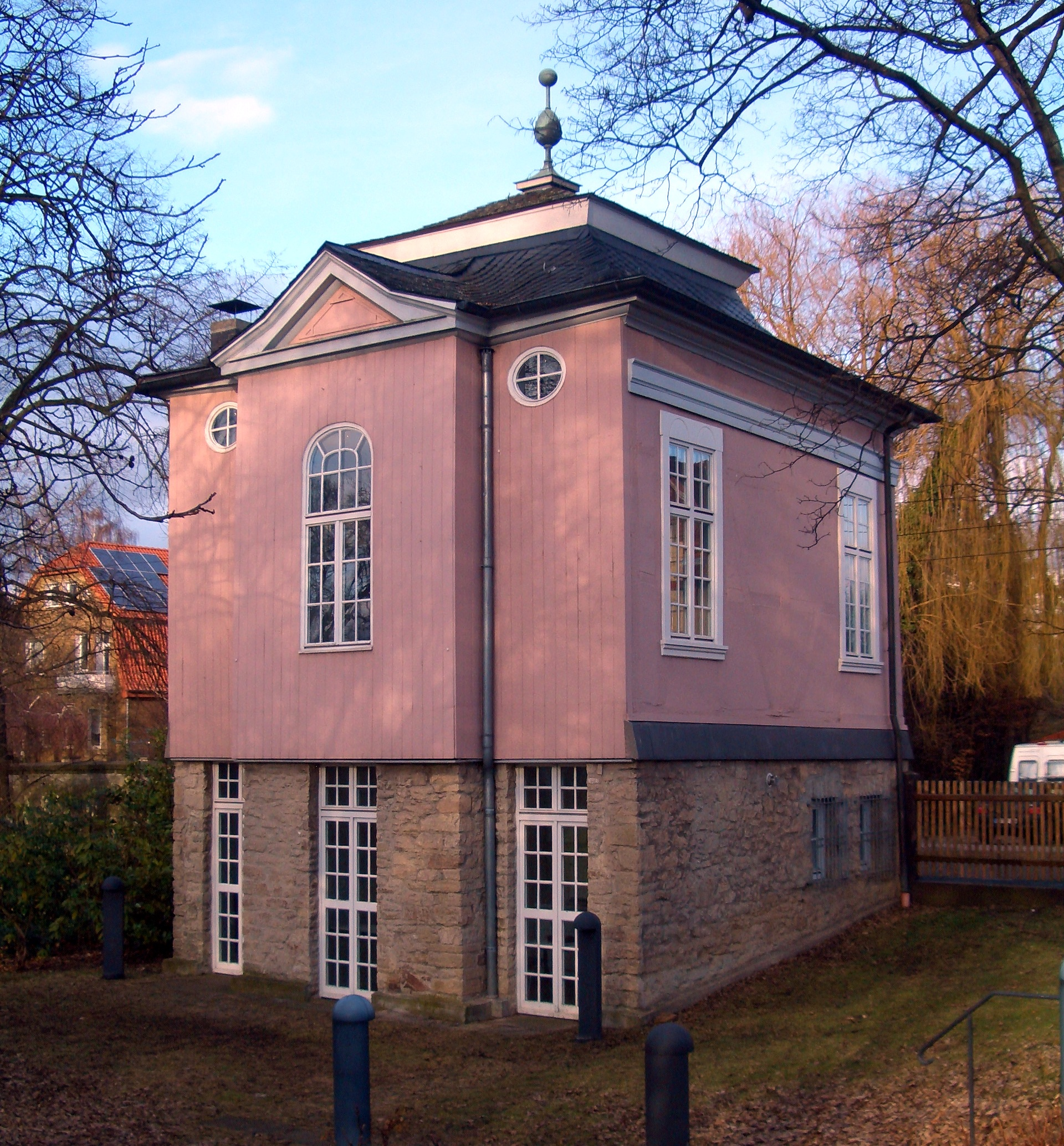
Rokoko-Pavillon

== Politics ==
The district mayor Matthias Disterheft is a member of the Social Democratic Party of Germany.

== Traffic in Stöckheim ==
On 15 October 2006, after about two years of construction, a new tram line went into operation in Stöckheim. Since then the line M1, which runs from the district of Wenden in the northern part of Braunschweig to the southern parts of the city, connects Stöckheim with the city centre and Braunschweig Central Station.

== Stöckheim Fire Department ==
As one of the oldest fire brigades (established in 1866) of the former state of Brunswick, the local fire brigade Stöckheim takes care of fire safety in the neighborhood. The local fire department currently has two vehicles that are used within and beyond Stöckheim.

Together with other fire brigades, Stöckheim makes up a Fachzug. The so-called "Youth Department" was established in 1966.

== Coats of arms ==
Coat of arms of Leiferde

Coat of arms of Stöckheim

== Sources ==
- Brunswick (in German)
- Fire brigade (in German)
