= The Permanent Cure =

The Permanent Cure
Founded	1975
Genre	Irish folk, bluegrass, country, Celtic rock
Current occupation
Vocal / violin / guitar	George Kaye
Vocal / mandolin / guitar	Lars Möller
Vocal / bass / harmonica	Thomas Gallagher
Vocal / guitar / percussion	Andreas Plate

The Permanent Cure is an Irish folk group. The songs commute between Irish folk, bluegrass, country and roots music.

== History ==
The Permanent Cure was formed in 1976 on St. Stephen's Green in Dublin, Ireland. The band's members were George Kaye, who was singer/songwriter, was playing on fiddle and on guitar, Dermot O'Connor, who was singer/songwriter, was playing on mandolin and on guitar, Leo Gillespie, who was singer/songwriter, was playing on guitar and blues harp and Pat Gibbs, who was singer, and was playing on clarinet, saxophone, piano and chromatic harmonica. They appeared on prime time in Irish Television (also in Gay Byrne's Late Late Show) and played in Dublin, Cork, and Galway.

With the unique music and the humor, between madness and typical black humor, they quickly got the reputation of the "world's only acoustic punk band". Then, they recorded their first album "The Permanent Cure works..!" created by the record label Chrysalis Records.

The band played with, among others, Dubliners and various other folk bands at Guinness concerts throughout the country. The band broke up with various solo projects in 1998.

The Permanent Cure was brought back to life in 2007. Leo Gillespie, Patrick Gibbs, and Dermot O'Connor left the band, but Thomas Gallagher, Lars Möller, and Andreas Plate became new members of the band. It is now performing mainly in Germany.

== Discography ==
- 1975: The Permanent Cure .. works! -- Label; Chrysalis
- 1993: Country Archives - Label: SWOM Records, Brunswick
- 1993: Bottled label SWOM Records, Brunswick
- 1995: Live - Label: SWOM Records, Brunswick
- 1997: Four To The Bar: Media Casset, Nümbrecht

== External link ==
- The Permanent Cure discography at Discogs
