= Lutter (Schunter) =

River of Lower Saxony, Germany

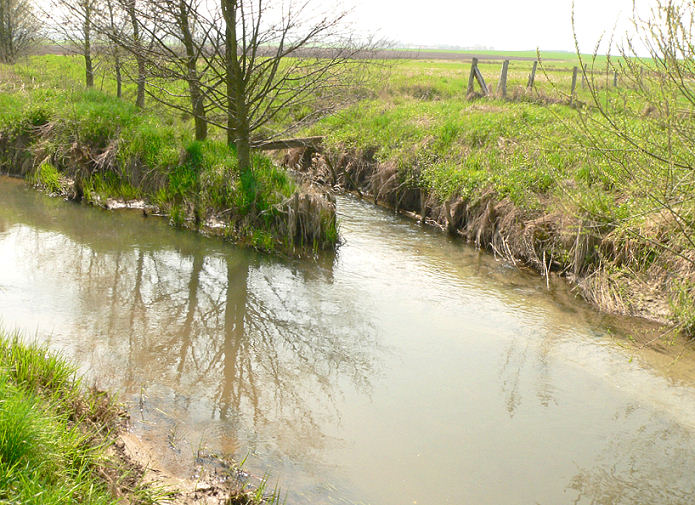
- Mouth into the Schunter

Location
- Country: Germany
- State: Lower Saxony

Physical characteristics
- Source
  - location: Lutterspring in Königslutter
  - elevation: 165 m (541 ft)
- Mouth
  - location: Schunter
  - coordinates: 52.2762°N 10.8464°E
- Length: 7.7 km (4.8 mi)

Basin features
- Progression: Schunter→ Oker→ Aller→ Weser→ North Sea

Lutter (German pronunciation: [ˈlʊtɐ]) is a river of Lower Saxony, Germany. It flows into the Schunter northeast of Königslutter.

== See also ==
- List of rivers of Lower Saxony
