= Wabe (Schunter) =

River in Germany

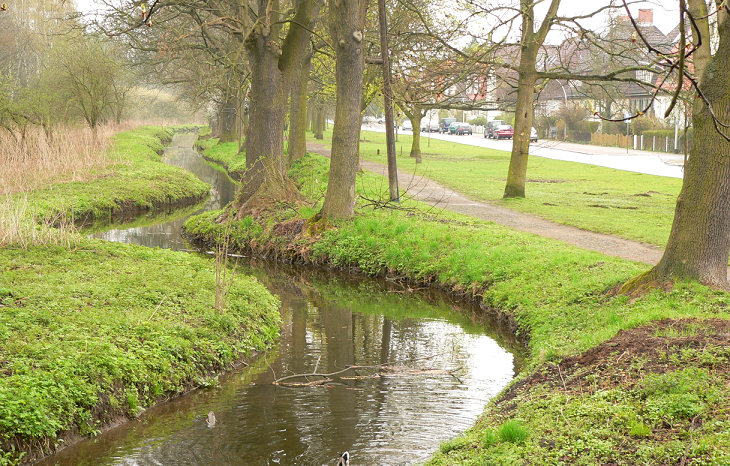
- The Wabe in Braunschweig

Location
- Country: Germany
- State: Lower Saxony

Physical characteristics
- Source
  - location: Elm
  - elevation: 240 m (790 ft)
- Mouth
  - location: Schunter
  - coordinates: 52.2957°N 10.5513°E
  - elevation: 70 m (230 ft)
- Length: 26.5 km (16.5 mi)

Basin features
- Progression: Schunter→ Oker→ Aller→ Weser→ North Sea
- Tributaries
  - right: Ohe

The Wabe (German pronunciation: [ˈvaːbə]) is a river of Lower Saxony, Germany. It flows into the Schunter northeast of Braunschweig.

== See also ==
- List of rivers of Lower Saxony
