= Schunter =

River in Lower Saxony, Germany

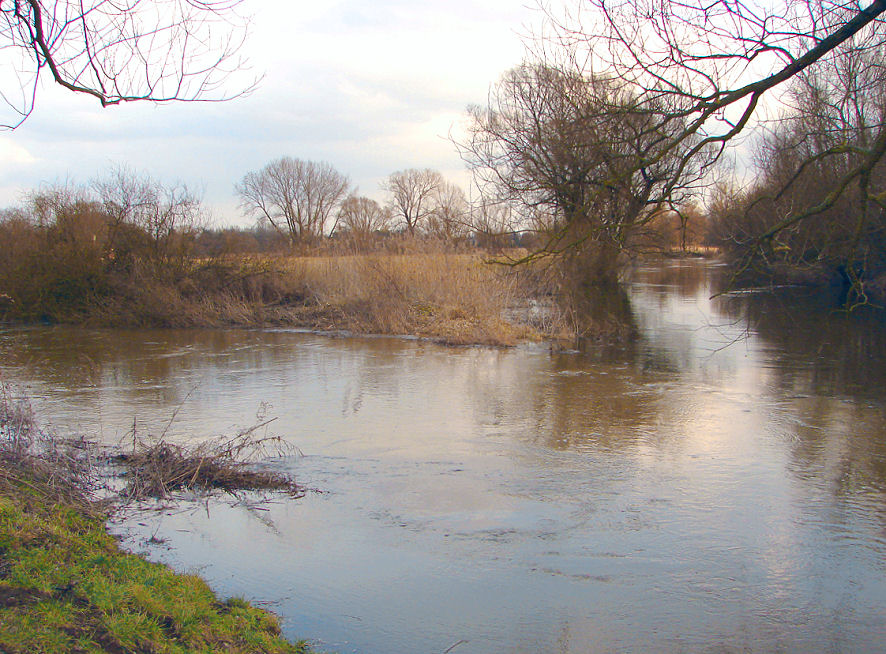
- Confluence of the Schunter (left) and Oker rivers near Groß Schwülper (the main village of Schwülper)

Location
- Country: Germany
- State: Lower Saxony

Physical characteristics
- Source
  - location: Elm
  - coordinates: 52°10′56″N 10°50′57″E
  - elevation: 175 m (574 ft)
- Mouth
  - location: Oker
  - coordinates: 52°20′37″N 10°26′22″E
- Length: 58.3 km (36.2 mi)
- Basin size: 597 km^{2} (231 sq mi)

Basin features
- Progression: Oker→ Aller→ Weser→ North Sea

The Schunter (German pronunciation: [ˈʃʊntɐ]) is a river in Lower Saxony, Germany. It has a length of 58 km (36 mi) and is a right tributary of the Oker.

== Etymology ==
The river was first mentioned as Schuntra in a 781 deed. The name may be of Slavic origin as sukątora means "with many turns" or “meandering.” The name underwent a number of changes throughout its recorded history. In 803, documents show it being called "Scuntra." In the late 10th century, it was called "Scuntera" and in the early 11th century it was mentioned as "Scuntre." Mid-17th century documents show a spelling of "Scunter" and then in 1755, it became known as "Schunter."

== History ==
In the middle of the 18th century, Duke Karl I ordered that the Schunter be made navigable up to the town of Frellstedt. This would make all but about 6 km (3.7 mi) of the river navigable. Much of the original meandering nature was replaced with straightaways with the help of dikes. Its clear spring waters formerly supplied the paper mills of Räbke. In the 18th century it was also used for timber rafting of logs harvested in the Elm range.

== Origin ==
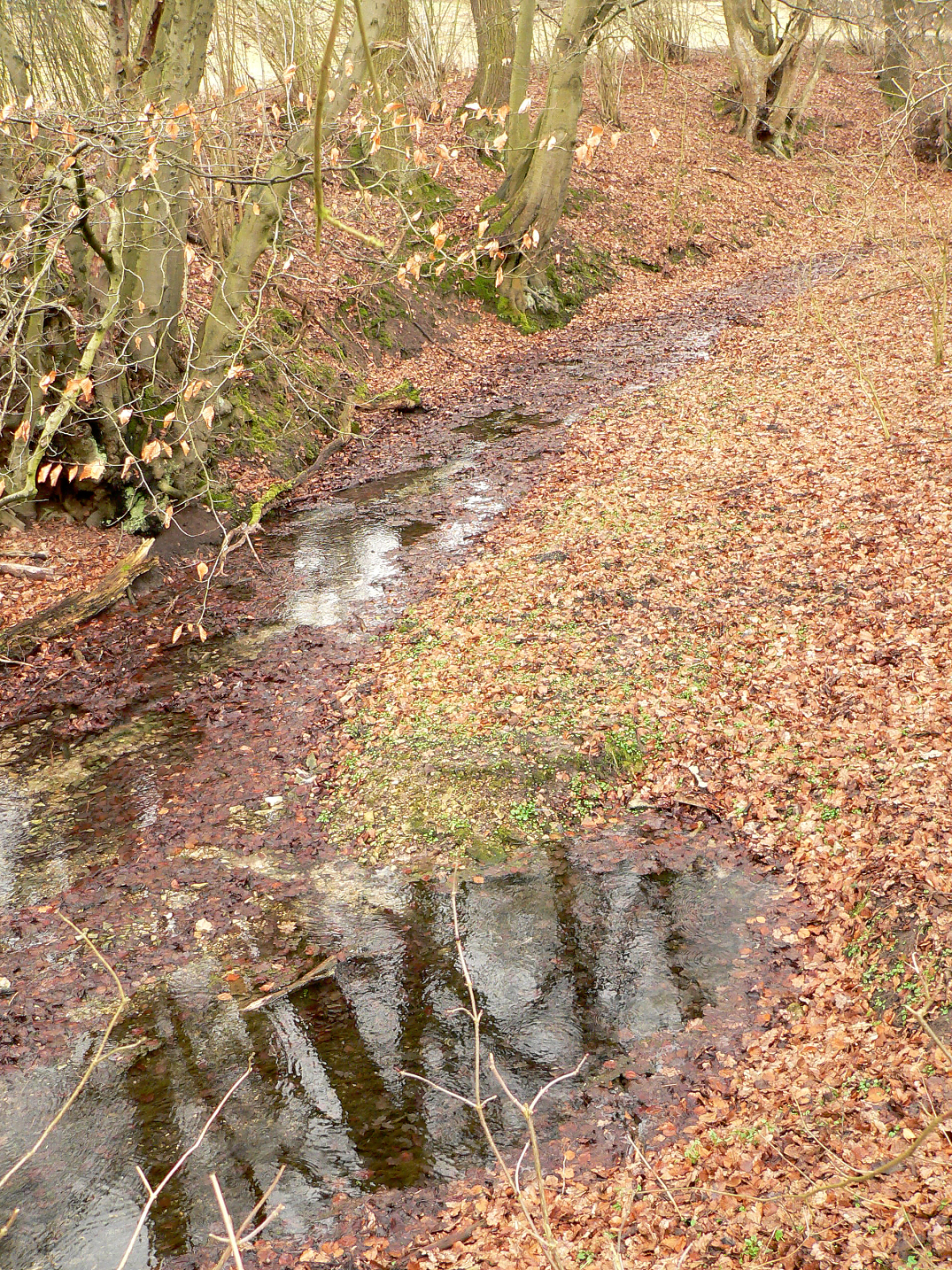
Springs in the Elm

The Schunter originates in the northeast Elm hills roughly 1 km (0.62 mi) west of the town of Räbke. Räbke is 15 km (9.3 mi) west of Helmstedt, the capital of the District of Helmstedt.

== Course ==
The river begins flowing east through Räbke and Frellstedt before turning north towards Süpplingen. After Süpplingen, it continues north passing just west of the historic Süpplingenburg municipality. The river then travels northwest past Groß Steinum, Beienrode and Ochsendorf. The river then turns north again and passes under Highway A2 and then on the eastern edge of Glentorf. The river then enters the urban Wolfsburg District. It again turns northwest before passing between Heiligendorf, Hattorf and Beienrode, where it reenters the District of Helmstedt. The river turns west, passing under Highway A39 before entering Flechtorf. Here it passes the partially standing 13th century Campen Castle that was built between the Schunter and a canal built parallel on the north side of the river. After leaving Flechtorf, the river bends sharply south, then passes under the Weddel loop railroad tracks before passing on the north and west side of the town of Lehre. The river continues southwest before entering Wendhausen where it passes Wendhausen Castle, a 17th-century moated castle. Then the river passes again under Highway 2 at Hondelage, before passing Dibbesdorf, Querumer Forst and entering the north side of the Braunschweig urban area. Winding its way through Braunschweig before turning north and passing under Highway 2 the third time, followed by passing under Highway A391 before crossing under the Mittelland Canal. In its final stretch the Schunter passes Thune, heads west past Harxbüttel and just north of Walle before flowing into the Oker River at Schwülper, downstream of Braunschweig.

== Tributaries ==
Left tributaries (from source to mouth):

- Schierpkebach
- Lutter
- Lauinger Mühlenriede
- Scheppau
- Teichgraben
- Sandbach
- Wabe

Right tributaries:

- Laagschunter
- Lange Welle
- Uhrau
- Neindorferbach
- Heiligendorferbach
- Beberbach

== Other ==
The Schunter River is represented on the Ochsendorf coat of arms.

== See also ==
- List of rivers of Lower Saxony

== Sources ==
- Theodor Müller: Schifffahrt und Flößerei auf der Schunter im 18. Jahrhundert. In: Forschungen zur Braunschweigischen Geschichte, 1954, 135-159
- Gunhild Ruben: Herzog Karl I. und der Schifffahrtskanal vom Elm nach Braunschweig. Braunschweig 2002
- Uwe Kleineberg: Chronik 975 Jahre Wenden. Braunschweig 2006, p. 135ff
