= Beberbach (Schunter) =

River in Germany

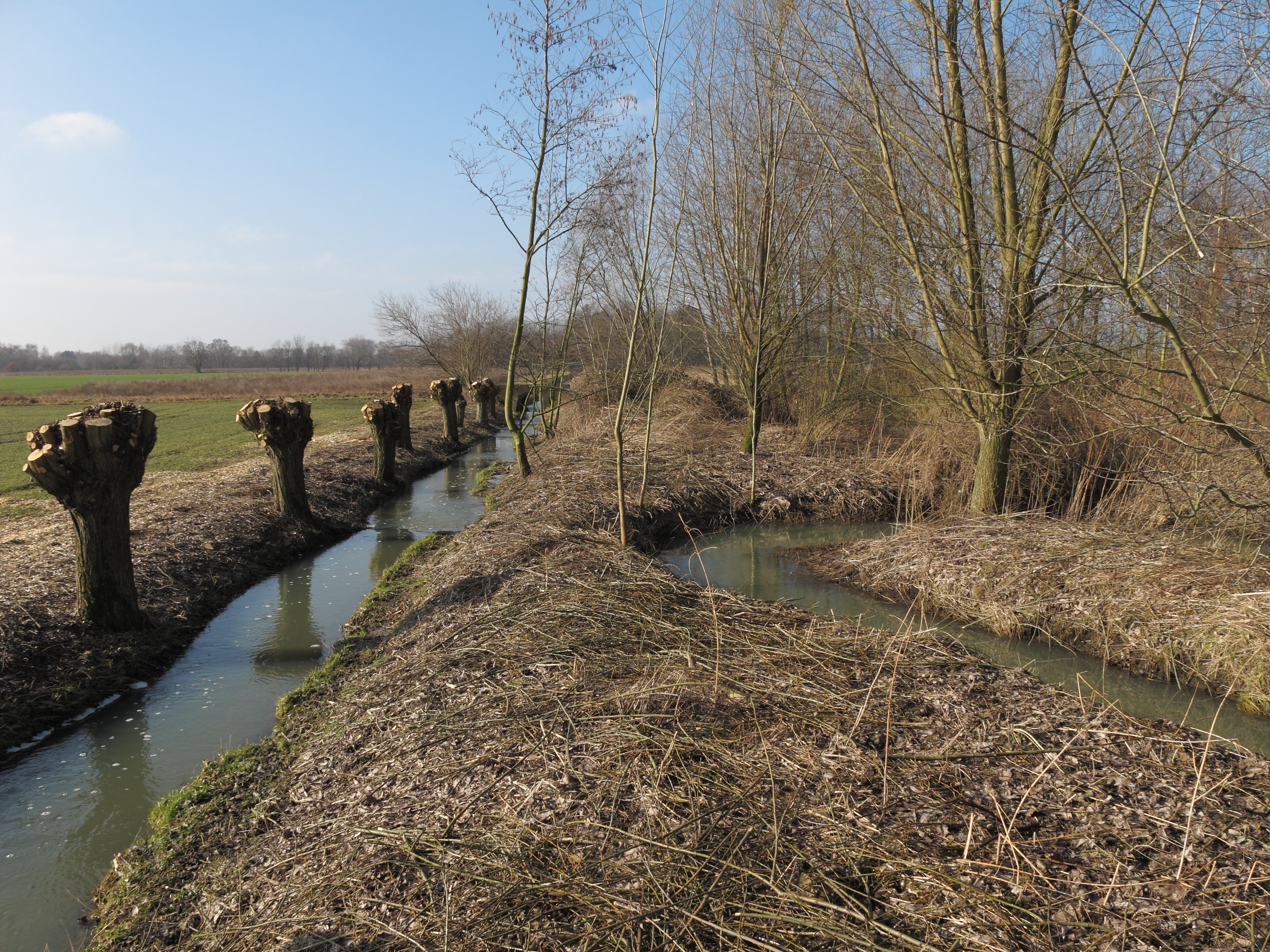
- The Beberbach between Waggum and Bechtsbüttel, looking west.

Location
- Country: Germany
- State: Lower Saxony

Physical characteristics
- Source
  - elevation: 93 m (305 ft)
- Mouth
  - location: Schunter
  - coordinates: 52.3268°N 10.5183°E
  - elevation: 67 m (220 ft)
- Length: 6 km (3.7 mi)

Basin features
- Progression: Schunter→ Oker→ Aller→ Weser→ North Sea

The Beberbach is a small river of Lower Saxony, Germany. It flows into the Schunter north of Braunschweig.

== See also ==
- List of rivers of Lower Saxony
