= Süpplingen =

- Municipality
- Coat of arms

- Location of Süpplingen within Helmstedt district
- Interactive map of Süpplingen
- Location within Germany Location within Lower Saxony
- Coordinates: 52°13′57″N 10°54′53″E
- Country: Germany
- State: Lower Saxony
- District: Helmstedt
- Municipal assoc.: Nord-Elm

Government
  - Mayor: Harald Schulze

Area
  - Total: 10.35 km^{2} (4.00 sq mi)
- Elevation: 108 m (354 ft)

Population (2025-12-31)
  - Total: 1,667
  - Density: 161.1/km^{2} (417.2/sq mi)
- Time zone: UTC+01:00 (CET)
  - Summer (DST): UTC+02:00 (CEST)
- Postal codes: 38373
- Dialling codes: 05355
- Vehicle registration: HE
- Website: www.suepplingen.de

Süpplingen is a municipality in the district of Helmstedt, in Lower Saxony, Germany. The village is located on the Schunter in Helmstedt district, Lower Saxony, about 6 km to the west of Helmstedt, by the Bundesstraße 1. It is one of the municipalities constituting the Nord-Elm municipal association. The former mining settlement of Nordschacht forms part of the municipality.

Süpplingenburg, a separate village and municipality which emerged from a medieval castle complex, is located nearby.

== History ==
Süpplingen was first mentioned in the year 888 AD as sophingi in an exchange certificate.

About 1770, the first open-pit coal mine opened in the area. During the second half of the 19th Century, the sugar industry emerged as an additional economic sector. Nonetheless, lignite mining continued to be important for the local economy.

From 1885 to 1888 AD, the 54-meter-deep northern shaft of the Süpplinger Germarkung (district) was sunk. It belonged to the Prinz Wilhelm shaft in Wolsdorf, which had existed since 1821 AD. From 1890 AD, a cable car connected the northern shaft with the NorddeutscheZuckerraffinerie Frellstedt (Northern German Sugar Refinary Frellstedt), the main buyer of the coal extracted there. After the drainage failed in 1921 following machinery damage, the northern shaft was abandoned.

== Religion ==
The Lutheran church St. Lambertus is located in the center of the village. It belongs to the Deanary of Königslutter.

The Catholic church St. Bonifatius was constructed in 1899 AD. Since 2008 it belongs to the parish of St. Ludgeri (Helmstedt).

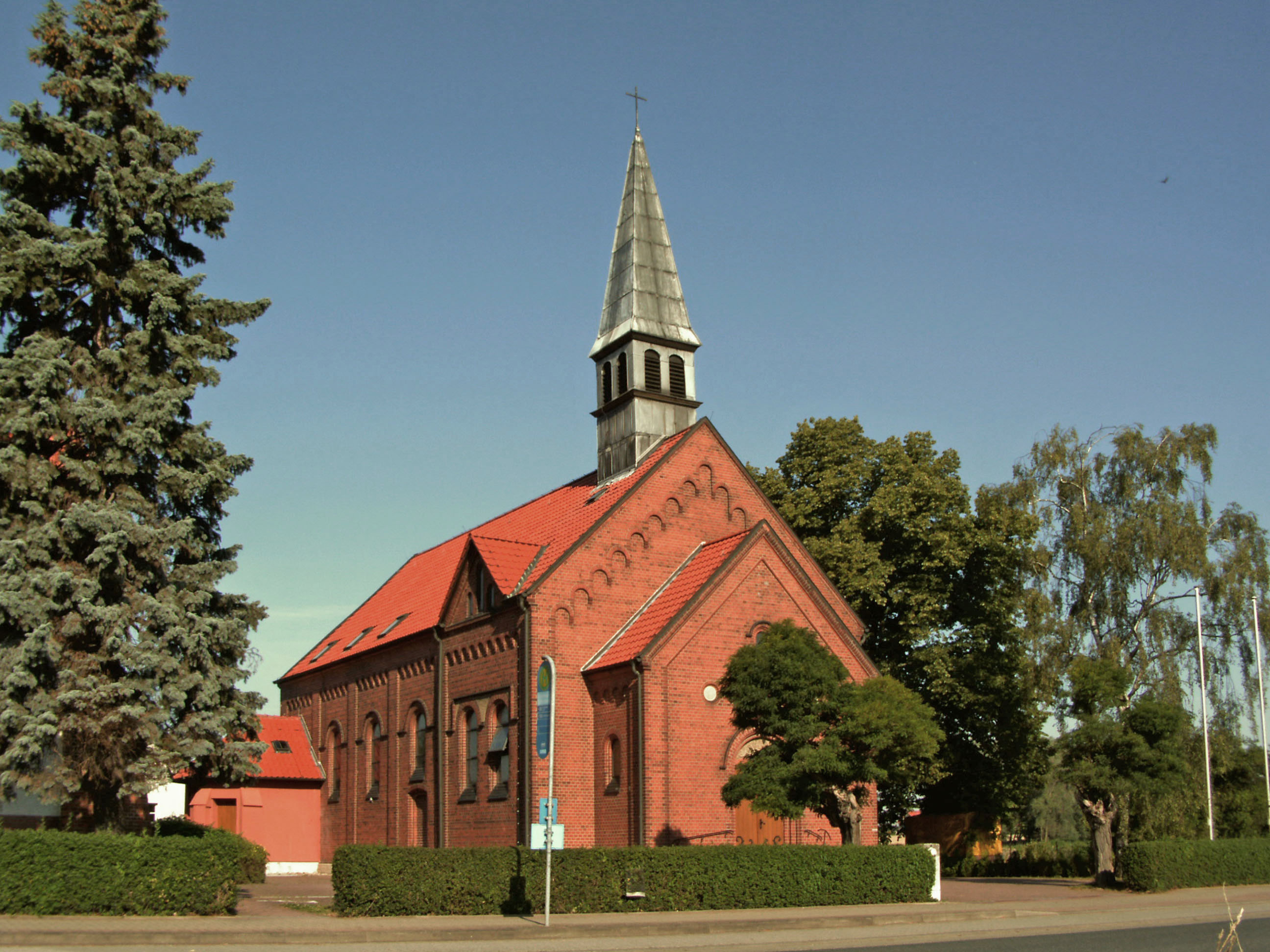
St. Boniface (Catholic)

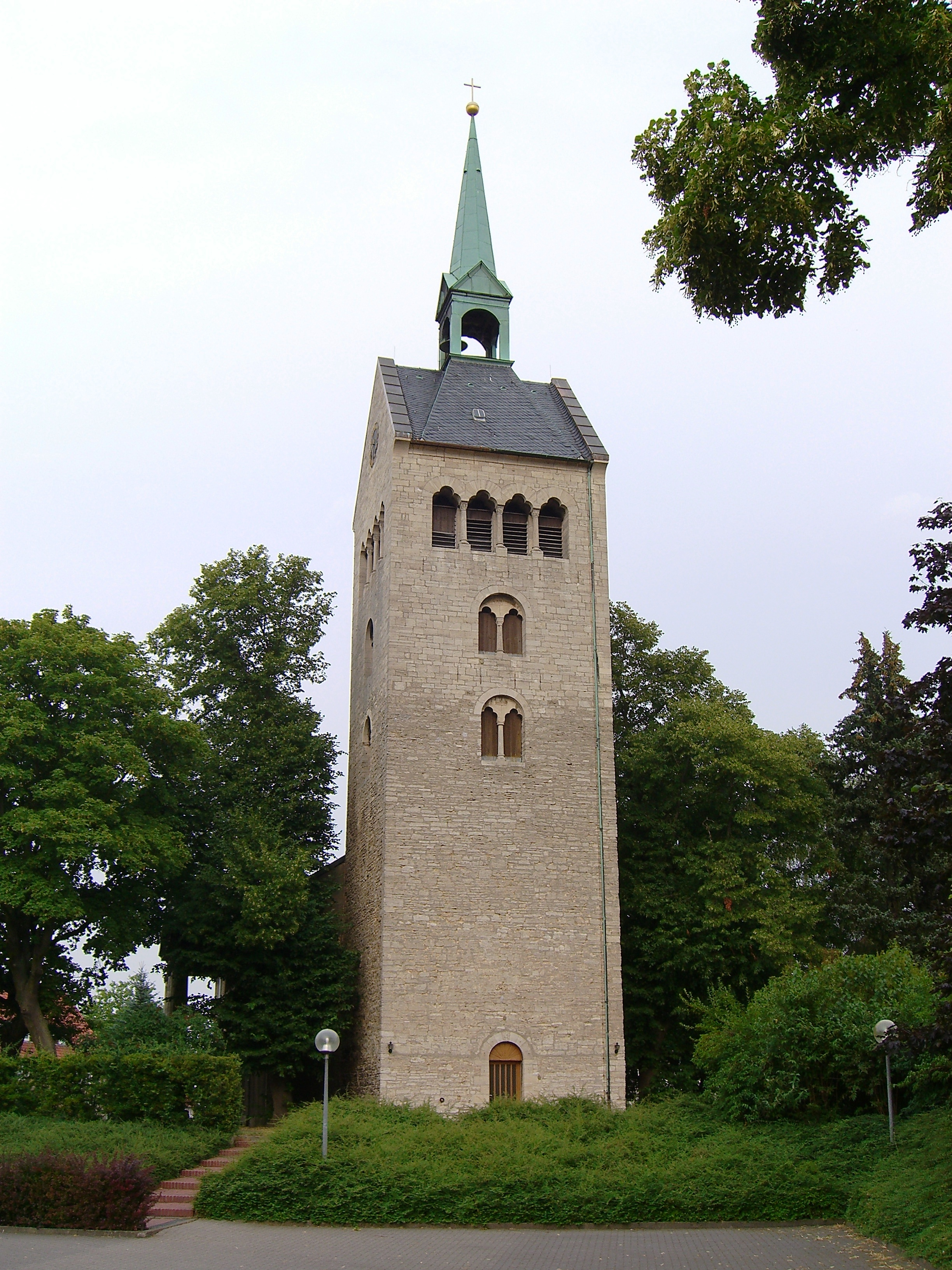
St. Lambertus (Lutheran)

== Twin towns ==
The twin towns of Süpplingen are:

- Noyant-la-Gravoyère in France;
- Süplingen in Saxony-Anhalt; and
- Dudar in Hungary.
