= Twieflingen =

- Ortsteil of Söllingen
- Interactive map of Twieflingen
- Location within Germany Location within Lower Saxony
- Coordinates: 52°07′N 10°56′E
- Country: Germany
- State: Lower Saxony
- District: Helmstedt
- Municipality: Söllingen

Area
  - Total: 18.78 km^{2} (7.25 sq mi)
- Elevation: 105 m (344 ft)

Population (2015-12-31)
  - Total: 702
  - Density: 37.4/km^{2} (96.8/sq mi)
- Time zone: UTC+01:00 (CET)
  - Summer (DST): UTC+02:00 (CEST)
- Postal codes: 38388
- Dialling codes: 05352
- Vehicle registration: HE
- Website: www.samtgemeinde-heeseberg.de

Twieflingen is a village and a former municipality in the district of Helmstedt, in Lower Saxony, Germany. Since 1 November 2016, it has been part of the municipality of Söllingen.
