= Offleben =

- Ortschaft of Helmstedt
- Interactive map of Offleben
- Location within Germany Location within Lower Saxony
- Coordinates: 52°8′N 11°2′E
- Country: Germany
- State: Lower Saxony
- District: Helmstedt
- Town: Helmstedt
- Time zone: UTC+01:00 (CET)
  - Summer (DST): UTC+02:00 (CEST)
- Postal codes: 38372
- Dialling codes: 05352
- Vehicle registration: HE

Offleben is a former municipality in the district of Helmstedt, in Lower Saxony, Germany. It was Incorporated into the newly formed Büddenstedt on 1 March 1974. Since 1 July 2017 Offleben is part of Helmstedt. Offleben is an Ortschaft (municipal division) of the town Helmstedt, and includes the villages Offleben, Reinsdorf and Hohnsleben.

== History ==
It is estimated that Offleben was established between 822 and 875 as „Uffenleva“. First records are from 1151.

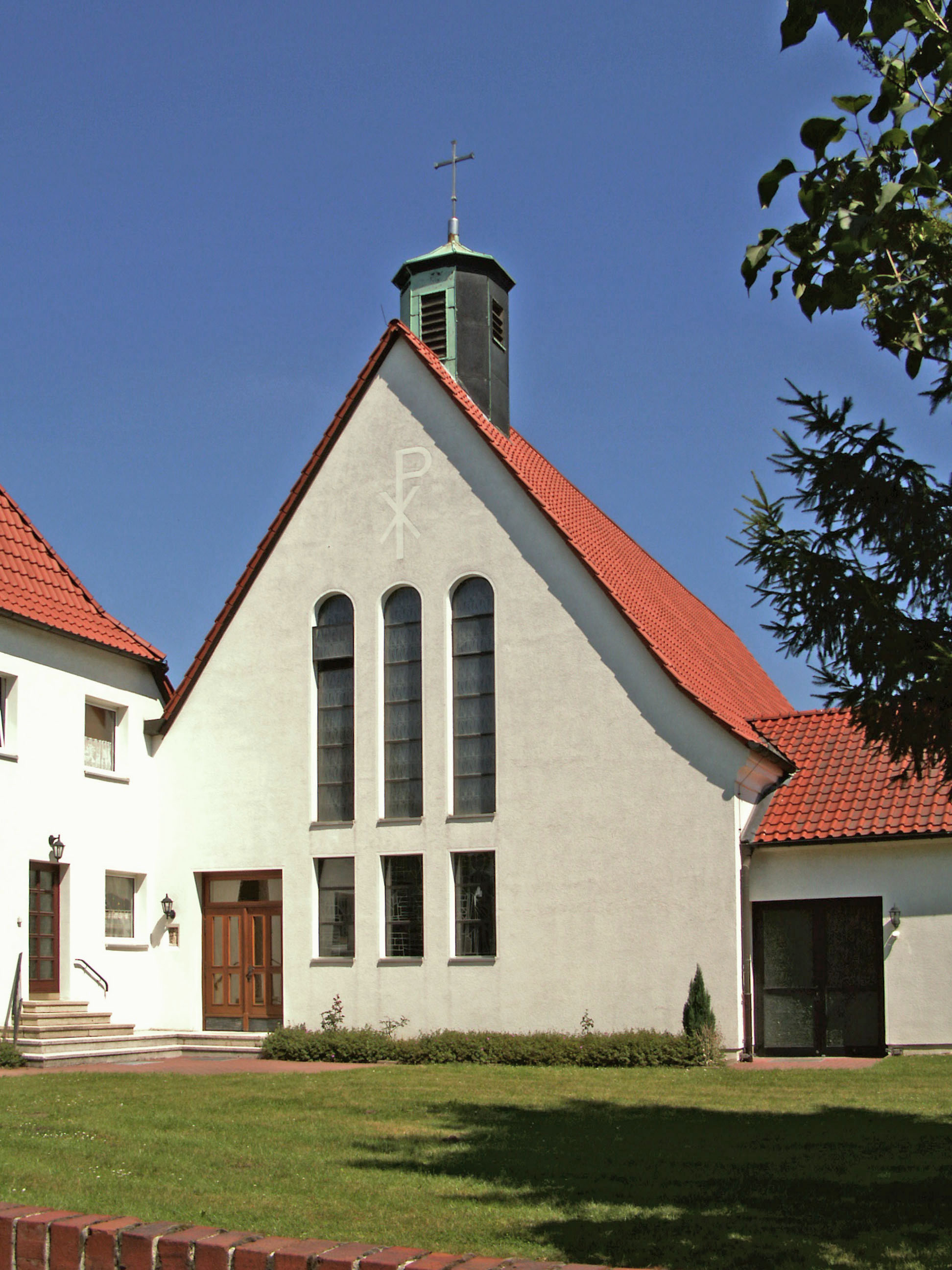
The former catholic church
