= Süpplingenburg =

- Municipality
- Coat of arms

- Location of Süpplingenburg within Helmstedt district
- Interactive map of Süpplingenburg
- Location within Germany Location within Lower Saxony
- Coordinates: 52°15′N 10°55′E
- Country: Germany
- State: Lower Saxony
- District: Helmstedt
- Municipal assoc.: Nord-Elm

Government
  - Mayor: Dieter Eckner

Area
  - Total: 14.30 km^{2} (5.52 sq mi)
- Elevation: 114 m (374 ft)

Population (2025-12-31)
  - Total: 649
  - Density: 45.4/km^{2} (118/sq mi)
- Time zone: UTC+01:00 (CET)
  - Summer (DST): UTC+02:00 (CEST)
- Postal codes: 38376
- Dialling codes: 05355
- Vehicle registration: HE
- Website: www.samtgemeinde-nord-elm.de

Süpplingenburg is a municipality in the district of Helmstedt, Lower Saxony, Germany. It is part of the collective municipality (Samtgemeinde) of Nord-Elm.

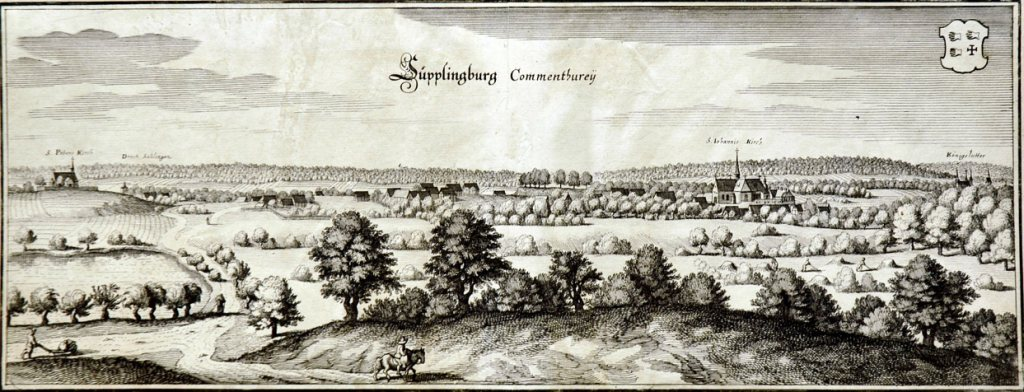
Süpplingburg Commenthurey, engraving by Matthäus Merian, about 1650

The village developed next to a 10th-century water castle at the Schunter river, probably erected by the Counts of Haldensleben who then held the office of margraves of the Northern March. Gertrud von Haldensleben's daughter, Hedwig of Formbach, married Count Gebhard of Supplinburg. Until 1173 the castle was the seat of the Counts of Supplinburg, among them Gebhard's son Emperor Lothair III of Supplinburg.

Lothair had a collegiate church and cloister built within the Supplinburg palace about 1130. In 1173 his grandson Henry the Lion granted Süpplingenburg to the Knights Templar order, from which it fell to the Knights Hospitaller in 1357. It remained a commandry (Komturei) of the Order of Saint John until in 1820 it was finally mediatised to the Duchy of Brunswick. The castle was demolished about 1875, while the St John Church survived, today a stop at the scenic Romanesque Road.

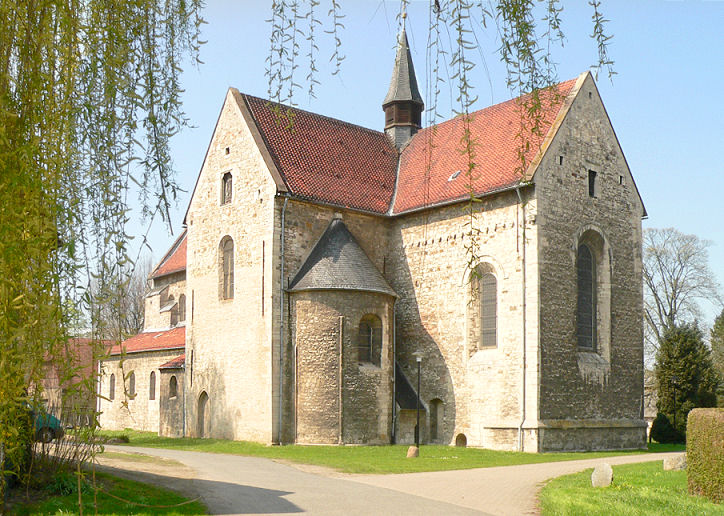
St. John Church

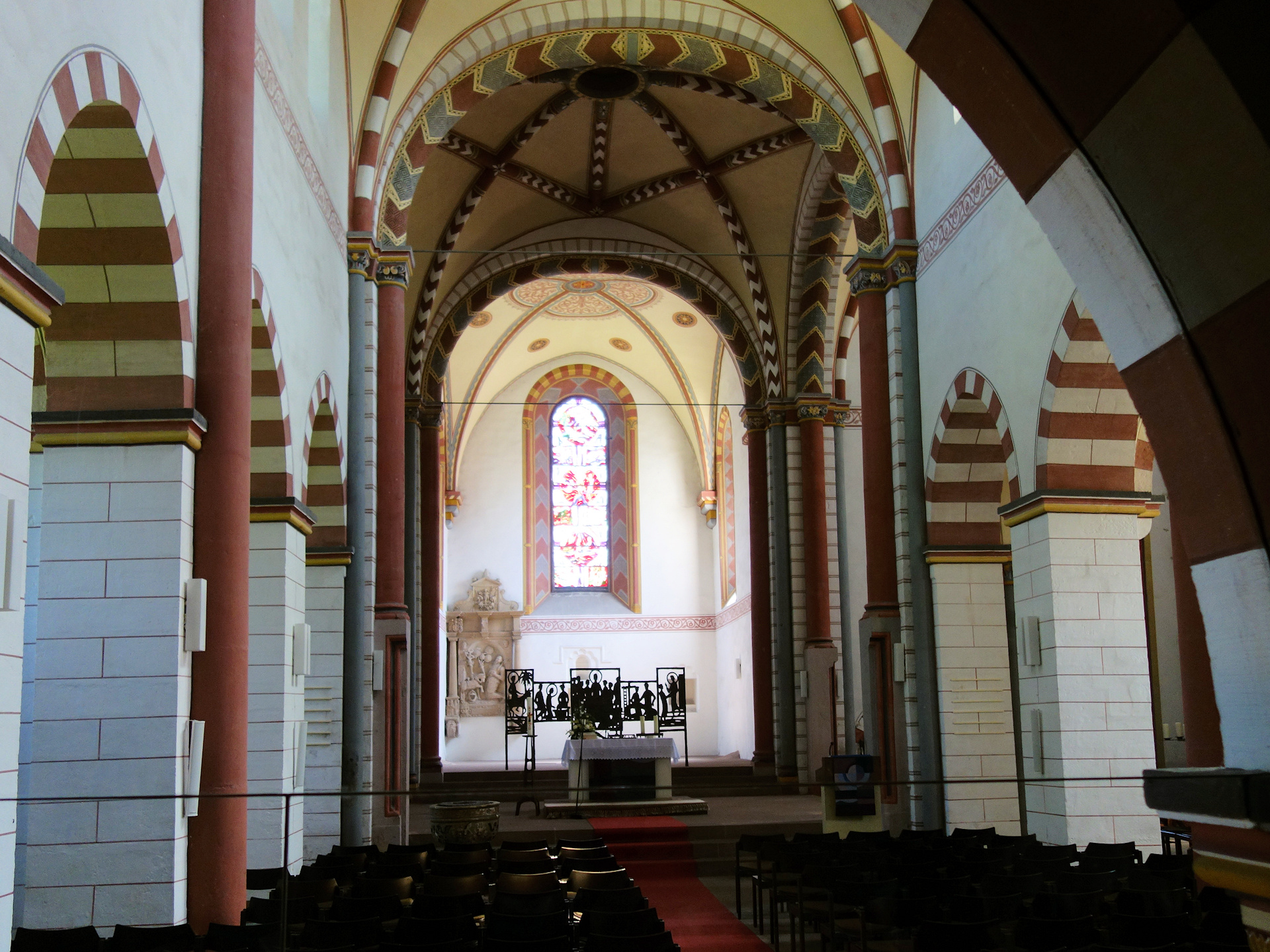
St. John Church

== Transportation ==
Süpplingenburg can be reached via the Bundesstraße 1 federal highway at Süpplingen or the Bundesautobahn 2 at the Rennau junction. Train service of the Brunswick-Magdeburg railway line is available at Helmstedt.
