= List of territorial changes to the District of Helmstedt =

This is a list of territorial changes to the district of Helmstedt, Lower Saxony, Germany during the administrative reforms of the 1970s.

- Municipalities lost:
  - to Gifhorn
    - Ahnebeck
    - Bergfeld
    - Brechtorf
    - Eischott
    - Hoitlingen
    - Parsau
    - Rühen
    - Tiddische
  - to Wolfsburg
    - Brackstedt
    - Kastorf
    - Neuhaus
    - Nordsteimke
    - Reislingen
    - Velstove
    - Vorsfelde
    - Warmenau
    - Wendschott
- Municipalities gained:
  - from Gifhorn
    - Ahmstorf
    - Beienrode
    - Essenrode
    - Klein Steimke
    - Ochsendorf
    - Rennau
    - Rottorf am Klei
    - Uhry
  - from Brunswick
    - Beienrode
    - Essehof
    - Flechtorf
    - Groß Brunsrode
    - Klein Brunsrode
    - Lehre
    - Wendhausen
