= Ingeleben =

- Ortsteil of Söllingen
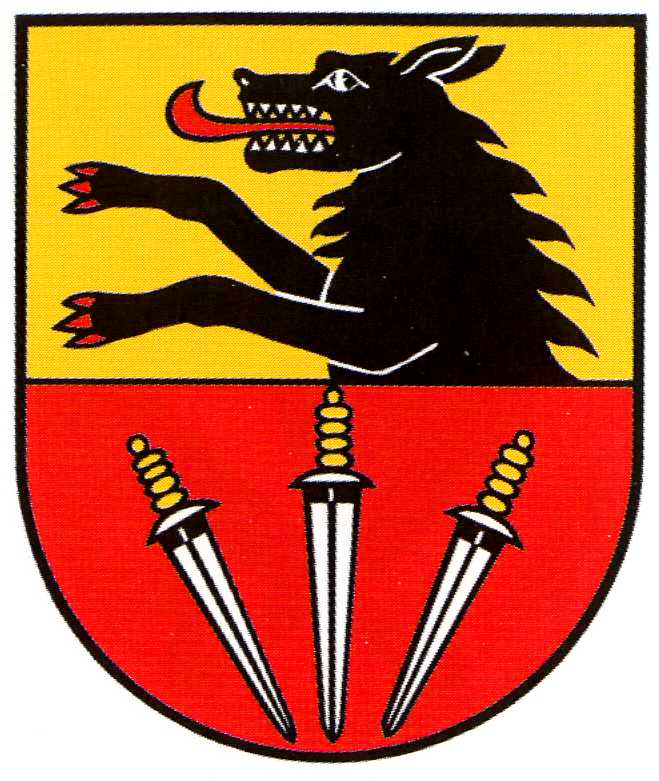
- Coat of arms
- Interactive map of Ingeleben
- Location within Germany Location within Lower Saxony
- Coordinates: 52°06′27″N 10°52′28″E
- Country: Germany
- State: Lower Saxony
- District: Helmstedt
- Municipality: Söllingen

Area
  - Total: 9.08 km^{2} (3.51 sq mi)
- Elevation: 115 m (377 ft)

Population (2015-12-31)
  - Total: 373
  - Density: 41.1/km^{2} (106/sq mi)
- Time zone: UTC+01:00 (CET)
  - Summer (DST): UTC+02:00 (CEST)
- Postal codes: 38385
- Dialling codes: 05354
- Vehicle registration: HE
- Website: www.samtgemeinde heeseberg.de

Ingeleben is a village and former municipality in the district of Helmstedt, in Lower Saxony, Germany. Since 1 November 2016 it has been part of the municipality of Söllingen.

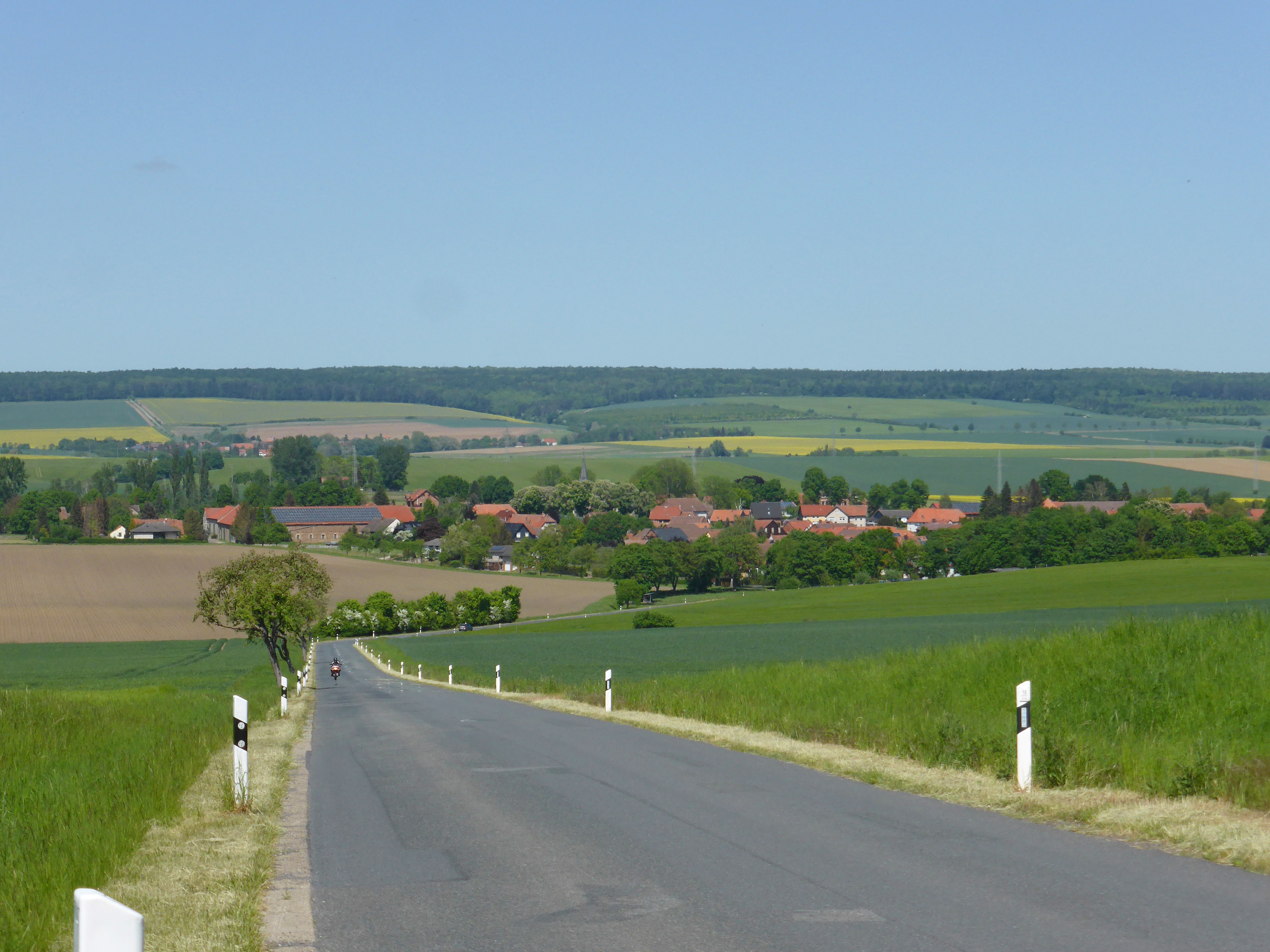
View of Ingeleben
