= Räbke =

- Municipality
- Coat of arms

- Location of Räbke within Helmstedt district
- Interactive map of Räbke
- Location within Germany Location within Lower Saxony
- Coordinates: 52°12′N 10°53′E
- Country: Germany
- State: Lower Saxony
- District: Helmstedt
- Municipal assoc.: Nord-Elm

Government
  - Mayor: Rainer Angerstein

Area
  - Total: 11.35 km^{2} (4.38 sq mi)
- Elevation: 134 m (440 ft)

Population (2025-12-31)
  - Total: 792
  - Density: 69.8/km^{2} (181/sq mi)
- Time zone: UTC+01:00 (CET)
  - Summer (DST): UTC+02:00 (CEST)
- Postal codes: 38375
- Dialling codes: 05355
- Vehicle registration: HE
- Website: www.raebke.de

Räbke is a municipality in the district of Helmstedt, in Lower Saxony, Germany. It is part of the collective municipality (Samtgemeinde) of Nord-Elm. The village is situated north of the wooded Elm hill range at the Schunter river.

The settlement was first mentioned as Ridepe in a 1205 deed. Since the 16th century Räbke was known for its paper mills meeting the needs of the University of Helmstedt.

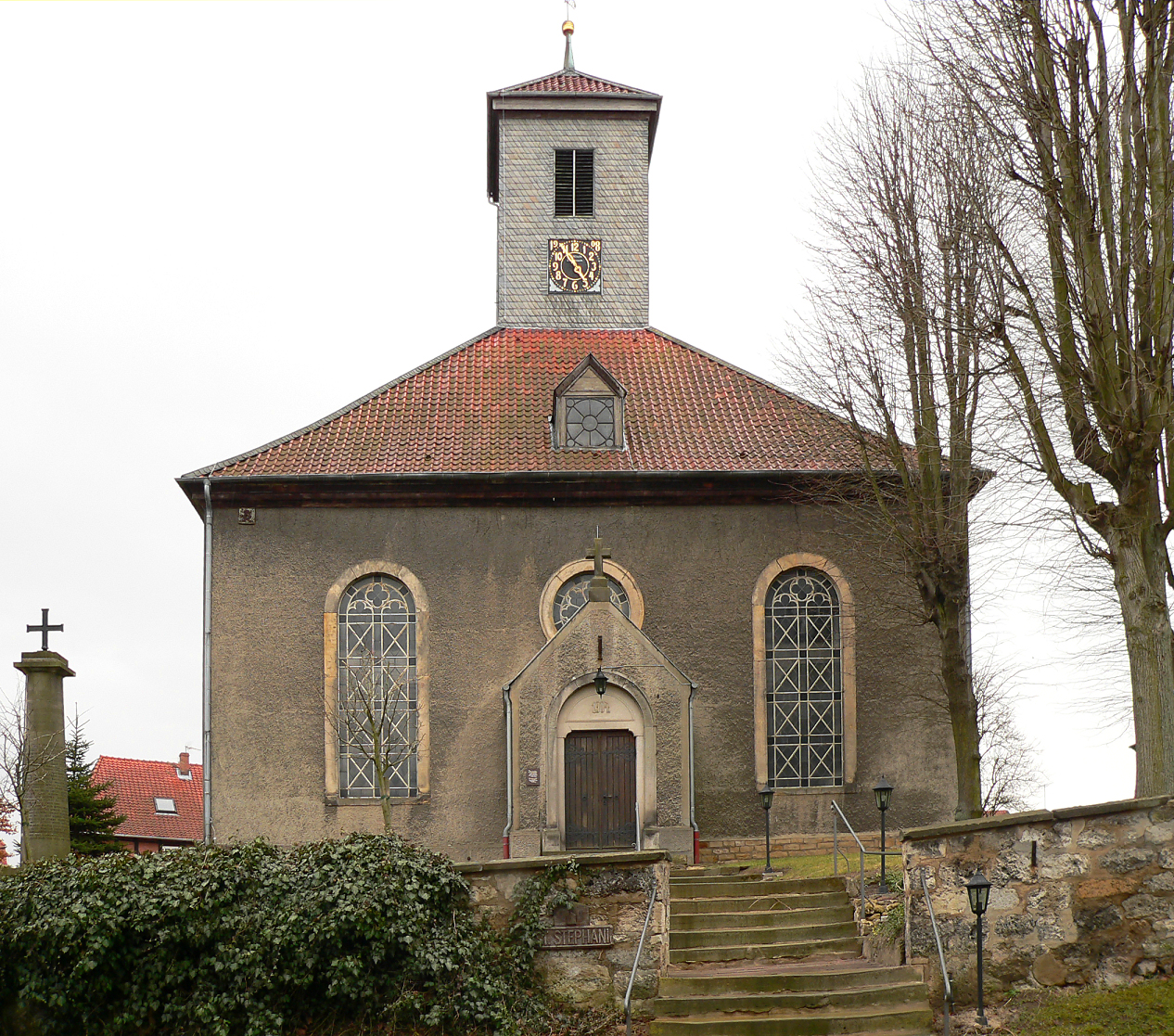
The Lutheran church
