= Groß Twülpstedt =

- Municipality
- Coat of arms

- Location of Groß Twülpstedt within Helmstedt district
- Interactive map of Groß Twülpstedt
- Location within Germany Location within Lower Saxony
- Coordinates: 52°22′N 10°55′E
- Country: Germany
- State: Lower Saxony
- District: Helmstedt
- Municipal assoc.: Velpke
- Subdivisions: 7

Government
  - Mayor: Hans-Ulrich Rothe (SPD)

Area
  - Total: 36.43 km^{2} (14.07 sq mi)
- Elevation: 103 m (338 ft)

Population (2025-12-31)
  - Total: 2,816
  - Density: 77.30/km^{2} (200.2/sq mi)
- Time zone: UTC+01:00 (CET)
  - Summer (DST): UTC+02:00 (CEST)
- Postal codes: 38464
- Dialling codes: 05364
- Vehicle registration: HE

Groß Twülpstedt is a municipality in the district of Helmstedt, in Lower Saxony, Germany. The Municipality Groß Twülpstedt includes the villages of Groß Sisbeck, Groß Twülpstedt, Klein Sisbeck, Klein Twülpstedt, Papenrode, Rümmer and Volkmarsdorf.

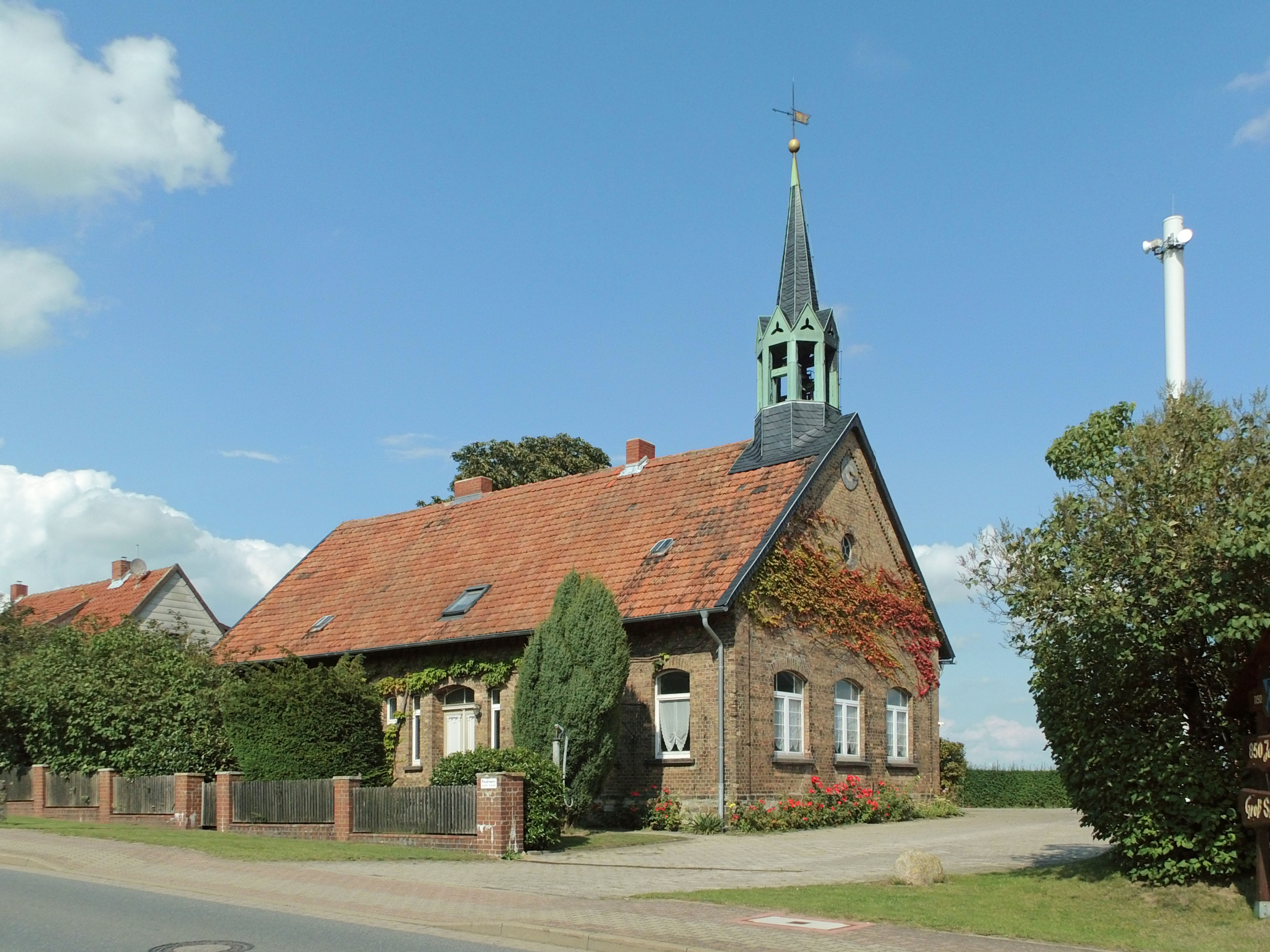
The former school in Groß Sisbeck

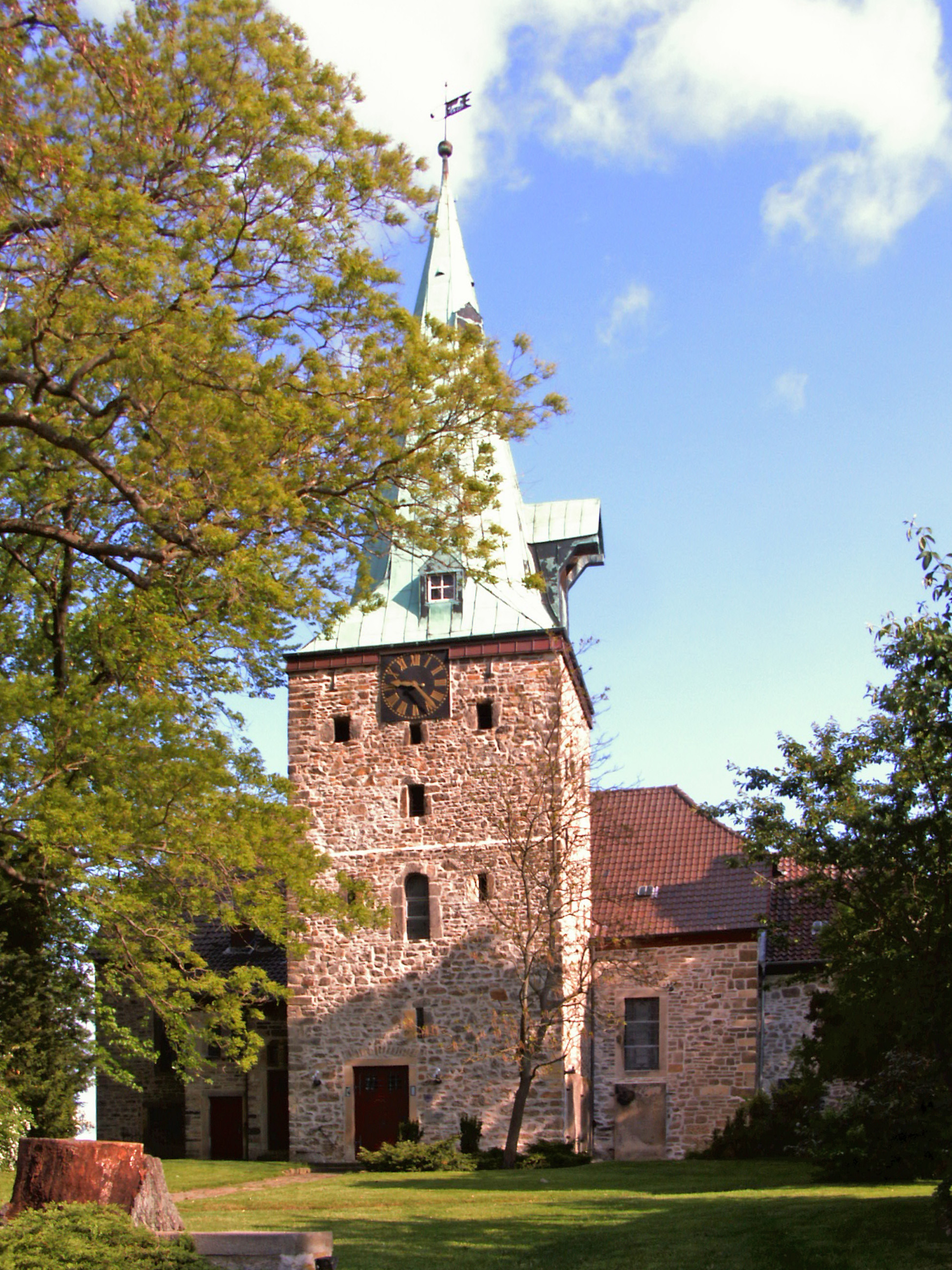
The Lutheran church in Groß Twülpstedt

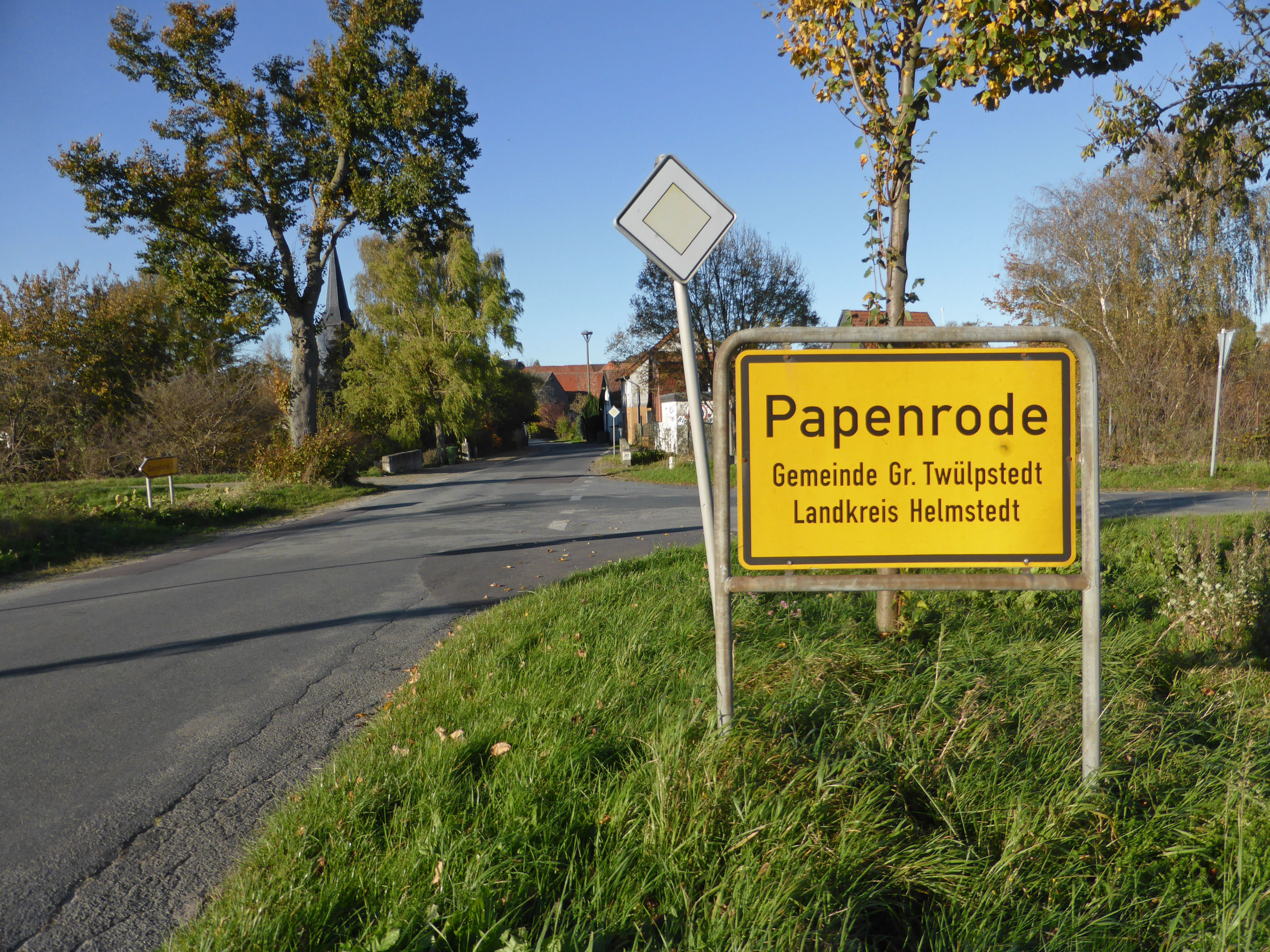
Papenrode

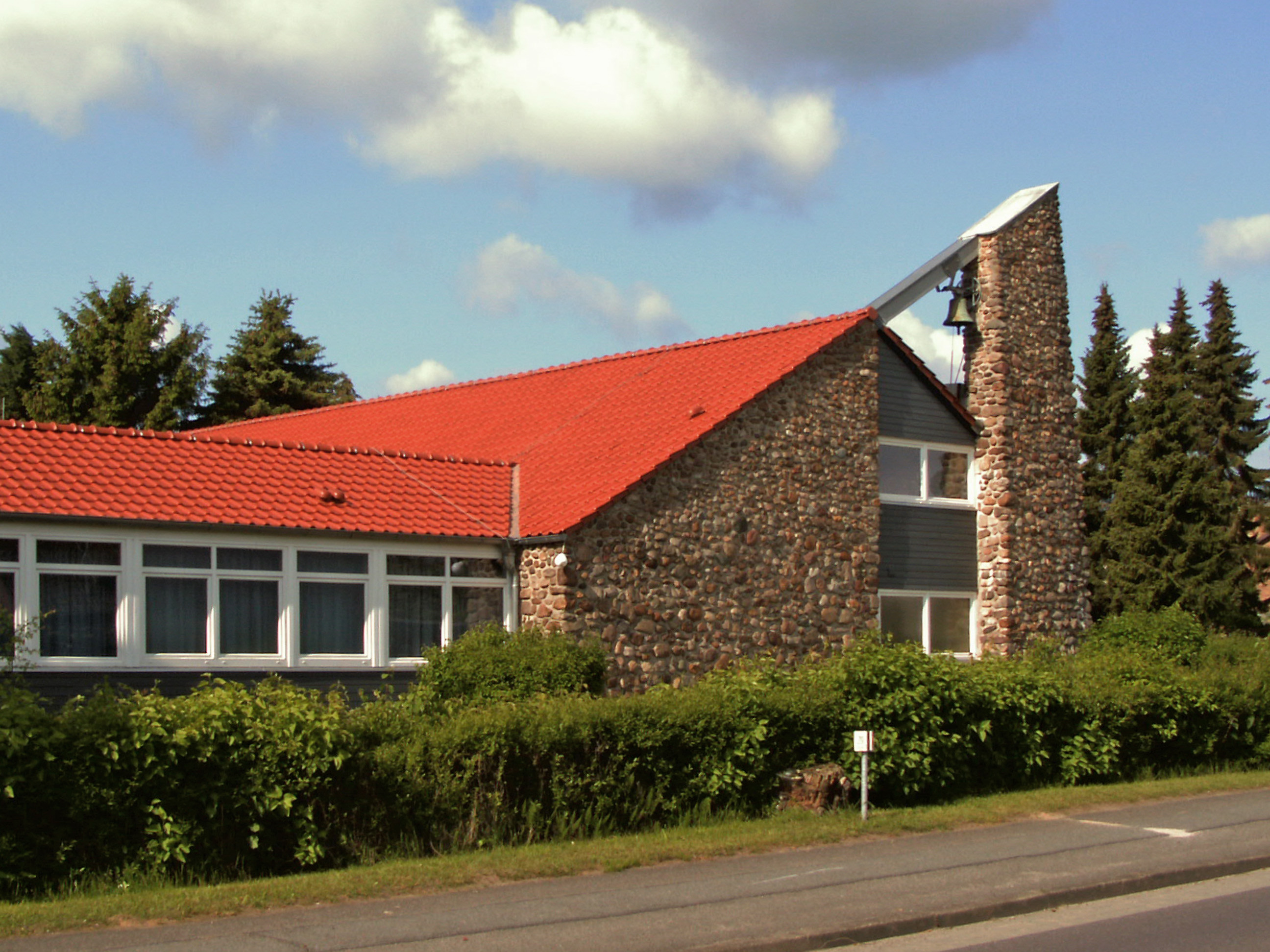
The community centre in Rümmer

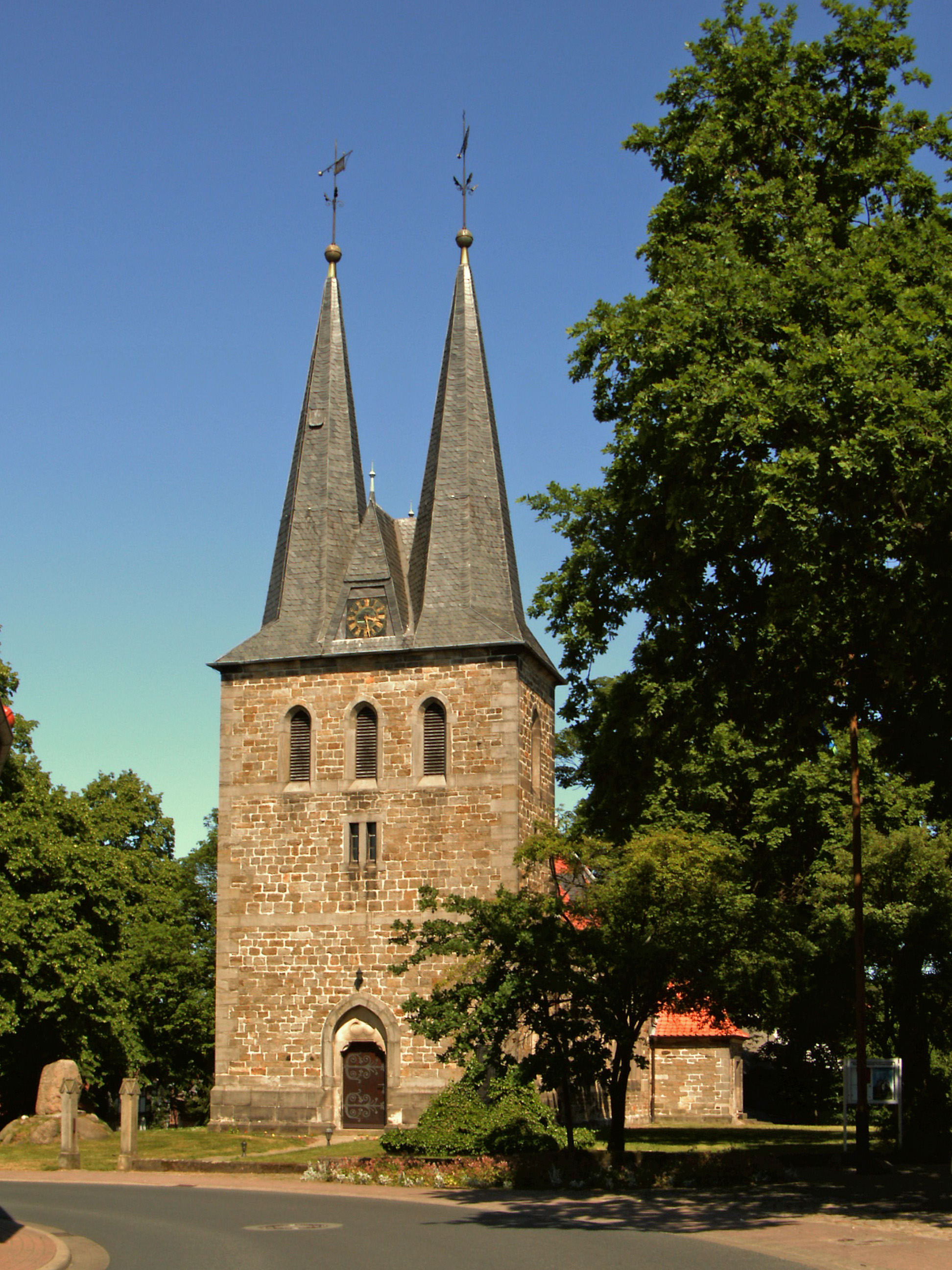
The Lutheran church in Volkmarsdorf
