= Warberg =

- Municipality
- Coat of arms

- Location of Warberg within Helmstedt district
- Interactive map of Warberg
- Location within Germany Location within Lower Saxony
- Coordinates: 52°11′N 10°56′E
- Country: Germany
- State: Lower Saxony
- District: Helmstedt
- Municipal assoc.: Nord-Elm

Government
  - Mayor: Hubert Friehe

Area
  - Total: 8.01 km^{2} (3.09 sq mi)
- Elevation: 132 m (433 ft)

Population (2025-12-31)
  - Total: 781
  - Density: 97.5/km^{2} (253/sq mi)
- Time zone: UTC+01:00 (CET)
  - Summer (DST): UTC+02:00 (CEST)
- Postal codes: 38378
- Dialling codes: 05355
- Vehicle registration: HE
- Website: www.warberg.de

Warberg is a municipality in the district of Helmstedt, in Lower Saxony, Germany.

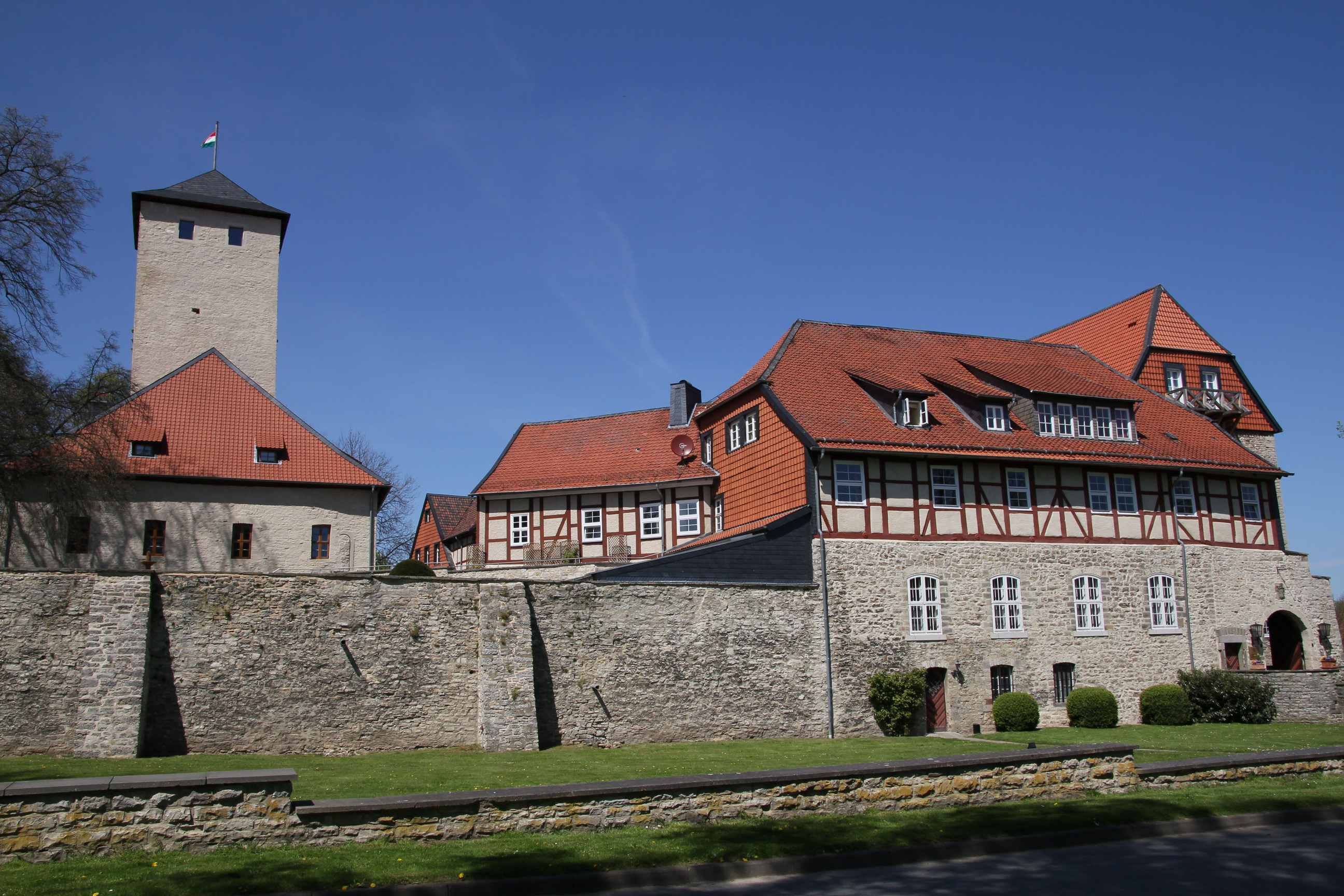
Castle Warberg
