= Nord-Elm =

- Samtgemeinde
- Location of Nord-Elm within Helmstedt district
- Interactive map of Nord-Elm
- Location within Germany Location within Lower Saxony
- Coordinates: 52°14′N 10°55′E
- Country: Germany
- State: Lower Saxony
- District: Helmstedt
- Seat: Süpplingen
- Subdivisions: 6 municipalities

Area
  - Total: 63.38 km^{2} (24.47 sq mi)

Population (2025-12-31)
  - Total: 5,635
  - Density: 88.91/km^{2} (230.3/sq mi)
- Time zone: UTC+01:00 (CET)
  - Summer (DST): UTC+02:00 (CEST)
- Website: www.samtgemeinde-nord-elm.de

Nord-Elm is a federation of municipalities (Samtgemeinde) in Helmstedt, Lower Saxony. Its seat is Süpplingen. It is a rural community, located in the Elm hills from which it receives its name. Nord-Elm has an area of 63.32 square kilometres (24.45 mi^{2}) and a population of around 5,634 people.

Its member municipalities are Frellstedt, Räbke, Süpplingen, Süpplingenburg, Warberg, and Wolsdorf.

== History ==
After a union ceremony on 16 December 1969, Nord-Elm was officially founded in 1970. They planned to celebrate the 50th anniversary of the founding in 2020, but it was postponed due to the worldwide COVID-19 pandemic. The celebration eventually took place on 22 May 2022.
