= Büddenstedt =

- Ortsteil of Helmstedt
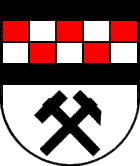
- Coat of arms
- Interactive map of Büddenstedt
- Location within Germany Location within Lower Saxony
- Coordinates: 52°10′N 11°0′E
- Country: Germany
- State: Lower Saxony
- District: Helmstedt
- Town: Helmstedt

Area
  - Total: 19.54 km^{2} (7.54 sq mi)
- Elevation: 99 m (325 ft)

Population (2006-12-31)
  - Total: 3,020
  - Density: 155/km^{2} (400/sq mi)
- Time zone: UTC+01:00 (CET)
  - Summer (DST): UTC+02:00 (CEST)
- Postal codes: 38372
- Dialling codes: 05352
- Vehicle registration: HE

Büddenstedt is a former municipality in the district of Helmstedt, in Lower Saxony, Germany. It is situated approximately 6 km (4 miles) south of the town of Helmstedt into which it was incorporated on 1 July 2017 as a quarter.

== History ==
Büddenstedt was formed 1 March 1974 by combining the municipalities Neu Büddenstedt, Offleben, and Reinsdorf/Hohnsleben. Neu Büddenstedt was settled in 1935 between a prior municipality named Büddenstedt and Wulfersdorf, both of which were slated for demolition due to coal mining. The previous Büddensted was finally fully evacuated in 1947 while Neu Büddensted became a municipality in 1950.

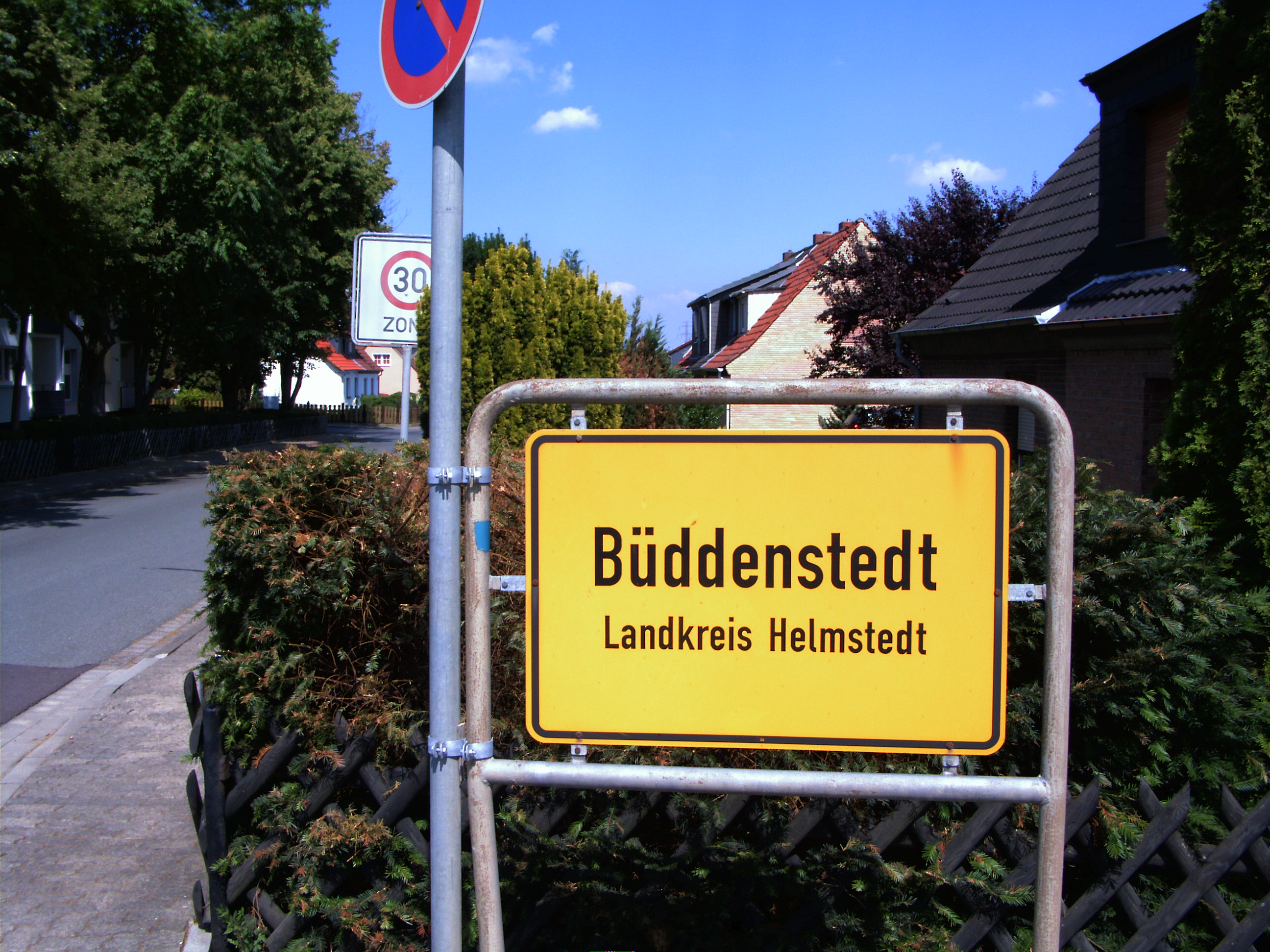
Büddenstedt

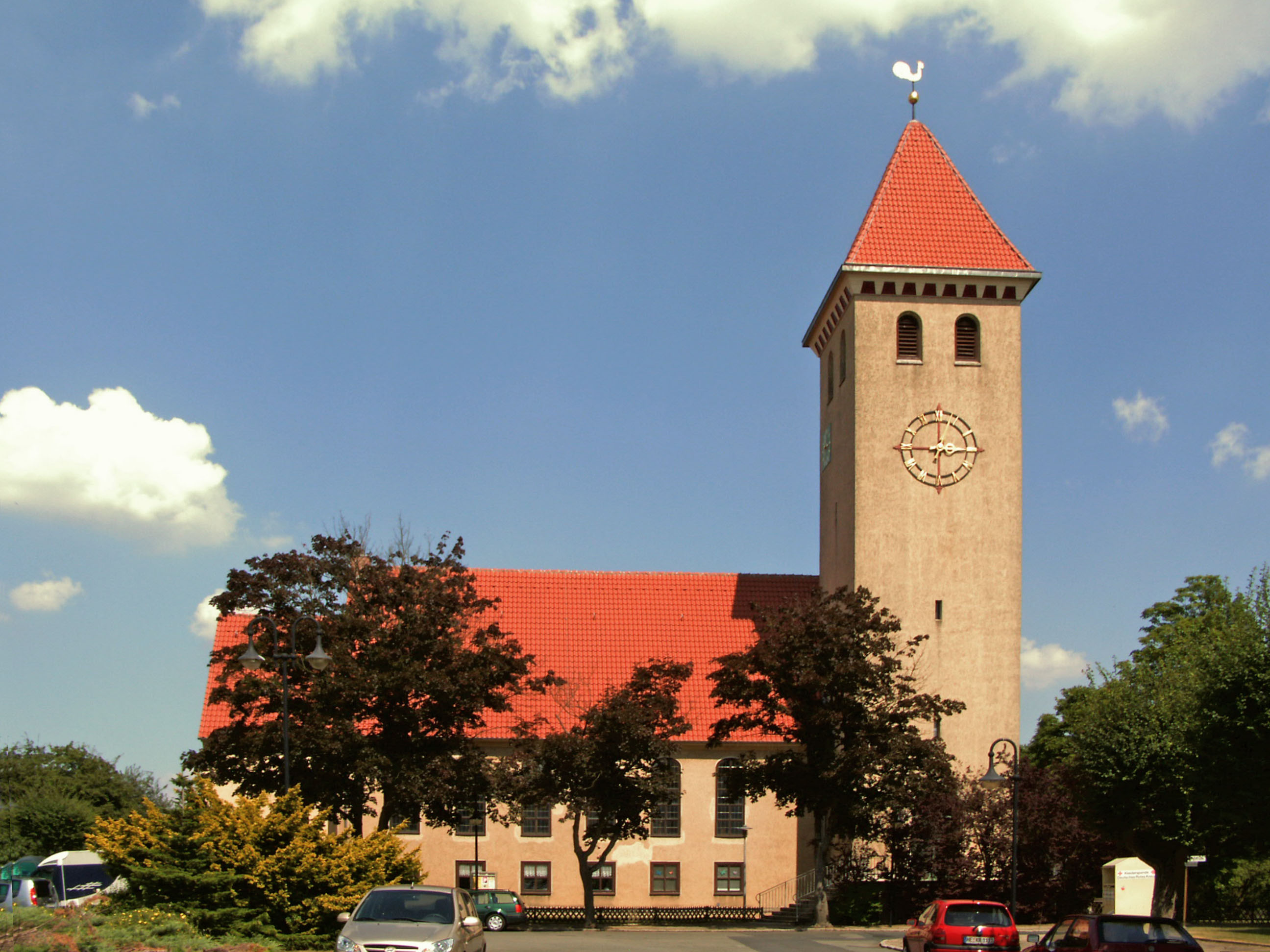
The Lutheran church

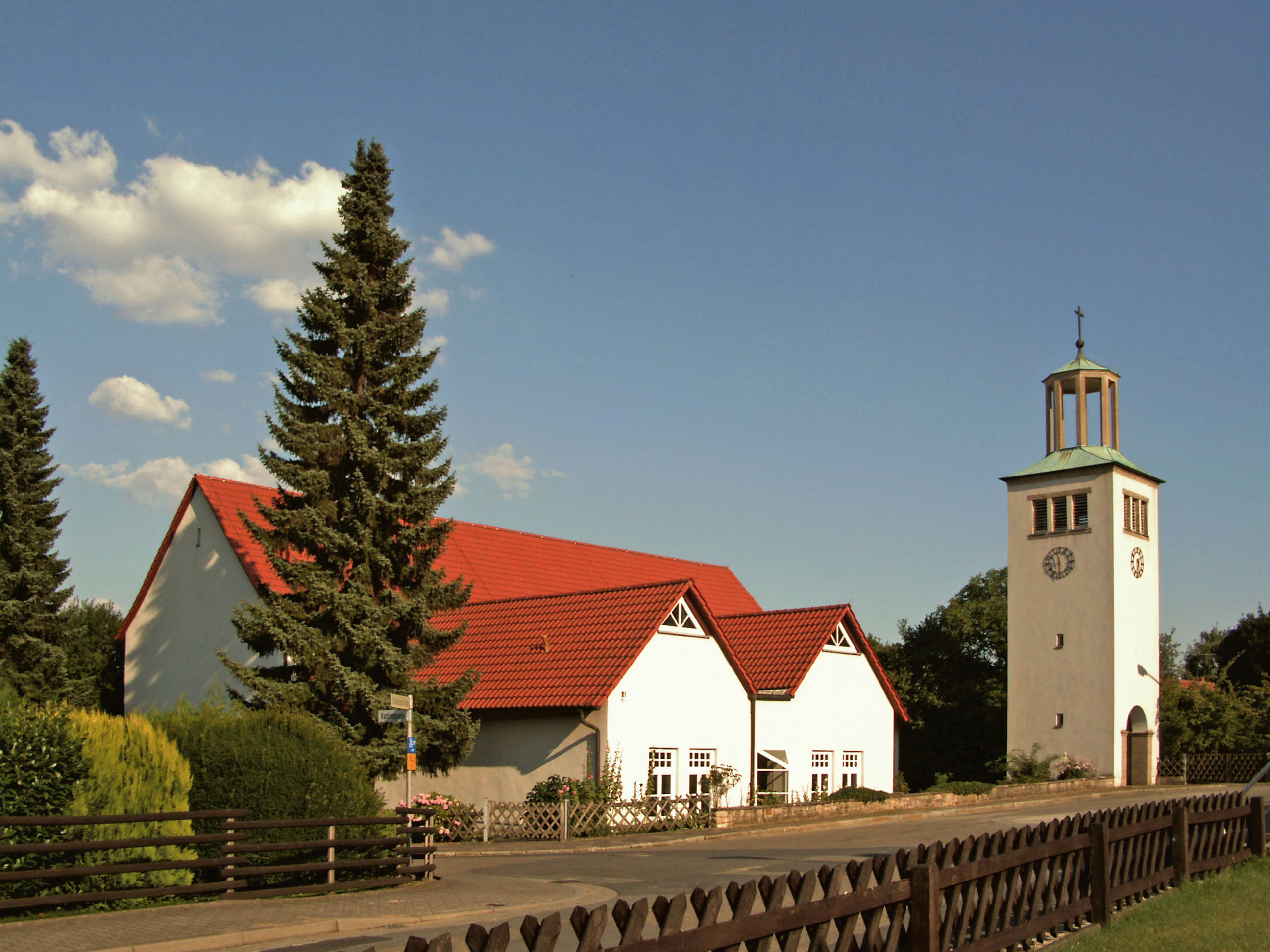
The Catholic church

== Twin towns – sister cities ==
Büddenstedt is twinned with:

- Mondeville, France since 1973
