= Söllingen =

- Municipality
- Coat of arms

- Location of Söllingen within Helmstedt district
- Interactive map of Söllingen
- Location within Germany Location within Lower Saxony
- Coordinates: 52°05′N 10°56′E
- Country: Germany
- State: Lower Saxony
- District: Helmstedt
- Municipal assoc.: Heeseberg

Government
  - Mayor: Heinz Bosse

Area
  - Total: 39.41 km^{2} (15.22 sq mi)
- Elevation: 104 m (341 ft)

Population (2025-12-31)
  - Total: 1,471
  - Density: 37.33/km^{2} (96.67/sq mi)
- Time zone: UTC+01:00 (CET)
  - Summer (DST): UTC+02:00 (CEST)
- Postal codes: 38387
- Dialling codes: 05354
- Vehicle registration: HE
- Website: www.samtgemeinde-heeseberg.de

Söllingen is a municipality in the district of Helmstedt, in Lower Saxony, Germany. The Municipality Söllingen includes the villages of Dobbeln, Söllingen and Wobeck. And since 1 November 2016, the former municipalities Ingeleben and Twieflingen are part of the municipality Söllingen.

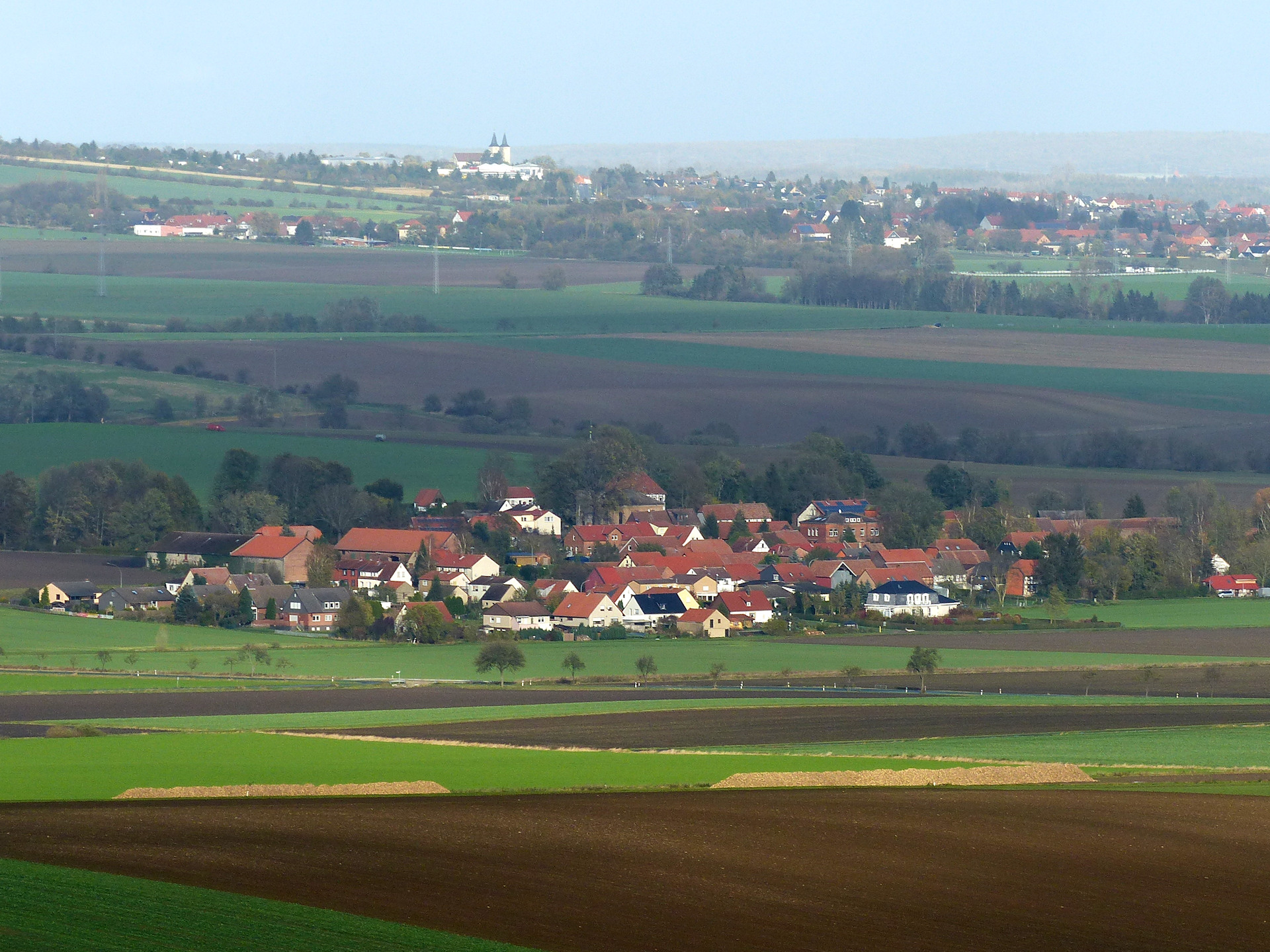
Dobbeln, in the background Schöningen
