= Velpke =

- Municipality
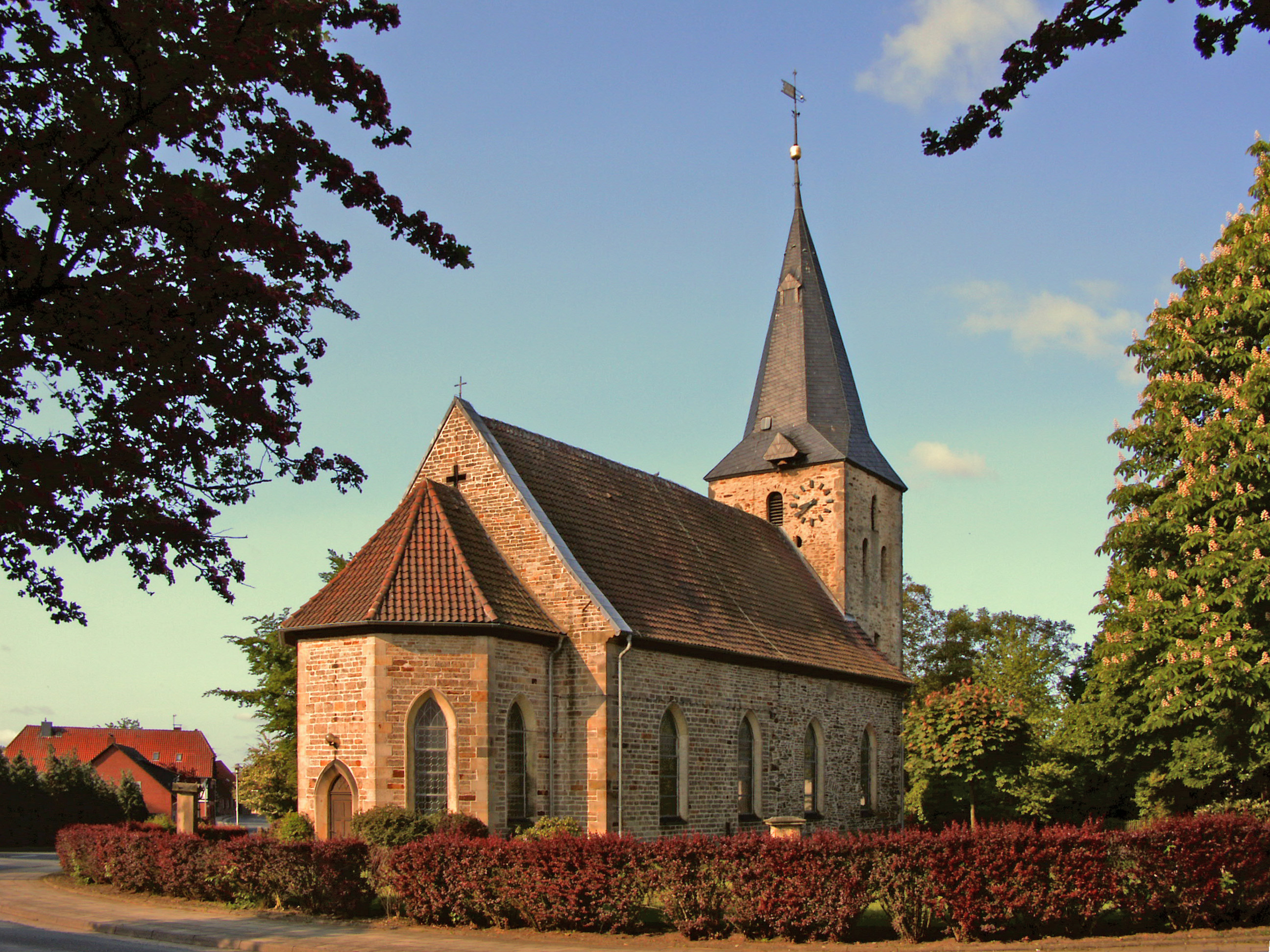
- The Lutheran church in Velpke

- Coat of arms

- Location of Velpke within Helmstedt district
- Interactive map of Velpke
- Location within Germany Location within Lower Saxony
- Coordinates: 52°24′N 10°56′E
- Country: Germany
- State: Lower Saxony
- District: Helmstedt
- Municipal assoc.: Velpke
- Subdivisions: 3

Government
  - Mayor: Mark Kreutzberg

Area
  - Total: 19.70 km^{2} (7.61 sq mi)
- Elevation: 77 m (253 ft)

Population (2025-12-31)
  - Total: 4,966
  - Density: 252.1/km^{2} (652.9/sq mi)
- Time zone: UTC+01:00 (CET)
  - Summer (DST): UTC+02:00 (CEST)
- Postal codes: 38458
- Dialling codes: 05364
- Vehicle registration: HE
- Website: www.velpke.de

Velpke is a municipality in the district of Helmstedt, in Lower Saxony, Germany. It is situated approximately 20 km north of Helmstedt, and 10 km east of Wolfsburg. The Municipality Velpke includes the villages of Büstedt, Meinkot, Velpke and Wahrstedt. Velpke is also the seat of the Samtgemeinde ("collective municipality") Velpke.

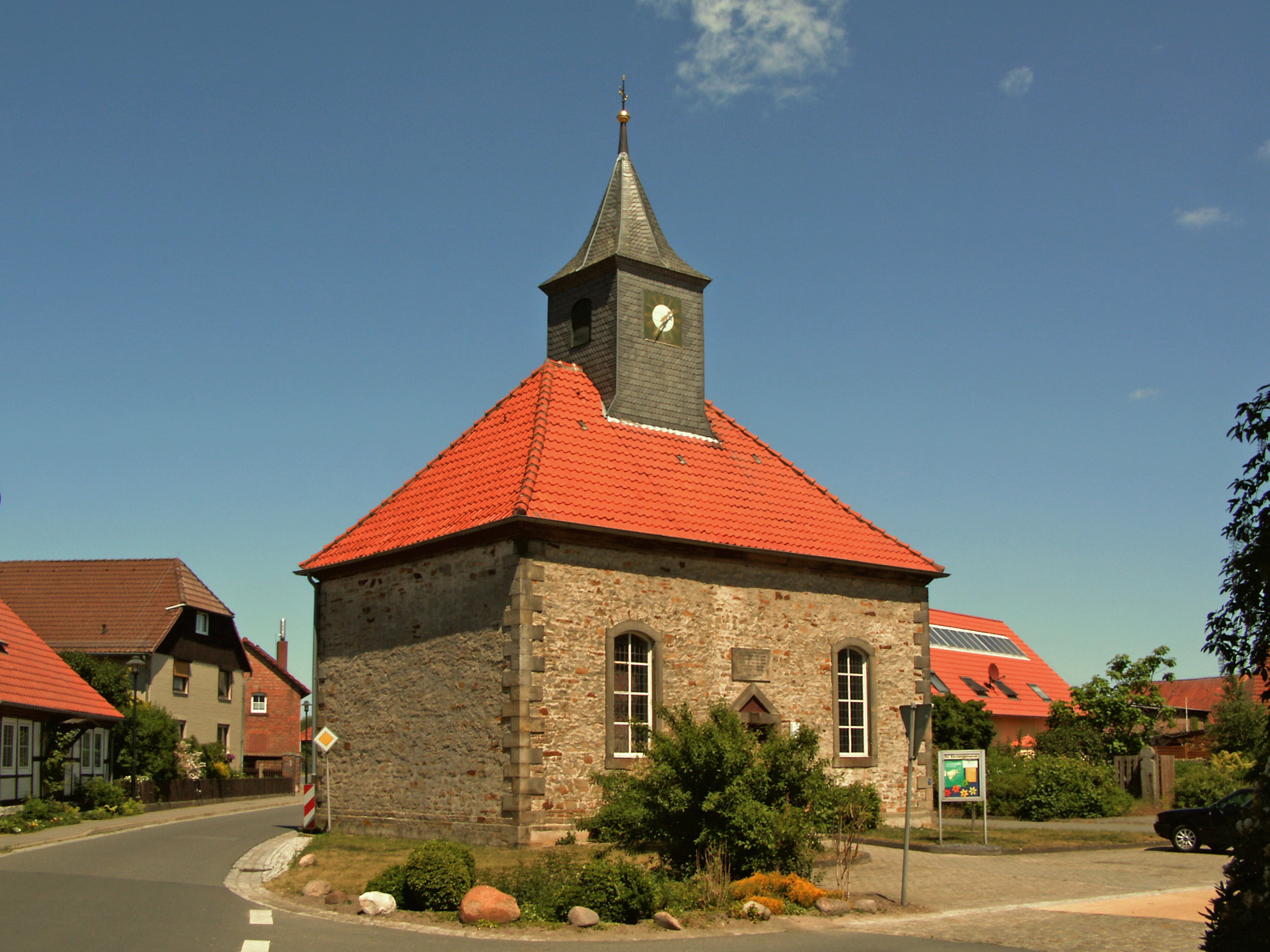
The Lutheran church in Meinkot

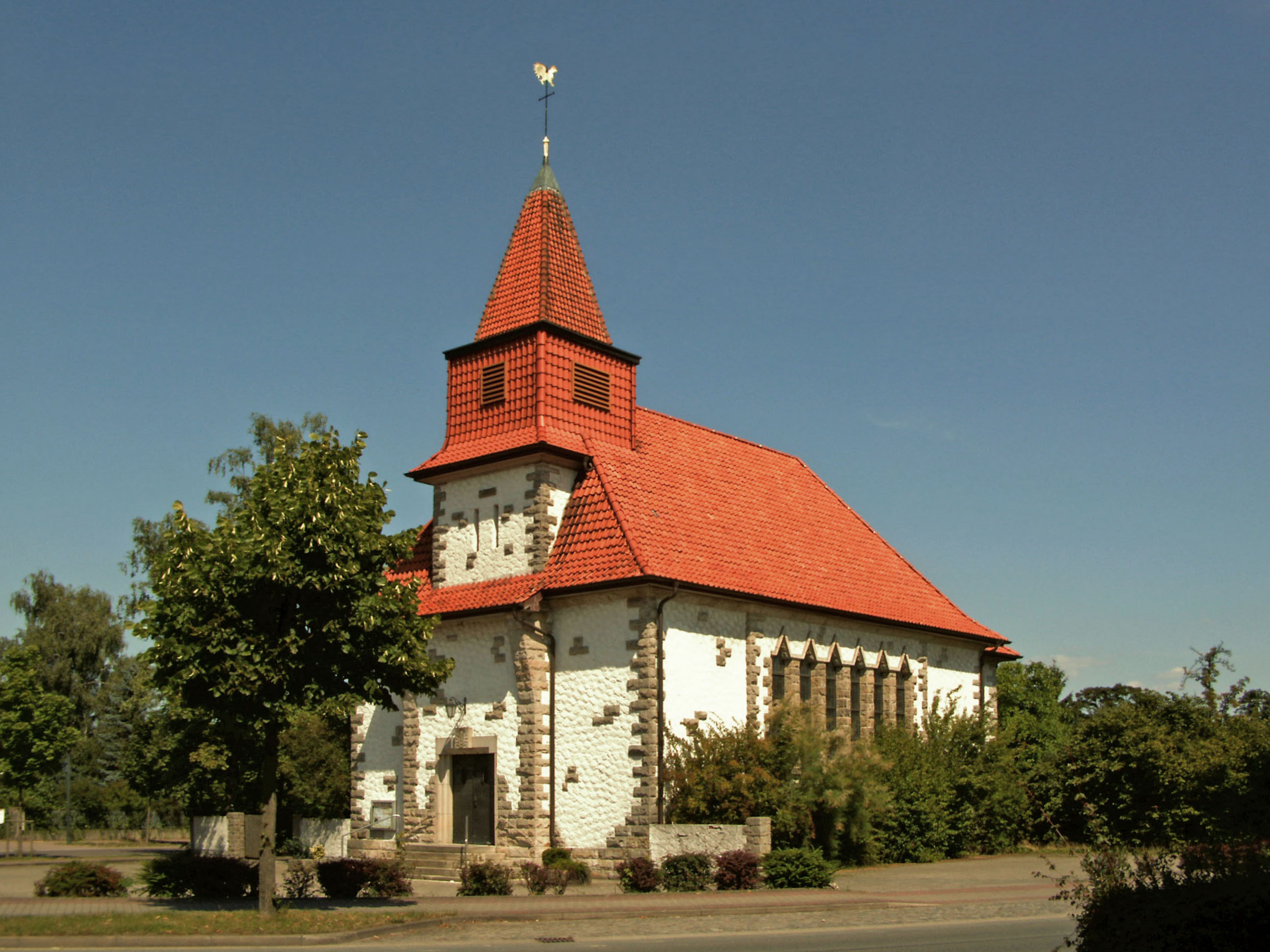
The catholic church in Velpke

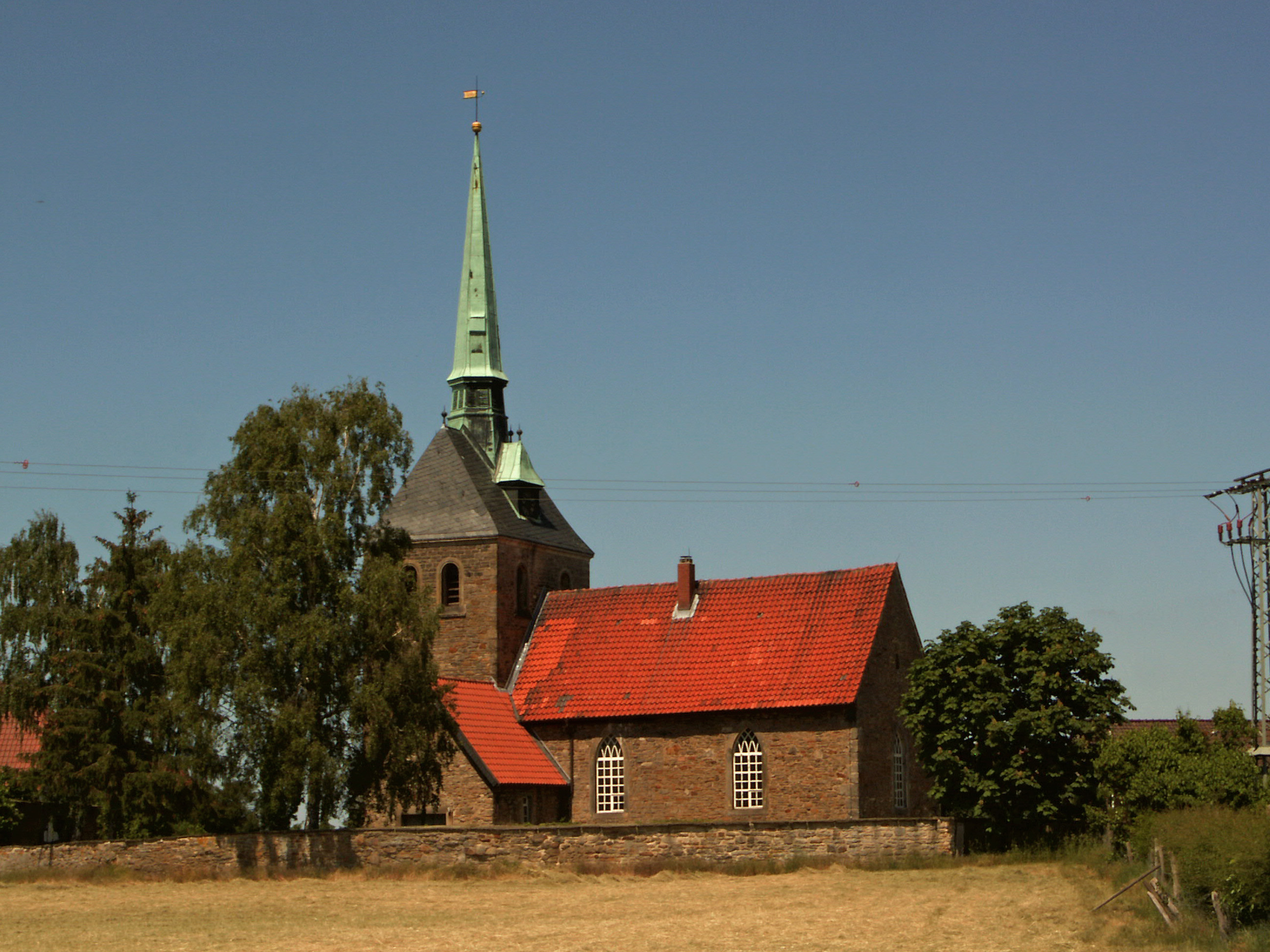
The Lutheran church in Wahrstedt
