= Danndorf =

- Municipality
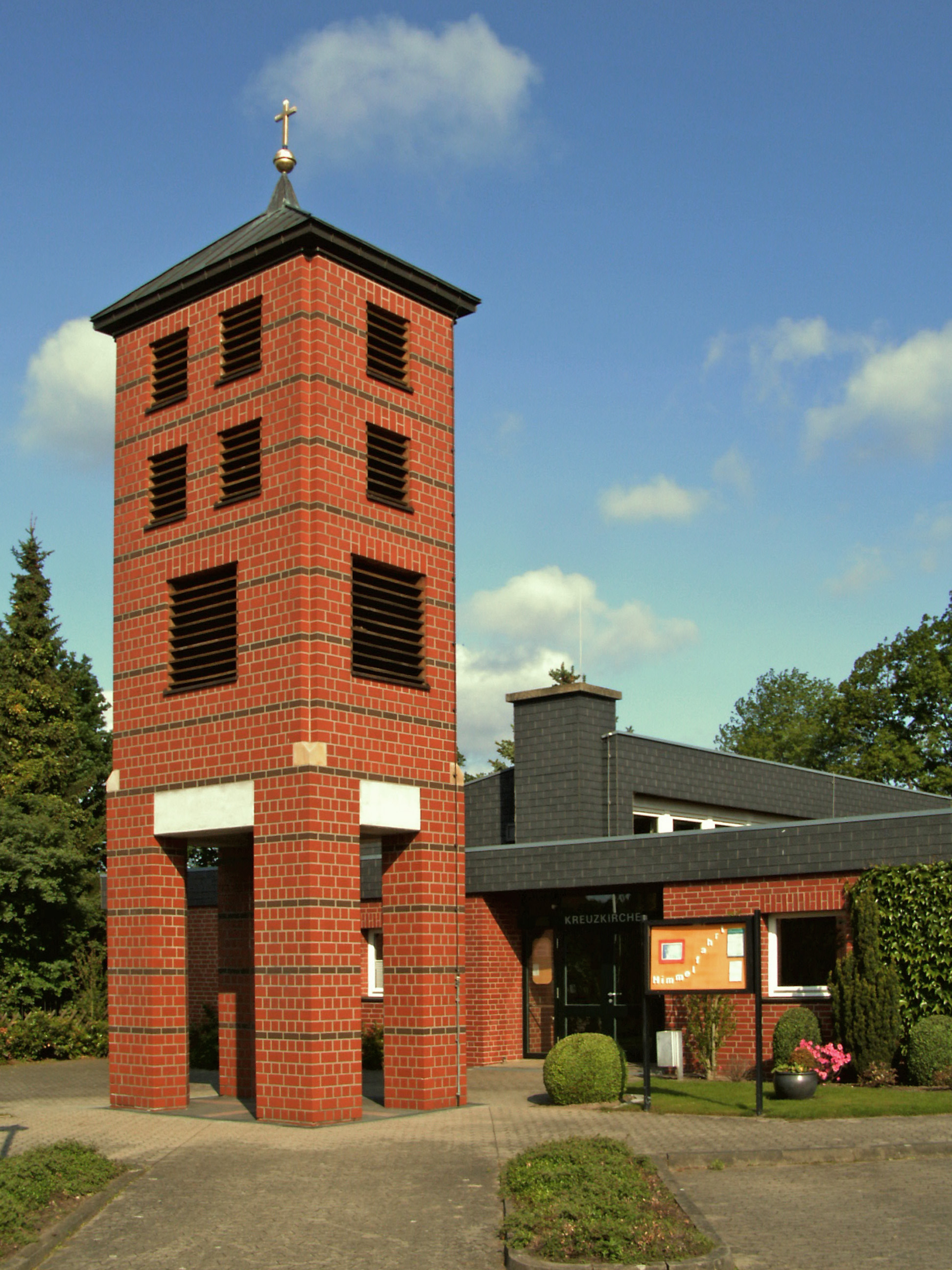
- The Lutheran church in Danndorf

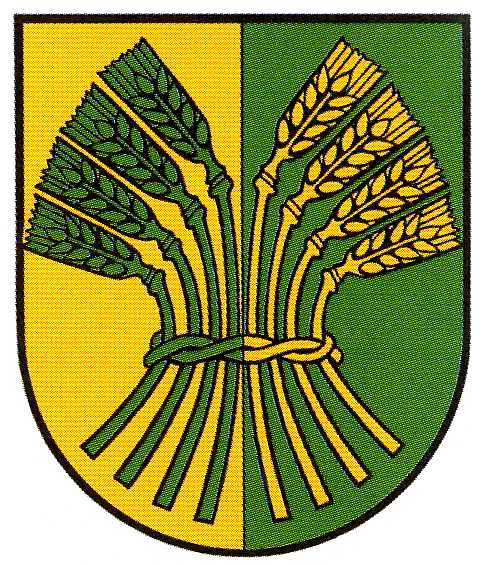
- Coat of arms

- Location of Danndorf within Helmstedt district
- Interactive map of Danndorf
- Location within Germany Location within Lower Saxony
- Coordinates: 52°25′47″N 10°55′00″E
- Country: Germany
- State: Lower Saxony
- District: Helmstedt
- Municipal assoc.: Velpke

Government
  - Mayor: Diethelm Müller

Area
  - Total: 14.04 km^{2} (5.42 sq mi)
- Elevation: 58 m (190 ft)

Population (2025-12-31)
  - Total: 2,520
  - Density: 179/km^{2} (465/sq mi)
- Time zone: UTC+01:00 (CET)
  - Summer (DST): UTC+02:00 (CEST)
- Postal codes: 38461
- Dialling codes: 05364
- Vehicle registration: HE
- Website: www.danndorf.de

Danndorf is a municipality in the district of Helmstedt, in Lower Saxony, Germany.
