= Velpke (Samtgemeinde) =

Samtgemeinde in Lower Saxony

- Samtgemeinde
- Coat of arms

- Location of Velpke within Helmstedt district
- Interactive map of Velpke
- Location within Germany Location within Lower Saxony
- Coordinates: 52°24′N 10°56′E
- Country: Germany
- State: Lower Saxony
- District: Helmstedt
- Seat: Velpke
- Subdivisions: 5 municipalities

Area
  - Total: 120.67 km^{2} (46.59 sq mi)

Population (2025-12-31)
  - Total: 13,136
  - Density: 108.86/km^{2} (281.94/sq mi)
- Time zone: UTC+01:00 (CET)
  - Summer (DST): UTC+02:00 (CEST)
- Website: www.velpke.de

Velpke is a Samtgemeinde ("collective municipality") in the district of Helmstedt, in Lower Saxony, Germany. Its seat is in the village Velpke.

== Municipalities ==
The Samtgemeinde Velpke consists of the following municipalities:

1. Bahrdorf
2. Danndorf
3. Grafhorst
4. Groß Twülpstedt
5. Velpke

== Fire departments ==
In February 2024, the fire brigades of the collective municipality were called to fight a major fire at a biogas plant in Büstedt.
