= Grafhorst, Germany =

Grafhorst
- Municipality
- Coat of arms

- Location of Grafhorst within Helmstedt district
- Interactive map of Grafhorst
- Location within Germany Location within Lower Saxony
- Coordinates: 52°27′N 10°57′E
- Country: Germany
- State: Lower Saxony
- District: Helmstedt
- Municipal assoc.: Velpke

Government
  - Mayor: Klaus Wenzel (SPD)

Area
  - Total: 9.65 km^{2} (3.73 sq mi)
- Elevation: 58 m (190 ft)

Population (2025-12-31)
  - Total: 1,092
  - Density: 113/km^{2} (293/sq mi)
- Time zone: UTC+01:00 (CET)
  - Summer (DST): UTC+02:00 (CEST)
- Postal codes: 38462
- Dialling codes: 05364
- Vehicle registration: HE
- Website: www.grafhorst.de

Grafhorst is a municipality in the district of Helmstedt, in Lower Saxony, Germany.

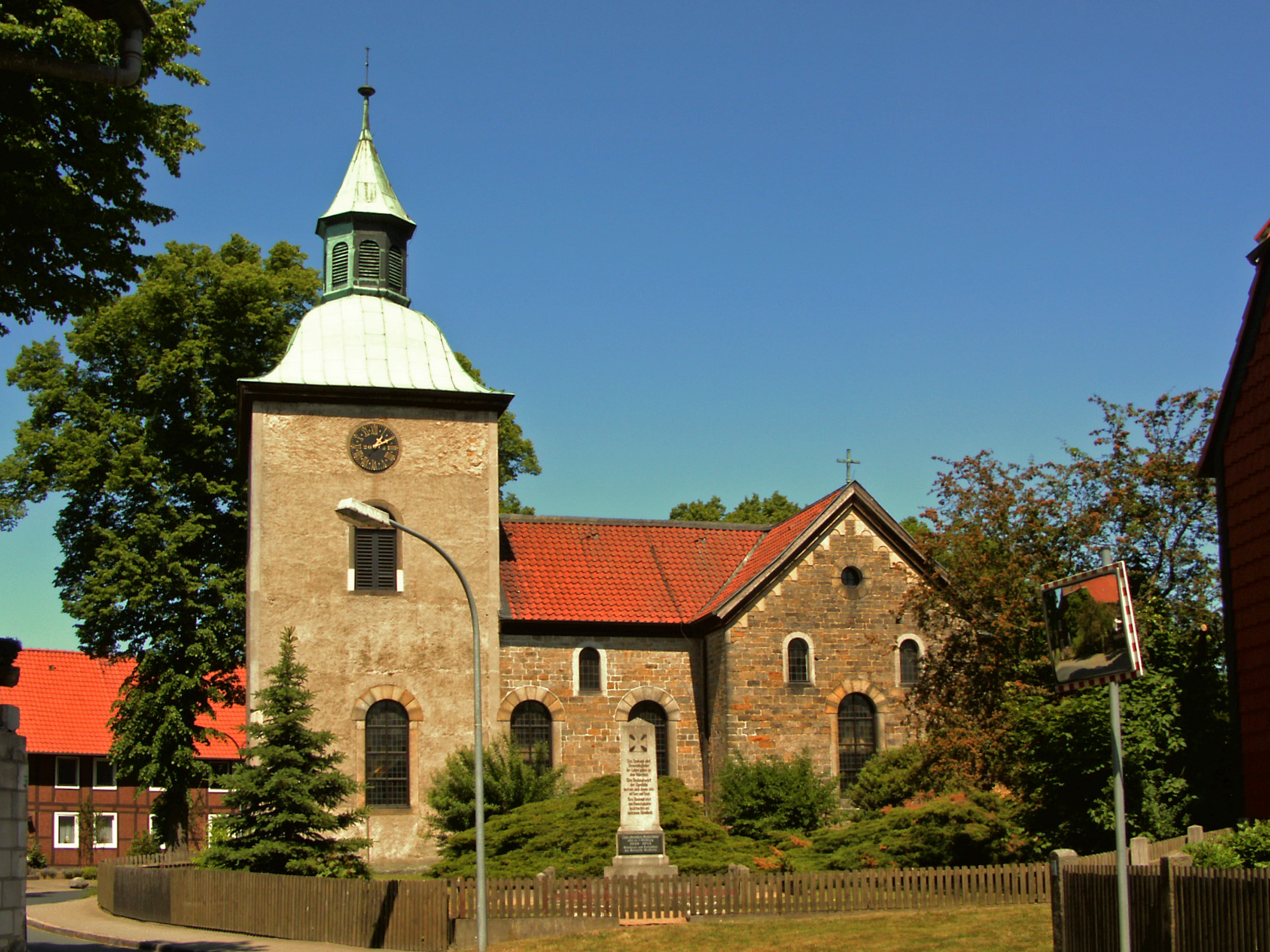
The Lutheran church
