= Frellstedt =

Municipality in Germany

- Municipality
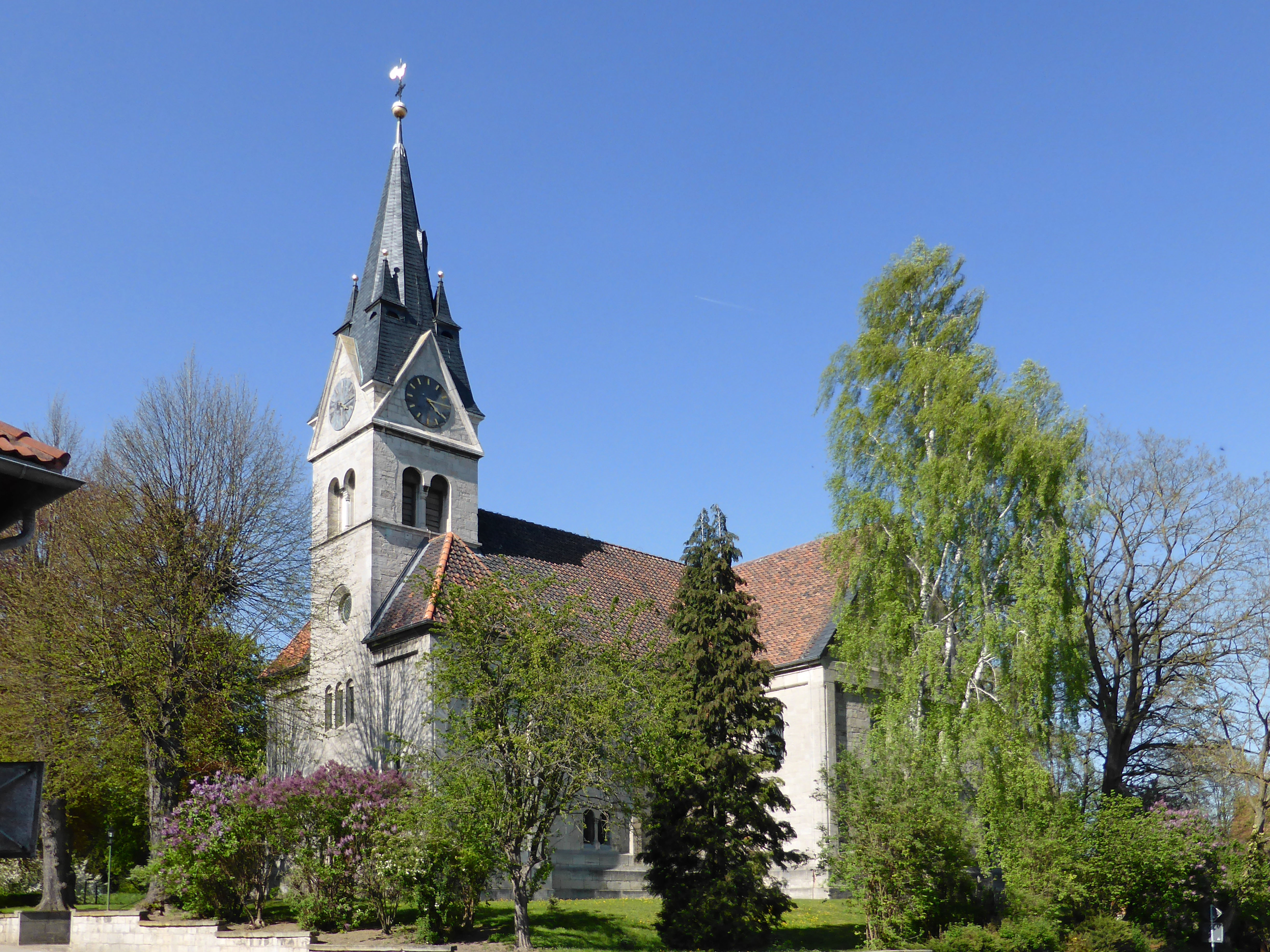

- Coat of arms

- Location of Frellstedt within Helmstedt district
- Interactive map of Frellstedt
- Location within Germany Location within Lower Saxony
- Coordinates: 52°13′N 10°55′E
- Country: Germany
- State: Lower Saxony
- District: Helmstedt
- Municipal assoc.: Nord-Elm

Government
  - Mayor: Christian Buttler

Area
  - Total: 6.15 km^{2} (2.37 sq mi)
- Elevation: 122 m (400 ft)

Population (2025-12-31)
  - Total: 832
  - Density: 135/km^{2} (350/sq mi)
- Time zone: UTC+01:00 (CET)
  - Summer (DST): UTC+02:00 (CEST)
- Postal codes: 38373
- Dialling codes: 05355
- Vehicle registration: HE
- Website: www.samtgemeinde-nord-elm.de

Frellstedt (German pronunciation: [ˈfʁɛlʃtɛt]) is a municipality in the district of Helmstedt, in Lower Saxony, Germany.
