= Wolsdorf =

- Municipality
- Coat of arms

- Location of Wolsdorf within Helmstedt district
- Interactive map of Wolsdorf
- Location within Germany Location within Lower Saxony
- Coordinates: 52°12′N 10°57′E
- Country: Germany
- State: Lower Saxony
- District: Helmstedt
- Municipal assoc.: Nord-Elm

Government
  - Mayor: Heinz Schmidt

Area
  - Total: 13.17 km^{2} (5.08 sq mi)
- Elevation: 133 m (436 ft)

Population (2025-12-31)
  - Total: 914
  - Density: 69.4/km^{2} (180/sq mi)
- Time zone: UTC+01:00 (CET)
  - Summer (DST): UTC+02:00 (CEST)
- Postal codes: 38379
- Dialling codes: 05355
- Vehicle registration: HE
- Website: www.samtgemeinde-nord-elm.de

Wolsdorf is a municipality in the district of Helmstedt, in Lower Saxony, Germany.

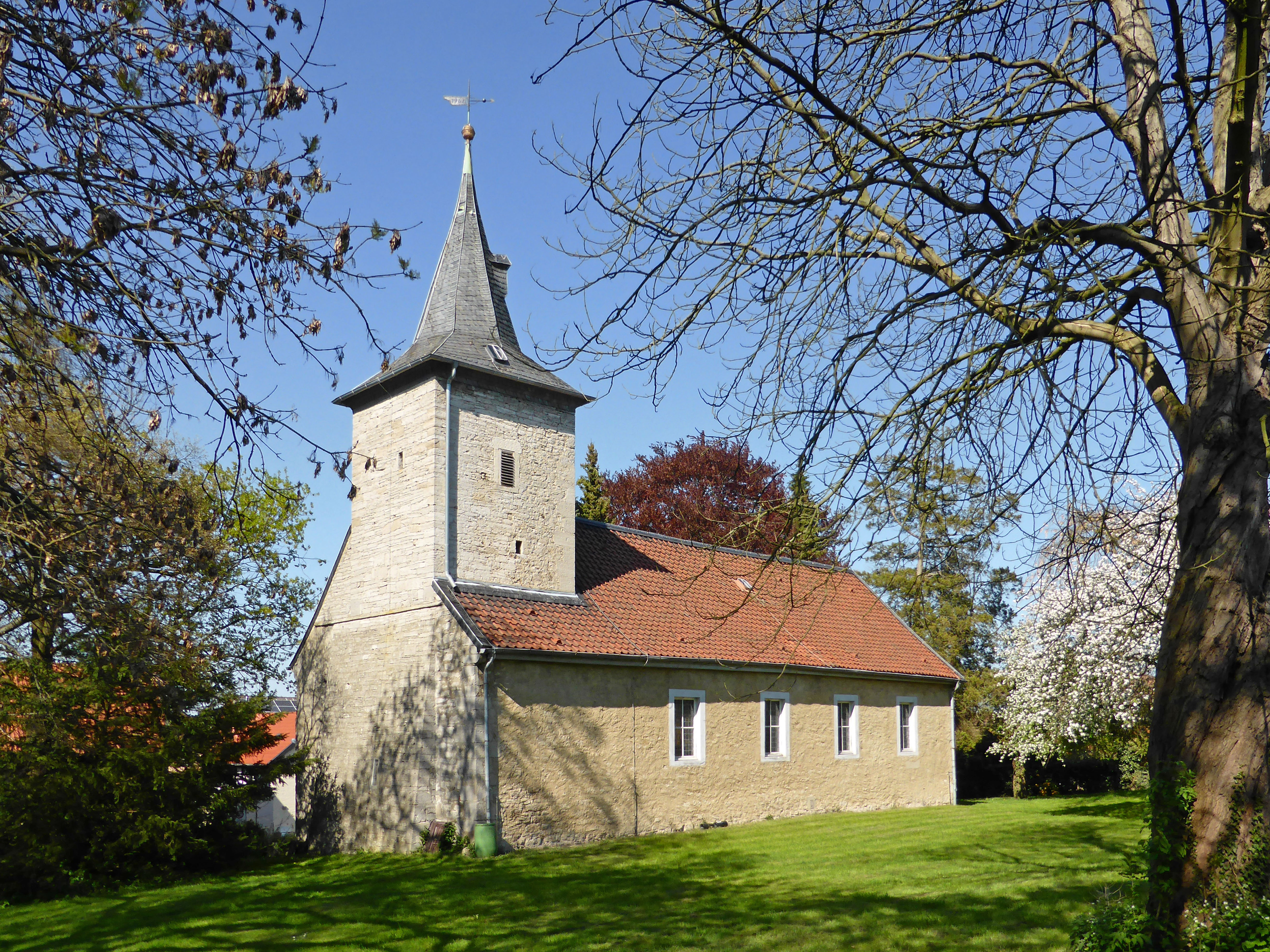
The Lutheran church

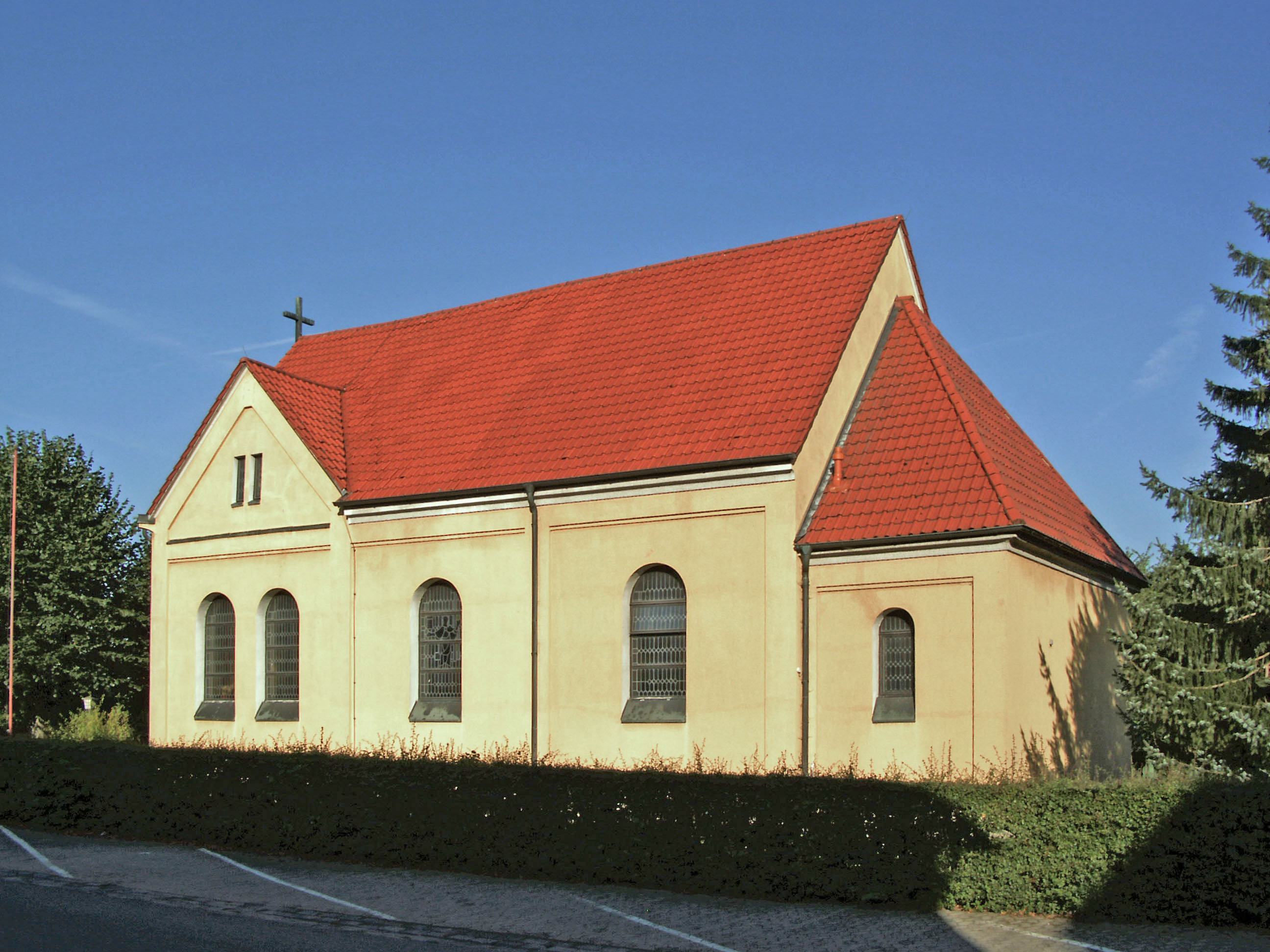
The catholic church
