= Rennau =

- Municipality
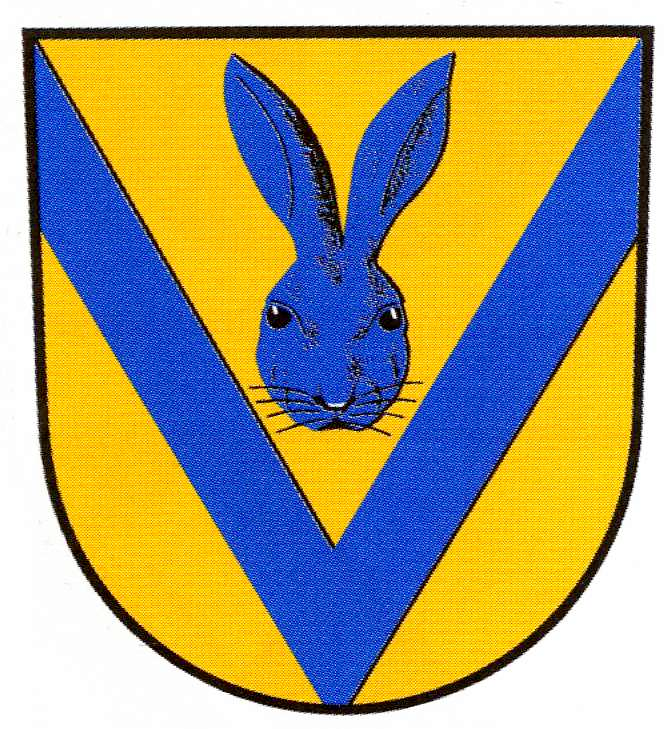
- Coat of arms

- Location of Rennau within Helmstedt district
- Interactive map of Rennau
- Location within Germany Location within Lower Saxony
- Coordinates: 52°18′N 10°55′E
- Country: Germany
- State: Lower Saxony
- District: Helmstedt
- Municipal assoc.: Grasleben
- Subdivisions: 3

Government
  - Mayor: Jörg Minkley (CDU)

Area
  - Total: 22.6 km^{2} (8.7 sq mi)
- Elevation: 114 m (374 ft)

Population (2025-12-31)
  - Total: 721
  - Density: 31.9/km^{2} (82.6/sq mi)
- Time zone: UTC+01:00 (CET)
  - Summer (DST): UTC+02:00 (CEST)
- Postal codes: 38368
- Dialling codes: 05356 / 05365
- Vehicle registration: HE
- Website: www.grasleben.de

Rennau is a municipality in the district of Helmstedt, in Lower Saxony, Germany. The Municipality Rennau includes the villages of Ahmstorf, Rennau and Rottorf am Klei.

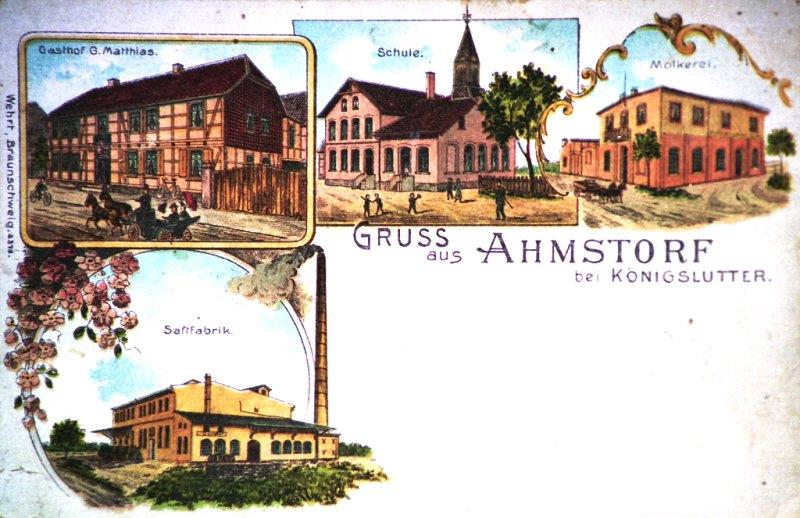
Old postcard of Ahmstorf

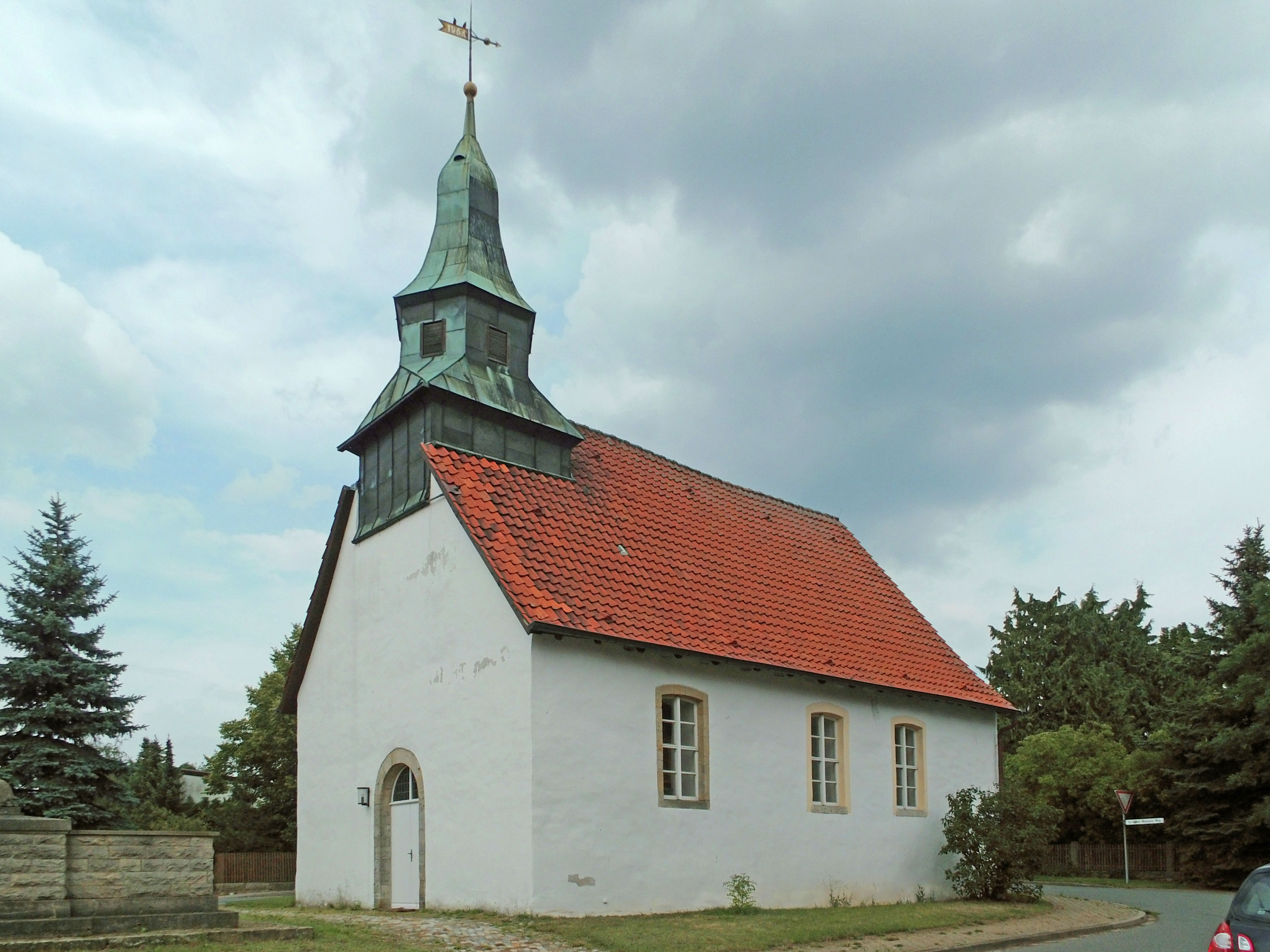
The Lutheran church in Rennau

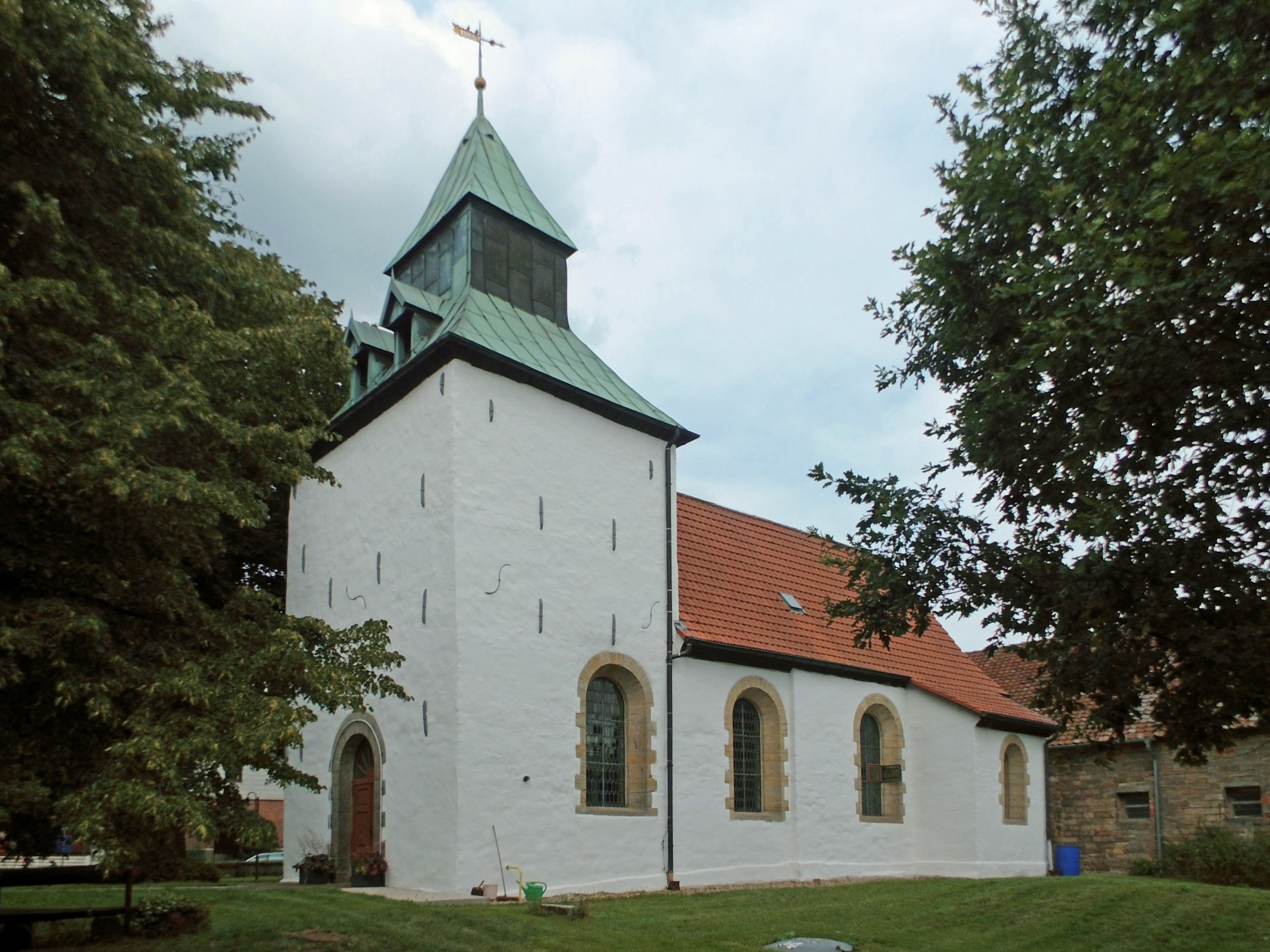
The Lutheran church in Rottorf am Klei
