= Helmstedt (district) =

District in Lower Saxony, Germany

Coordinates: 52°15′N 10°55′E

- District
- Flag Coat of arms
- Country: Germany
- State: Lower Saxony
- Capital: Helmstedt

Government
  - District admin.: Gerhard Radeck (CDU)

Area
  - Total: 674 km^{2} (260 sq mi)

Population (31 December 2022)
  - Total: 92,470
  - Density: 140/km^{2} (360/sq mi)
- Time zone: UTC+01:00 (CET)
  - Summer (DST): UTC+02:00 (CEST)
- Vehicle registration: HE
- Website: helmstedt.de

Helmstedt is a district in Lower Saxony, Germany. It is bounded by (from the west and clockwise) the district of Wolfenbüttel, the City of Braunschweig, the District of Gifhorn, the City of Wolfsburg and the State of Saxony-Anhalt (districts of Börde and Harz).

== Geography ==
The district is bounded by the Elm (a hill chain) in the west and the Lappwald (a riparian forest) in the east. Large parts of the district are part of the Elm-Lappwald Nature Park.

== History ==
In the Elm, limestone was mined in medieval times; limestone from the region was used for the tomb of Henry the Lion as well as for the imperial cathedral of Königslutter. In the Middle Ages, Königslutter was among the wealthiest cities of the Holy Roman Empire. In 1576, the University of Helmstedt was founded, which was the largest university of protestant Germany.

The Duchy of Brunswick (deriving from Brunswick-Lüneburg) created administrative districts (Kreise) in 1833; the District of Helmstedt was one of those districts. It was subdivided into the Ämter of Calvörde, Königslutter, Helmstedt, Schöningen, and Vorsfelde. In 1944, the Amt of Calvörde, which formed an exclave, was moved to the District of Haldensleben, Province of Saxony. During the administrative reforms of the 1970s, northern areas of the district were moved to the District of Gifhorn and to the City of Wolfsburg; the district gained areas in the west from the District of Gifhorn and the District of Brunswick (see List of territorial changes to the District of Helmstedt).

During the 20th century, the area between Helmstedt and Schöningen was used for lignite mining by the Braunschweigische Kohlenbergwerke AG. Several villages (Alversdorf, Büddenstedt and Runstedt) were destroyed by surface mining; their inhabitants moved to Helmstedt, Schöningen and to the newly built village of Neu Büddenstedt, later on renamed Büddenstedt.

== Coat of arms ==
In the upper part the heraldic horse of Lower Saxony is displayed. In the bottom there are symbols for mining and agriculture.

== Towns and municipalities ==
Clickable map of towns and municipalities in the district

| Towns | Samtgemeinden |
|---|---|---|
| 1. Helmstedt; 2. Königslutter; 3. Schöningen; Free municipalities: 1. Lehre | 1. Grasleben; 1. Grasleben^{1}; 2. Mariental; 3. Querenhorst; 4. Rennau; 2. Heeseberg; 1. Beierstedt; 2. Gevensleben; 3. Jerxheim^{1}; 4. Söllingen | 3. Nord-Elm; 1. Frellstedt; 2. Räbke; 3. Süpplingen^{1}; 4. Süpplingenburg; 5. Warberg; 6. Wolsdorf; 4. Velpke; 1. Bahrdorf; 2. Danndorf; 3. Grafhorst; 4. Groß Twülpstedt; 5. Velpke^{1} |
| | ^{1}seat of the Samtgemeinde |
