= Sudmerberg =

- Stadtteil of Goslar
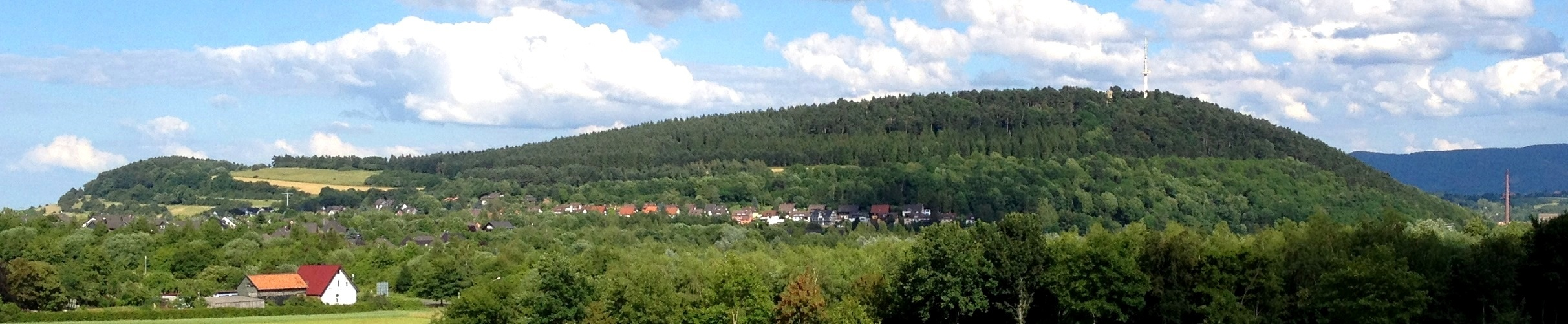
- The Sudmerberg hill and settlement
- Interactive map of Sudmerberg
- Location within Germany Location within Lower Saxony
- Coordinates: 51°54′58.6908″N 10°27′36.02″E
- Country: Germany
- State: Lower Saxony
- District: Goslar
- Town: Goslar
- Elevation: 235 m (771 ft)
- Time zone: UTC+01:00 (CET)
  - Summer (DST): UTC+02:00 (CEST)
- Postal codes: 38640
- Dialling codes: 05321
- Vehicle registration: GS

Sudmerberg is a quarter (Stadtteil) of Goslar in Lower Saxony, Germany, named after a prominent 354 m (1,161 ft)-metre-high hill to the east.

== Geography ==
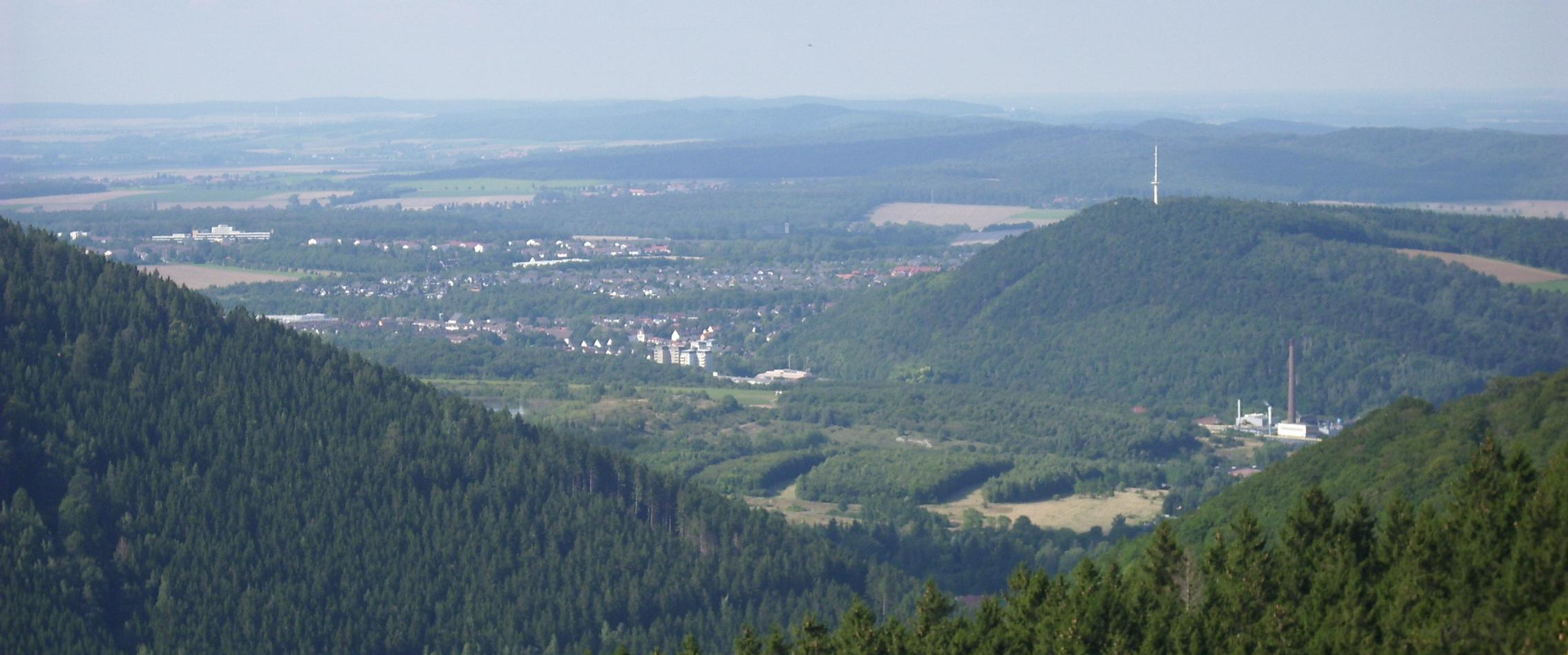
Sudmerberg, view from Harz mountains

The settlement is located between Goslar town centre and the Oker in the southeast. The Abzucht stream runs between the Sudmerberg hill, rising in the east, and the northern edge of the Harz mountains. The area is part of the Harz Nature Park. Sudmerberg currently has about 1,880 inhabitants.

The Vienenburg–Goslar railway follows the Abzucht river south of Sudmerberg. To the north, the Bundesstraße 6 federal highway runs to the neighbouring town of Bad Harzburg.

== History ==
An early medieval lowland castle, located at the confluence of the Abzucht and the Oker, was first mentioned as Sudburg in a 1064 deed issued by King Henry IV of Germany. Probably affiliated with the nearby royal palace of Werla, it lent its name to the adjacent Sudmerberg hill. Today, only the foundations remain of the fortress which fell into ruins in the 14th century.

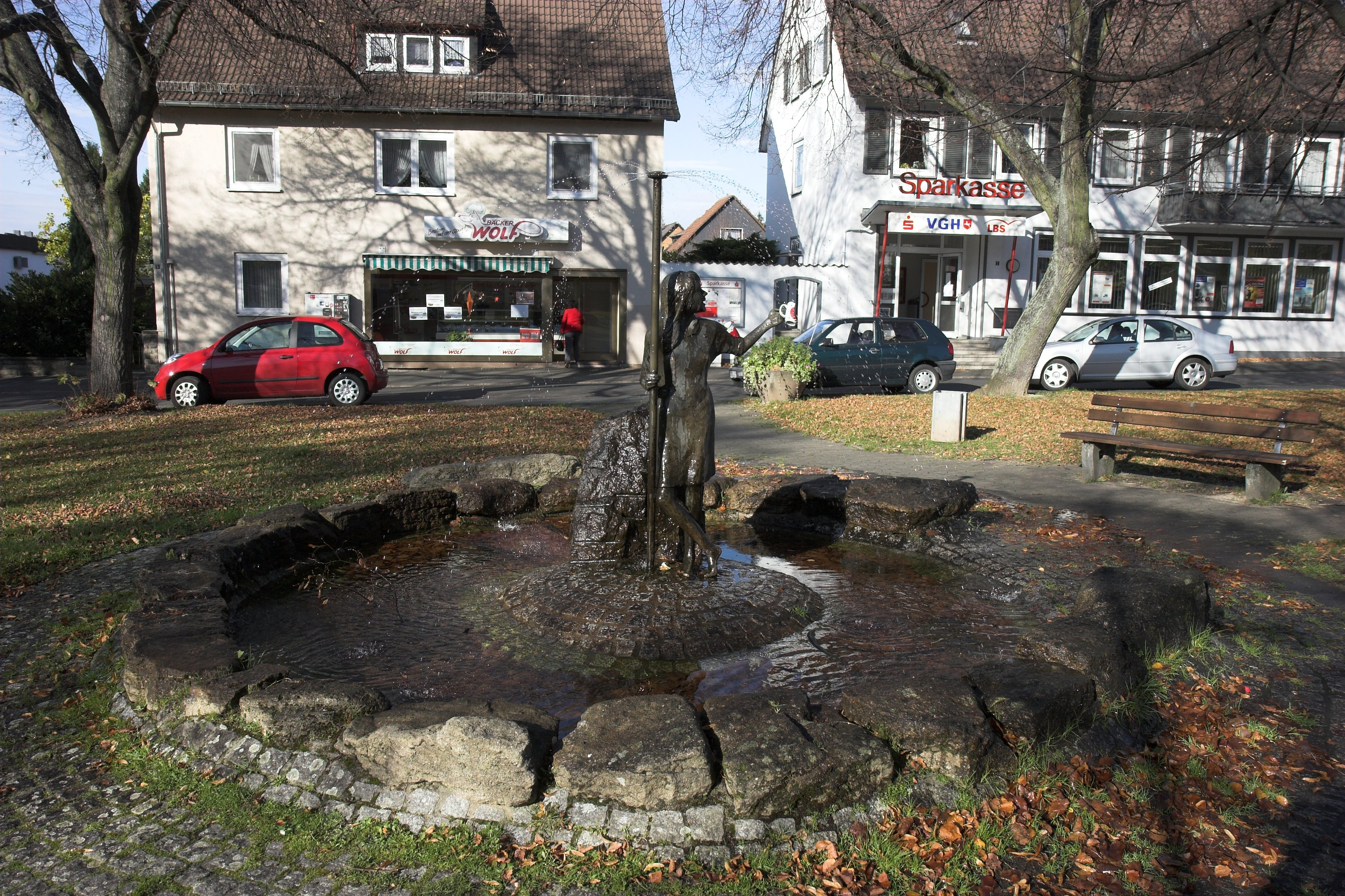
Wellspring and Girl with the umbrella

In April 1935, Goslar's town council issued a development plan for the Sudmerberg settlement, mainly for employees of the nearby Rammelsberg ore mine (Preussag) and the Oker ironworks. As early as December 1936, the first settlers moved into their new houses, further dwellings were occupied the next year. Though construction works ceased during World War II, from 1948 onwards numerous refugee families found homes in Sudmerberg. In expectation of an increase in the permanent population, Sudmerberg Primary School was built, opening in 1950.

Until about 1960 there was an open-cast mine on the Sudmerberg hill in a small sandstone quarry.

== Points of interest ==
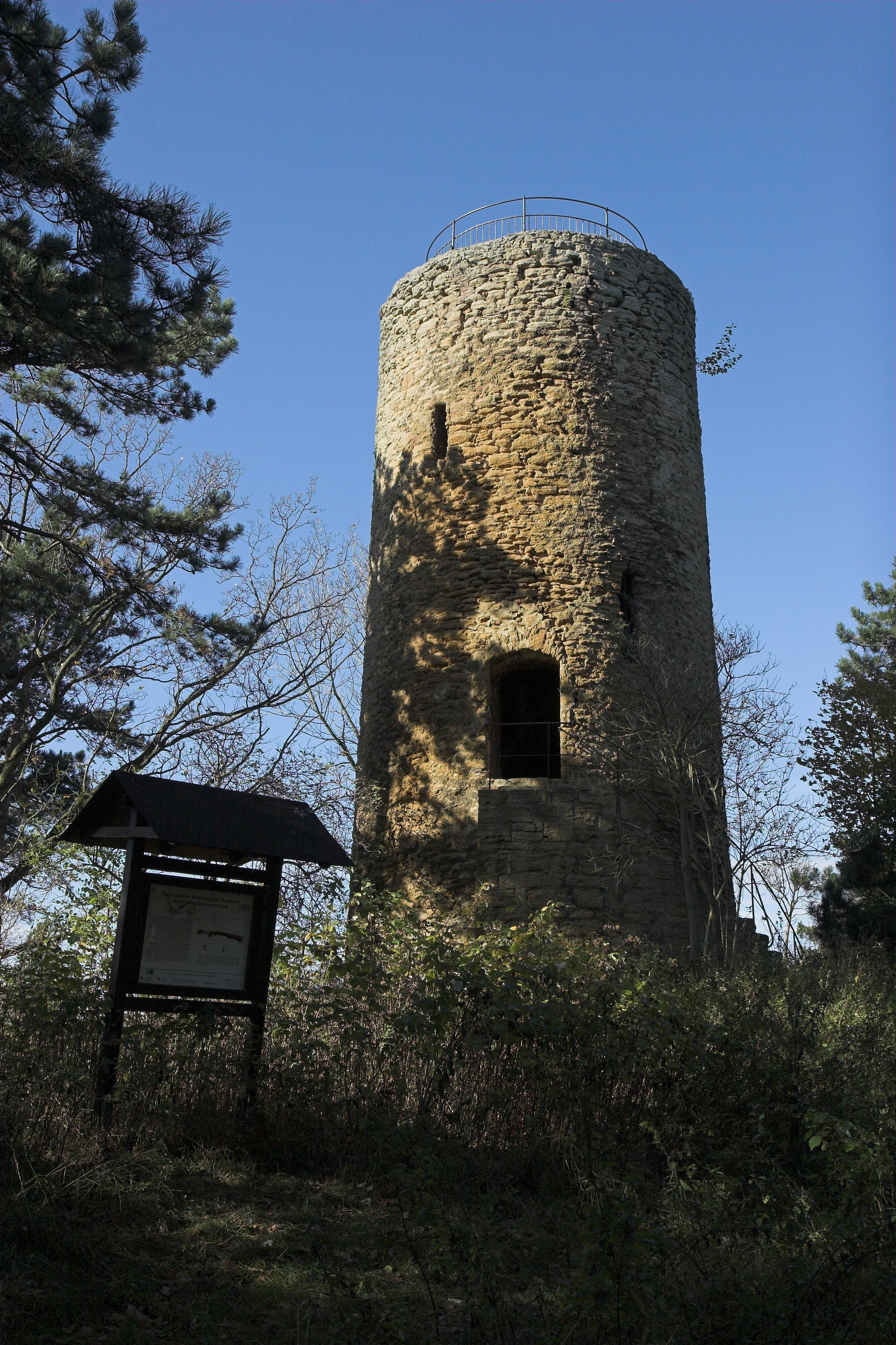
Sudmerberg tower

- A wellspring in the central market square contains a lump of ore from the Rammelsberg mine. The sculpture called Girl with the Umbrella (Mädchen mit dem Wasserschirm) was created by artist, Anna Barth from Sankt Andreasberg.
- From the summit of the Sudmerberg, a medieval watchtower, the Sudmerberger Warte, erected by the imperial city of Goslar, offers scenic views of the entire town of Goslar, the northern Harz foothills and the highest mountain in the Harz, the Brocken massif.

== Clubs and events ==
The Fanfarenzug Goslar Sudmerberg, now Powerbrass Goslar, was founded in 1965.
