= Oker (Goslar) =

- Stadtteil of Goslar
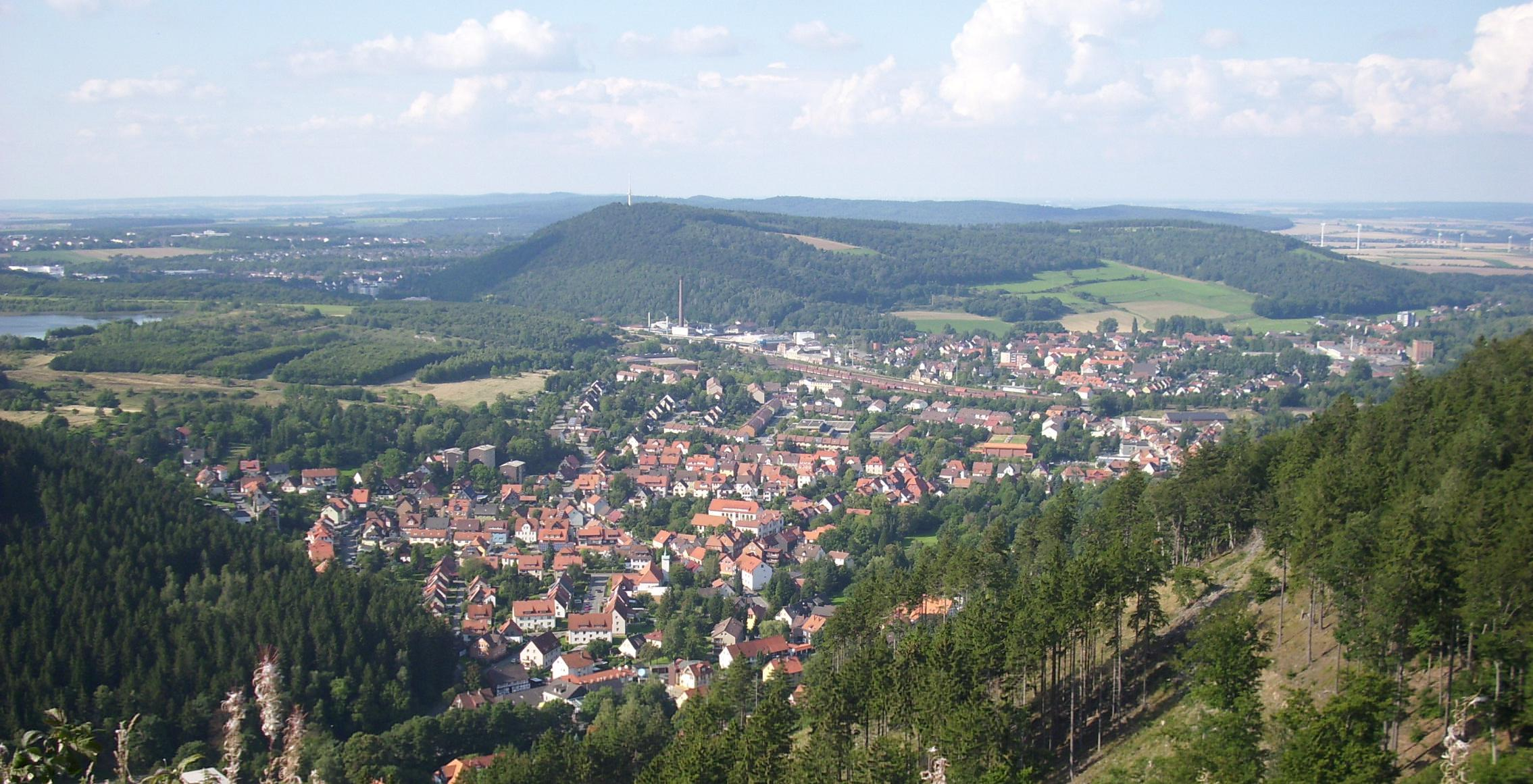
- View over Oker and Sudmerberg from the Harz mountains

- Coat of arms
- Interactive map of Oker
- Location within Germany Location within Lower Saxony
- Coordinates: 51°54′11″N 10°29′17″E
- Country: Germany
- State: Lower Saxony
- District: Goslar
- Town: Goslar
- Elevation: 208 m (682 ft)

Population (2014-12-31)
  - Total: 5,599
- Time zone: UTC+01:00 (CET)
  - Summer (DST): UTC+02:00 (CEST)
- Postal codes: 38640, 38642, 38644
- Dialling codes: 05324
- Vehicle registration: GS

Oker (German pronunciation: [ˈoːkɐ]) is a borough (Stadtteil) of Goslar in Lower Saxony, Germany. Since 1952 a mining town in its own right within Wolfenbüttel district, it was incorporated into the Goslar municipality on 1 July 1972.

== Geography ==
The settlement is situated on the northern edge of the Harz mountain range. The river Oker gives its name to the location, where the stream together with its Abzucht tributary leads out of the Oker valley between the Hahnenberg and Adenberg mountains in the south and the Sudmerberg hill in the north. Oker is divided into two unofficial districts: Oberoker (Upper Oker) south of the Vienenburg–Goslar railway line (and nearer to the Harz range), and Unteroker (Lower Oker) north of it.

== History ==
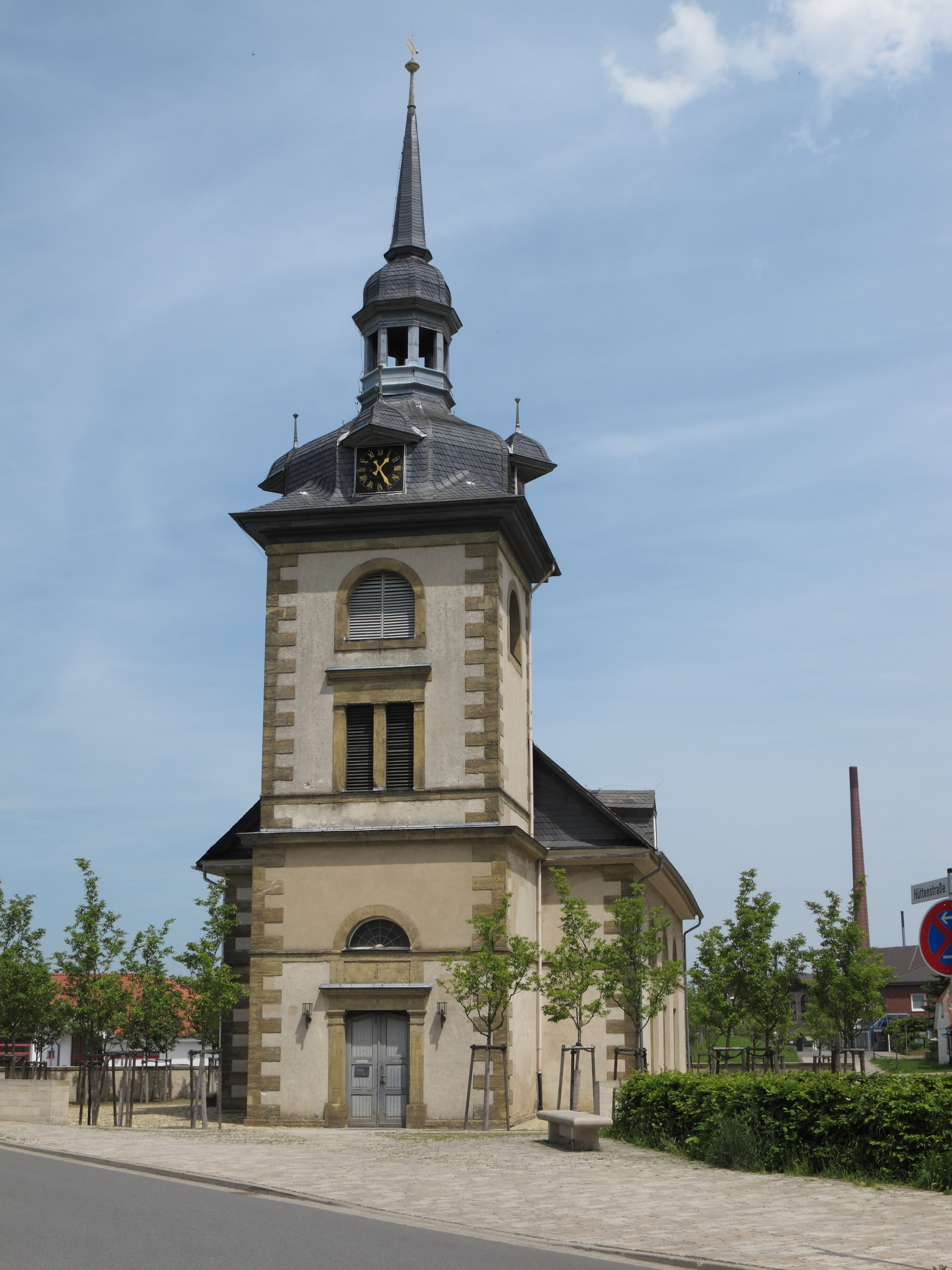
Martin Luther Church

Founded in 1527 by the Wolfenbüttel duke Henry V of Brunswick-Lüneburg as a smelting site for the processing of ore from the Rammelsberg mines, Oker for centuries was a centre of smelting technology in the Harz region. The Oker lead and copper works (Bleihütte Oker) operated from 1527 to 1970; lead was melted from secondary raw materials by a successor company until 2001. Together with the neighbouring zinc oxide works (Zinkoxydhütte Oker) and the zinc works in Harlingerode, it was gradually taken over by the Preussag conglomerate (present-day TUI) from 1923.

On 1 April 1819 an agency of the Brunswick Postal Service was opened on the old mail route from Wolfenbüttel to Harzburg (Neustadt). It was moved to the railway station on the opening of the Vienenburg–Goslar railway on 23 March 1866.

== Economy ==
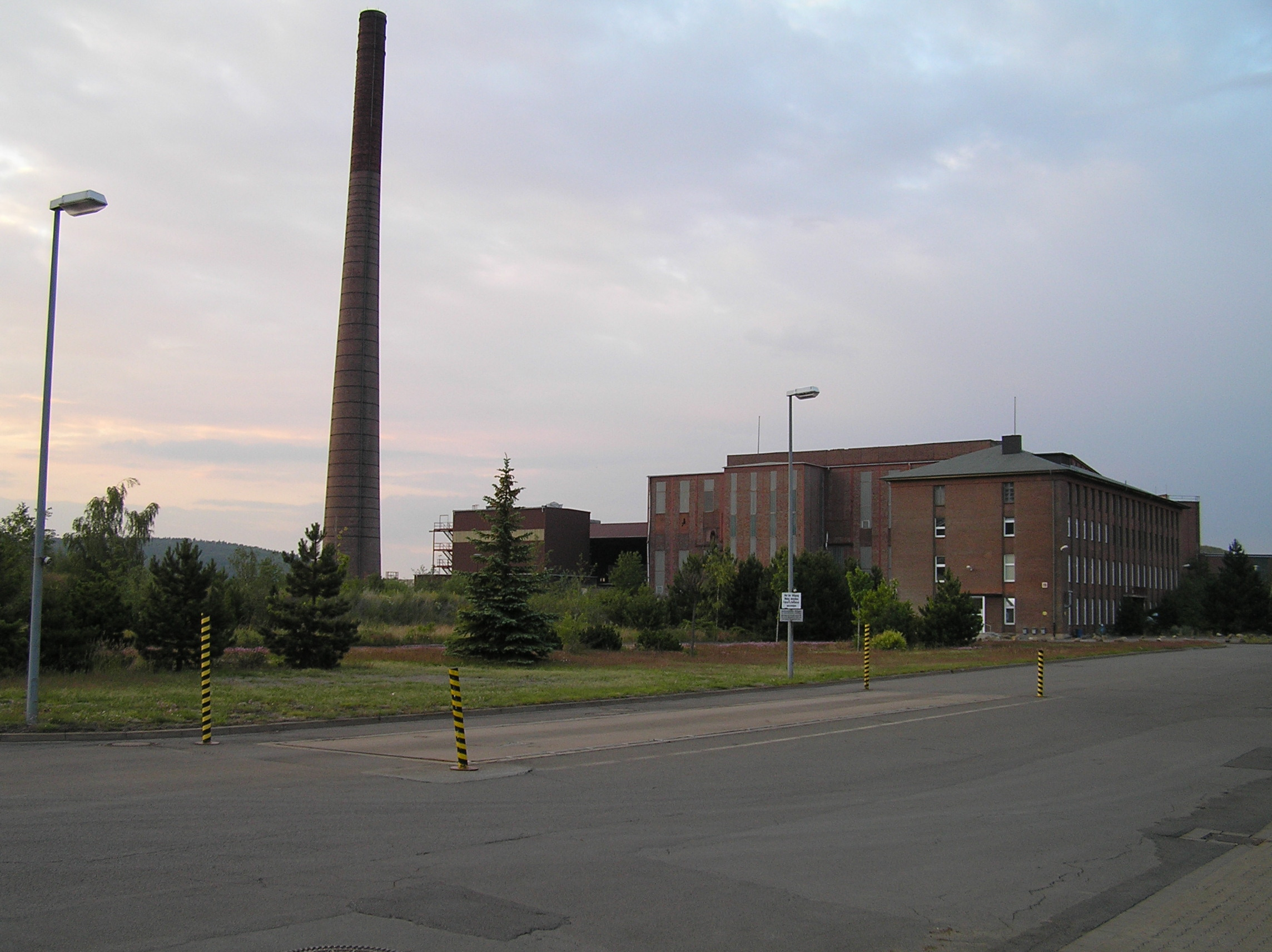
Former Oker smelting works, 2004 condition

Today Oker is home to chemical-metallurgical, recycling and specialised industrial concerns, like Harz-Metall and Norzinco. The largest employer in Oker and the district of Goslar is a factory belonging to H.C. Starck company, a former daughter of Bayer sold to Advent International and The Carlyle Group in 2007.

== Religion ==
The two Evangelical-Lutheran parishes of St. Paul (Unteroker) and Martin Luther (Oberoker) merged in October 2005 into the Oker parish; there is also the Roman-Catholic church of St. Konrad (part of the parish of St. Jacobus d.Ä. in Goslar) and a Turkish Muslim parish (Oberoker).

== Culture and places of interest ==
=== Sport ===
The hiking trail network around Oker is well developed, with paths leading to popular destinations such as Romkerhall on the Oker river, and the tors of Treppenstein, Mausefall and Kästeklippen above the Oker valley. In the village itself there are 2 sports halls, sports pitches and tennis courts and an open-air swimming pool.

The largest sports club is VfL Oker, which is especially renowned for its pan-regional table tennis team. The 1st Men's team plays in the Oberliga West and the 1st Women's team in the Regionalliga Nord.

== Economy and infrastructure ==
=== Transport ===
Oker station lies on the railway lines running from Hanover via Hildesheim to Bad Harzburg (Oker–Bad Harzburg railway, KBS 320) and from Brunswick via Goslar/Bad Harzburg to Kreiensen (Vienenburg–Goslar railway, KBS 353/354), with hourly and two-hourly services. Bus routes link Oker with Goslar and Bad Harzburg. The Bundesstraße 498 (Goslar–Osterode am Harz) runs through Oker and the Bundesstraße 6 (Cuxhaven–Görlitz) runs past Oker to the north.

For the development of postal services in Oker see: Wolfenbüttel-Harzburg post route.

=== Public institutions ===
There are three kindergartens, two primary schools, a secondary modern and a middle school in Oker.
