= Gelmke =

Stream in Germany

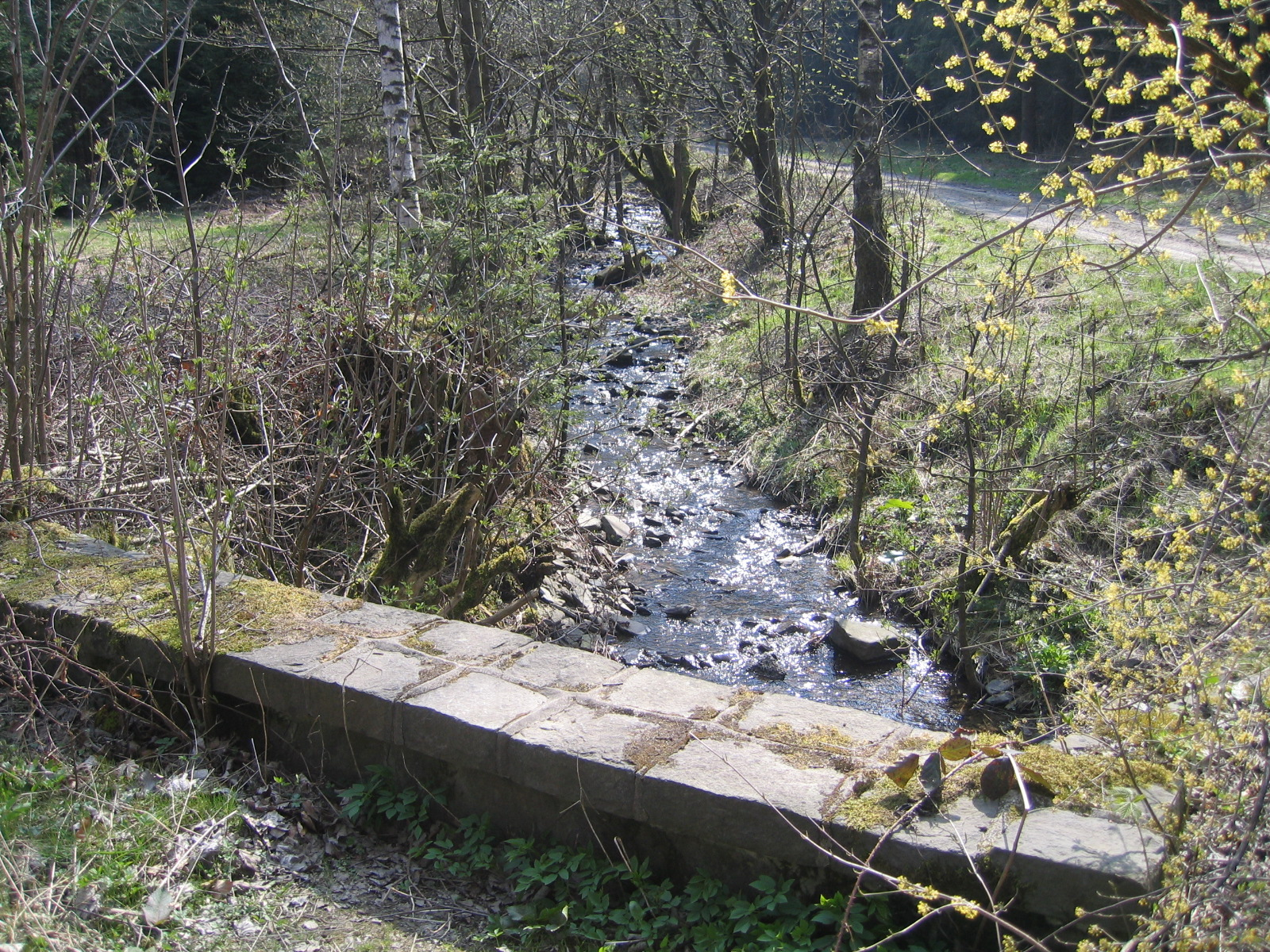
- The Gelmke just upstream of the E 11 trail

Location
- Country: Germany
- State: Lower Saxony
- Reference no.: DE: 48214

Physical characteristics
- Source
  - location: 1.45 km (0.90 mi) ENE of the Dicker Kopf in the Harz
  - elevation: ca. 510 m above sea level (NN)
- Mouth
  - location: near Oker (Goslar) into the Abzucht
  - coordinates: 51.910°N 10.476°E
- Length: ca. 6 km (3.7 mi)
- Basin size: 4.6 km^{2} (1.8 sq mi)

Basin features
- Progression: Abzucht→ Oker→ Aller→ Weser→ North Sea
- Tributaries
  - right: unnamed stream on the Brautstein

The Gelmke is a small stream, roughly 6 kilometres (3.7 mi) long, and right-hand tributary of the Abzucht in Lower Saxony, Germany. The stream flows through part of the town of Goslar.

== Geography ==
The Gelmke rises in the Gelmke Valley (Gelmketal) at about 610 m above sea level (NN). Its source lies east-northeast of the hill known as the Dicker Kopf (668 m) and north of the Eichenberg (670 m). It flows initially northwards through a densely wooded valley, where it is crossed by the E 11 European long-distance trail before emerging into open fields and swinging east, just above the old Goslar sewage ponds. It then heads north again to join the Abzucht near Goslar station.

== See also ==
- List of rivers of Lower Saxony
