= Gose (river) =

River in Germany

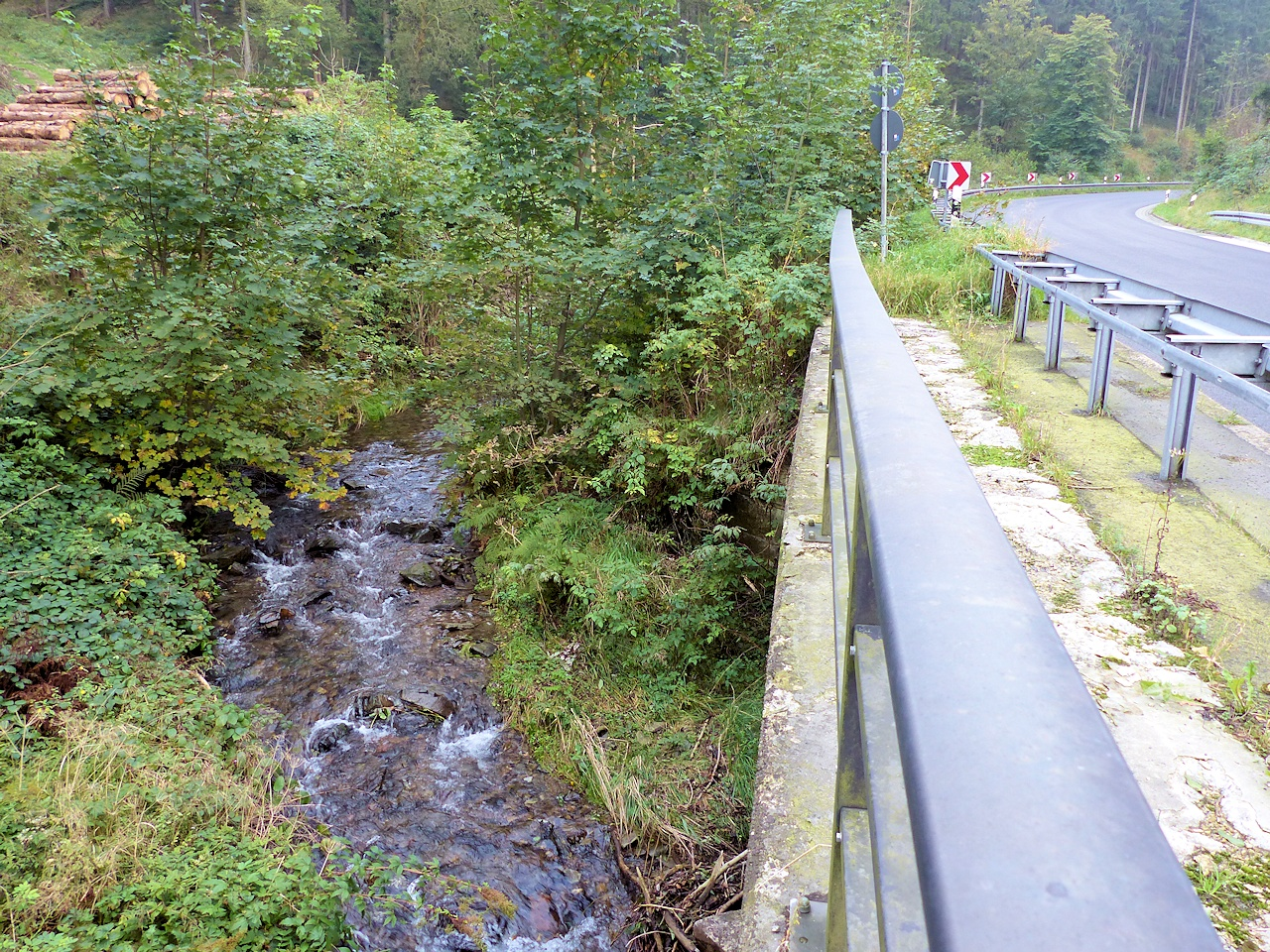
- Gose along the B 241 south-west of Goslar centre

Location
- Country: Germany

Physical characteristics
- Source
  - location: Harz mountains
  - coordinates: 51.8578°N 10.3644°E
  - elevation: 615 meters (2,018 ft)
- Mouth
  - location: Abzucht
  - coordinates: 51.8994°N 10.4154°E
- Length: 7.1 km (4.4 mi)
- Basin size: 10 km^{2} (3.9 sq mi)

Basin features
- Progression: Abzucht→ Oker→ Aller→ Weser→ North Sea

The Gose is a small river in Lower Saxony, Germany. It is a left tributary of the Abzucht. The river is 7.1 kilometres (4.4 mi) long with a drainage basin of 10 km^{2} (3.9 sq mi). Its source lies north of Auerhahn in the Harz Mountains, on the eastern slopes of Bocksberg. The river runs towards the northeast through a steep and narrow valley and meets the Abzucht on the western edge of Goslar, which is named after the river. Its water was once used in the brewing of the traditional Gose beer.

== See also ==
- List of rivers of Lower Saxony
