= Altenau (Oker) =

River in Lower Saxony, Germany

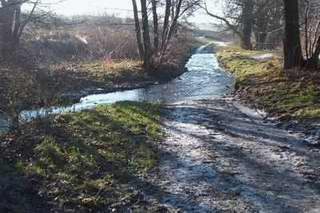
- Altenau ford near Küblingen

- Location of mouth in Lower Saxony

Location
- Country: Germany
- State: Lower Saxony
- Reference no.: DE: 4826

Physical characteristics
- Source
  - location: northeast of Eitzum in the Elm
  - coordinates: 52°10′08″N 10°51′17″E
  - elevation: about 206 m
- Mouth
  - location: Oker near Wolfenbüttel
  - coordinates: 52°08′10″N 10°33′24″E
  - elevation: 77 m
- Length: 25.0 km (15.5 mi)
- Basin size: 140 km^{2} (54 sq mi)

Basin features
- Progression: Oker→ Aller→ Weser→ North Sea
- Landmarks: Small towns: Schöppenstedt
- Tributaries
  - left: Rothebach
  - right: Sauerbach, Hachumerbach, Glue Riede

The Altenau (German pronunciation: [ˈaltənaʊ]) is a small river of Lower Saxony, Germany. It rises in the Elm, northeast of Eitzum, a district of Schöppenstedt, and discharges from the right into the Oker near Halchter, a district of Wolfenbüttel.

== Altenau valley ==
Between the heights of the Asse and the Heeseberg in the south and the Elm ridge in the north stretches an almost treeless arable plain, the roughly 25 kilometre long Schöppenstedt Depression (Schöppenstedter Mulde). Here the Altenau flows in an east-west direction in a meadow valley about 500 metres wide. The source of the river lies immediately west of the watershed between the rivers Weser and Elbe. In the southern part of the depression the Altenau picks up a succession of small streams from the slopes of the Elm as it cuts through the hollow as a regulated and relatively straight stream.

== See also ==
- List of rivers of Lower Saxony
