= Ohebach =

Ohebach may refer to:

- Ohebach (Kehrenbach), a river of Hesse, Germany, tributary of the Kehrenbach
- Ohebach (Efze), a river of Hesse, Germany, tributary of the Efze
- Ohebach (Oker), a river of Lower Saxony, Germany, tributary of the Oker
