= Jerxheim =

- Municipality
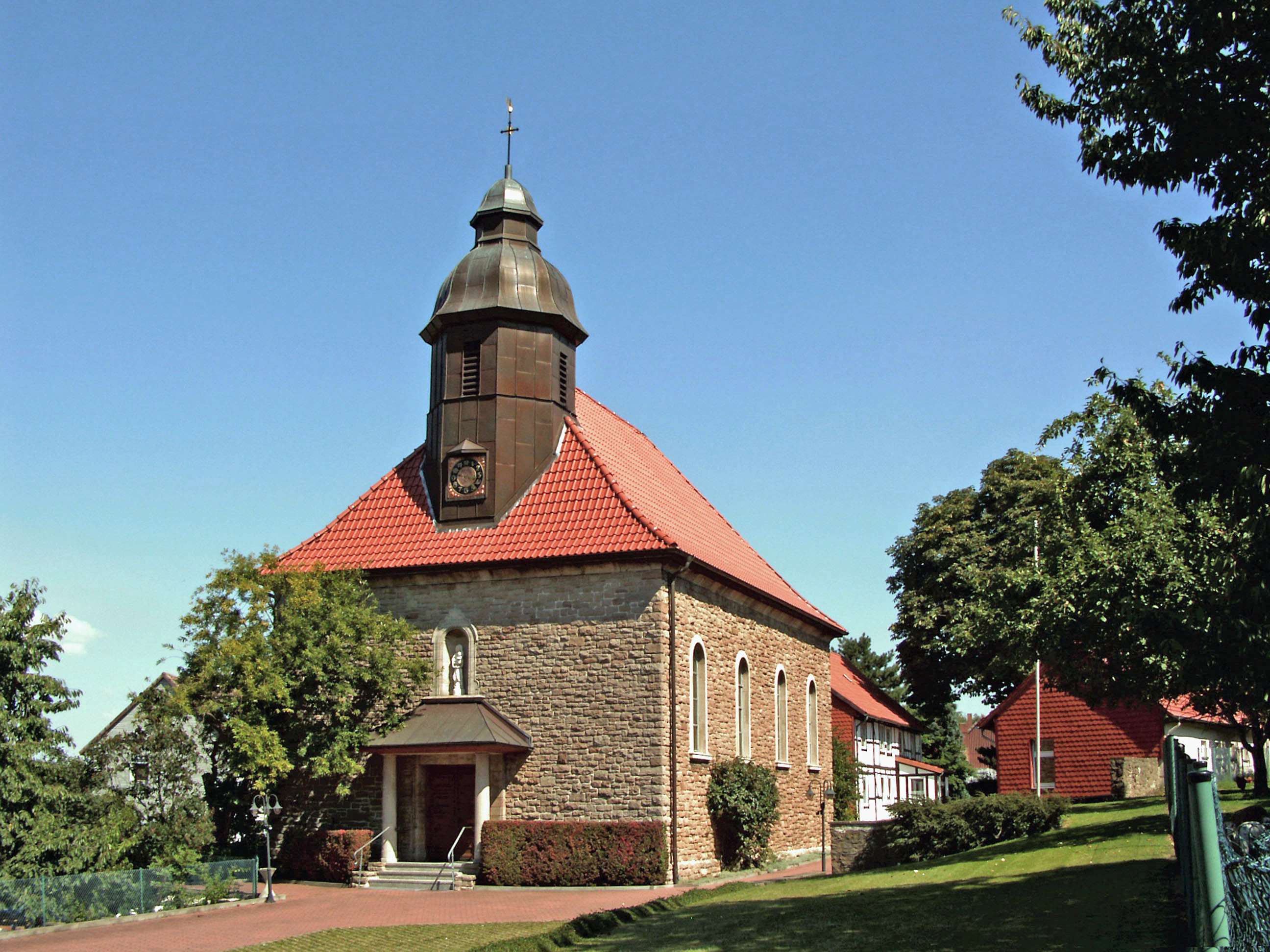
- The Catholic church

- Coat of arms

- Location of Jerxheim within Helmstedt district
- Interactive map of Jerxheim
- Location within Germany Location within Lower Saxony
- Coordinates: 52°5′2″N 10°54′0″E
- Country: Germany
- State: Lower Saxony
- District: Helmstedt
- Municipal assoc.: Heeseberg
- Subdivisions: 2

Government
  - Mayor: Wolfgang Sander

Area
  - Total: 17.51 km^{2} (6.76 sq mi)
- Elevation: 103 m (338 ft)

Population (2025-12-31)
  - Total: 1,024
  - Density: 58.48/km^{2} (151.5/sq mi)
- Time zone: UTC+01:00 (CET)
  - Summer (DST): UTC+02:00 (CEST)
- Postal codes: 38381
- Dialling codes: 05354
- Vehicle registration: HE
- Website: www.samtgemeinde-heeseberg.de

Jerxheim (German pronunciation: [ˈjɛʁksˌhaɪm]) is a municipality in the district of Helmstedt, in Lower Saxony, Germany.

== Personalities ==
- Kurt Meyer Knights Cross holder, SS General, convicted war criminal

== Gallery ==
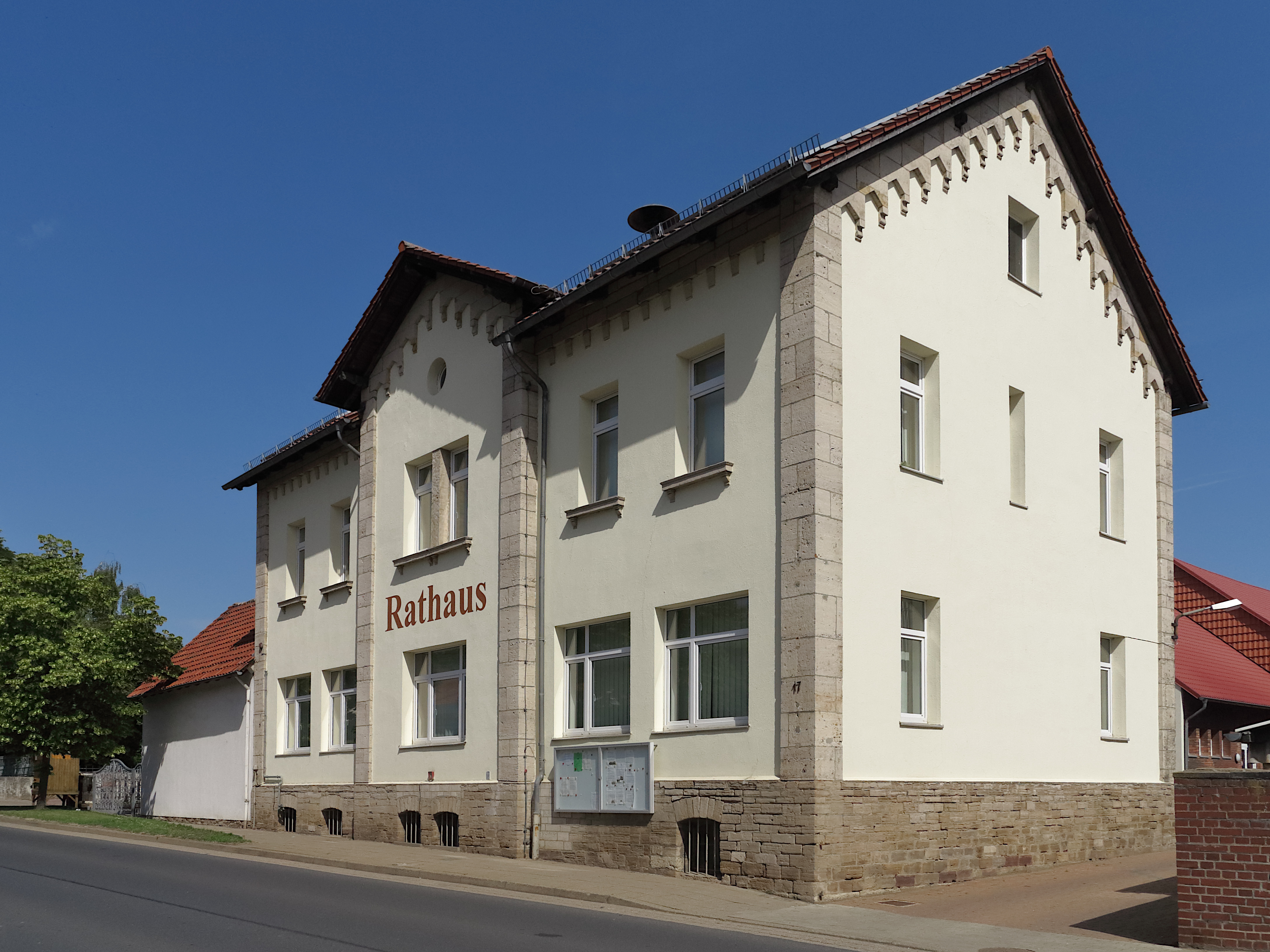
The town hall

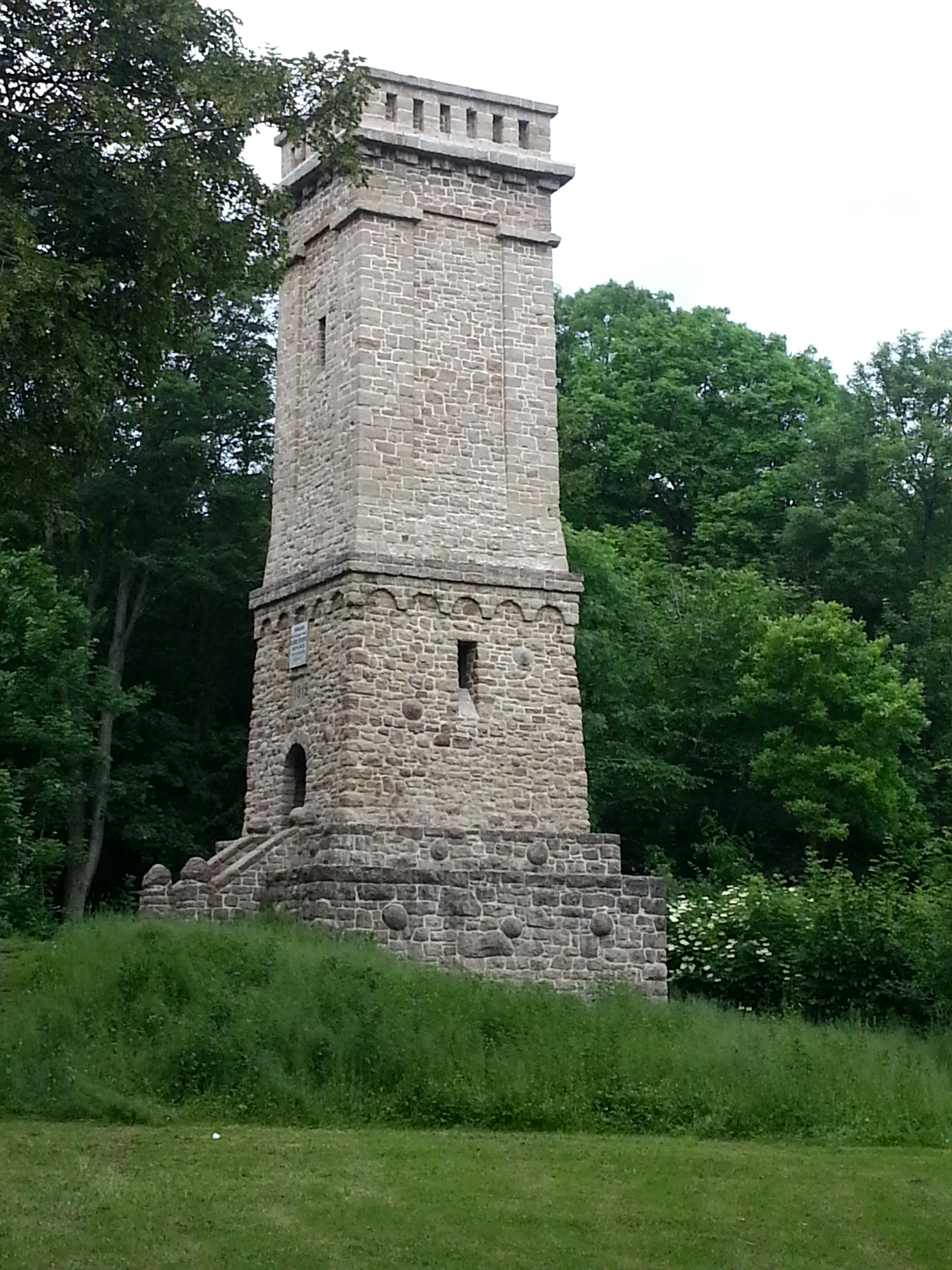
The observation tower
