= Beierstedt =

- Municipality
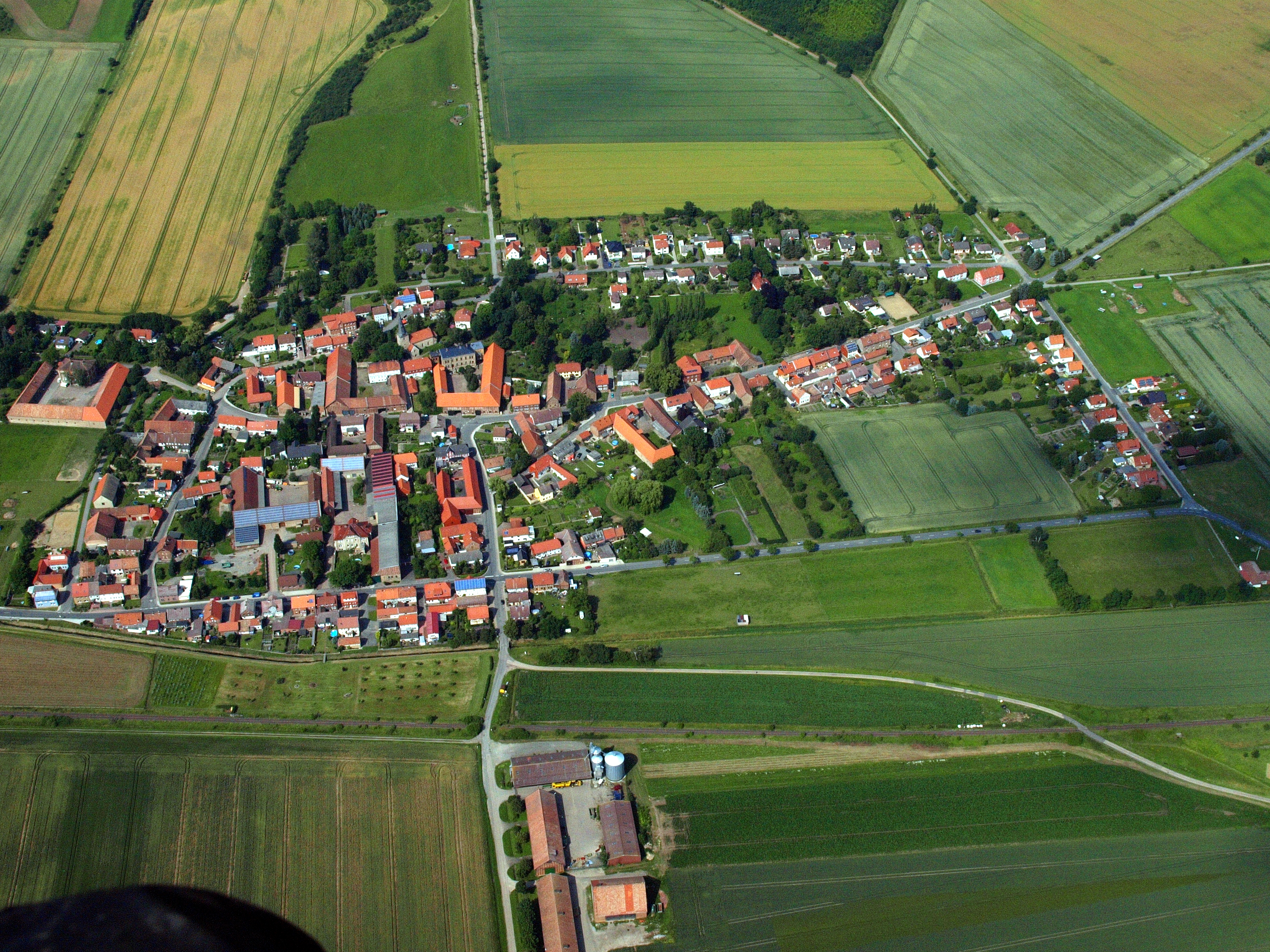

- Coat of arms

- Location of Beierstedt within Helmstedt district
- Interactive map of Beierstedt
- Location within Germany Location within Lower Saxony
- Coordinates: 52°05′N 10°52′E
- Country: Germany
- State: Lower Saxony
- District: Helmstedt
- Municipal assoc.: Heeseberg

Government
  - Mayor: Brigitte Stolte (SPD)

Area
  - Total: 9.59 km^{2} (3.70 sq mi)
- Elevation: 133 m (436 ft)

Population (2025-12-31)
  - Total: 360
  - Density: 38/km^{2} (97/sq mi)
- Time zone: UTC+01:00 (CET)
  - Summer (DST): UTC+02:00 (CEST)
- Postal codes: 38382
- Dialling codes: 05354
- Vehicle registration: HE
- Website: www.samtgemeinde-heeseberg.de

Beierstedt is a municipality in the district of Helmstedt, in Lower Saxony, Germany.
