= Gevensleben =

- Municipality
- Coat of arms

- Location of Gevensleben within Helmstedt district
- Interactive map of Gevensleben
- Location within Germany Location within Lower Saxony
- Coordinates: 52°04′N 10°50′E
- Country: Germany
- State: Lower Saxony
- District: Helmstedt
- Municipal assoc.: Heeseberg
- Subdivisions: 2

Government
  - Mayor: Hans-Georg Fenski

Area
  - Total: 15.14 km^{2} (5.85 sq mi)
- Elevation: 88 m (289 ft)

Population (2025-12-31)
  - Total: 596
  - Density: 39.4/km^{2} (102/sq mi)
- Time zone: UTC+01:00 (CET)
  - Summer (DST): UTC+02:00 (CEST)
- Postal codes: 38384
- Dialling codes: 05354
- Vehicle registration: HE
- Website: www.samtgemeinde-heeseberg.de

Gevensleben is a municipality in the district of Helmstedt, in Lower Saxony, Germany. The Municipality Gevensleben includes the villages of Gevensleben and Watenstedt.

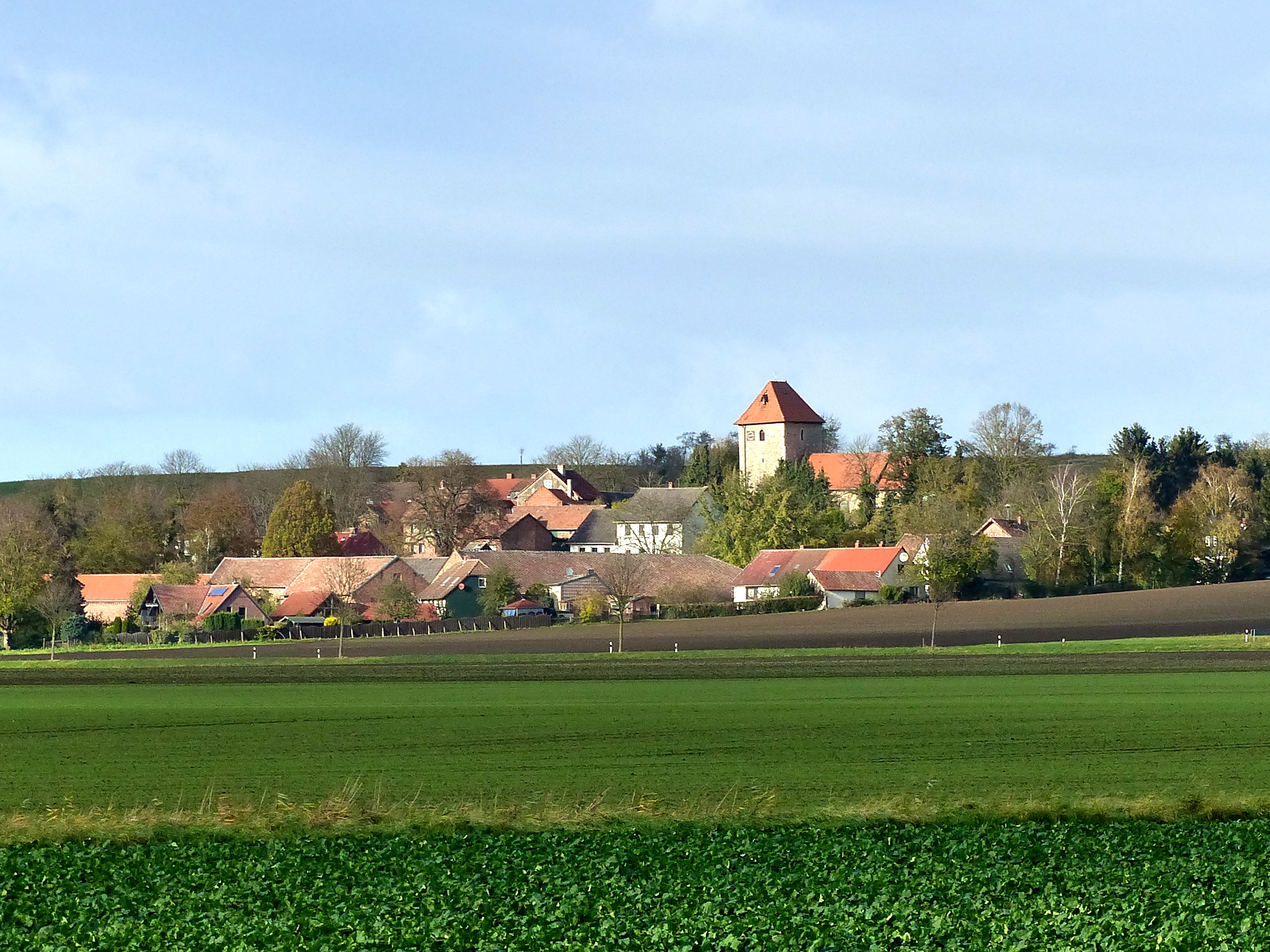
Watenstedt
