= Bickgraben =

River in Germany

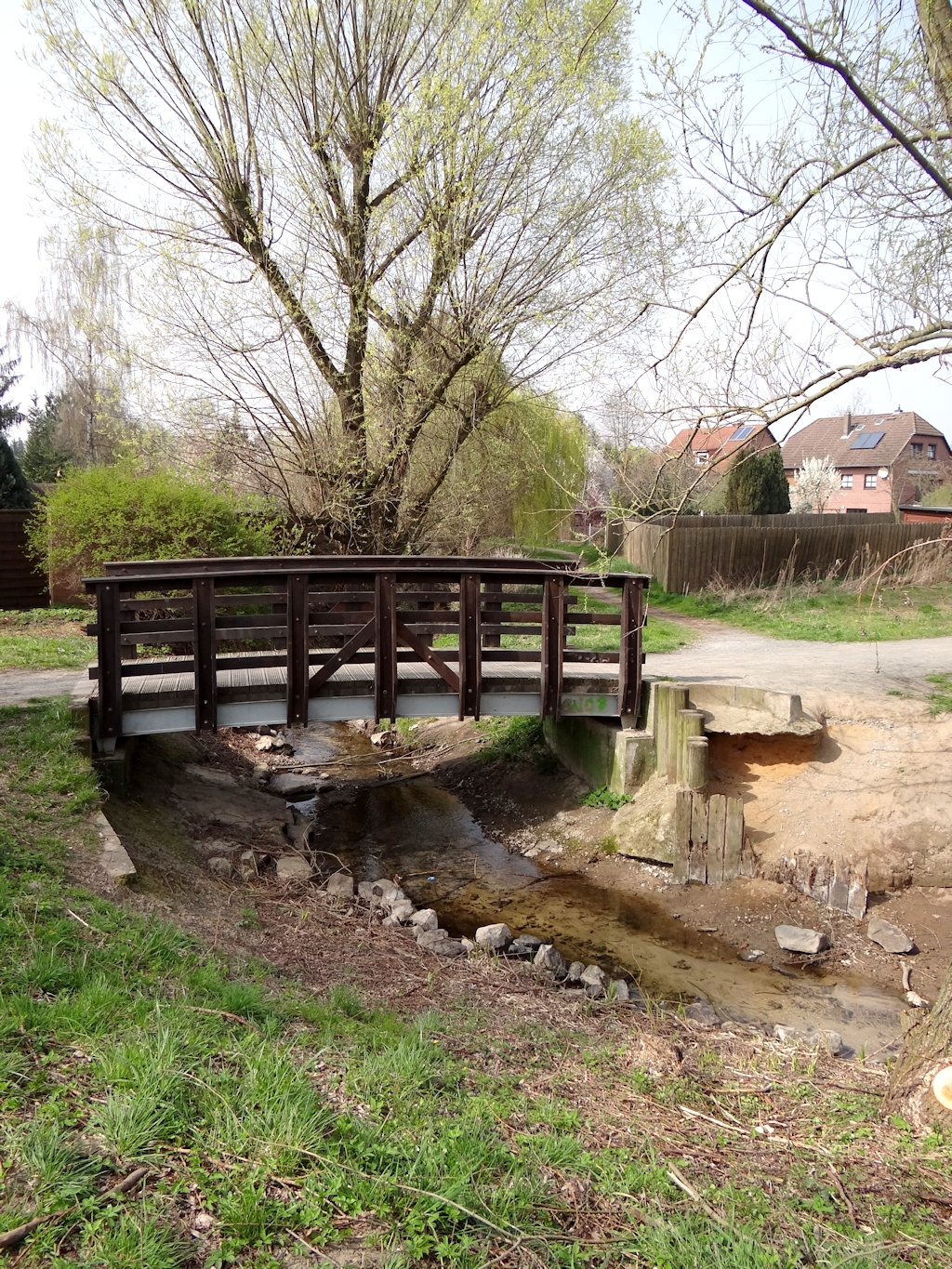

Location
- Country: Germany
- State: Lower Saxony

Physical characteristics
- Mouth
  - location: Oker
  - coordinates: 52.3511°N 10.4308°E

Basin features
- Progression: Oker→ Aller→ Weser→ North Sea

Bickgraben is a small river of Lower Saxony, Germany. It flows into the Oker in Schwülper.

== See also ==
- List of rivers of Lower Saxony
