= Vienenburg–Goslar railway =

Railway line in Germany

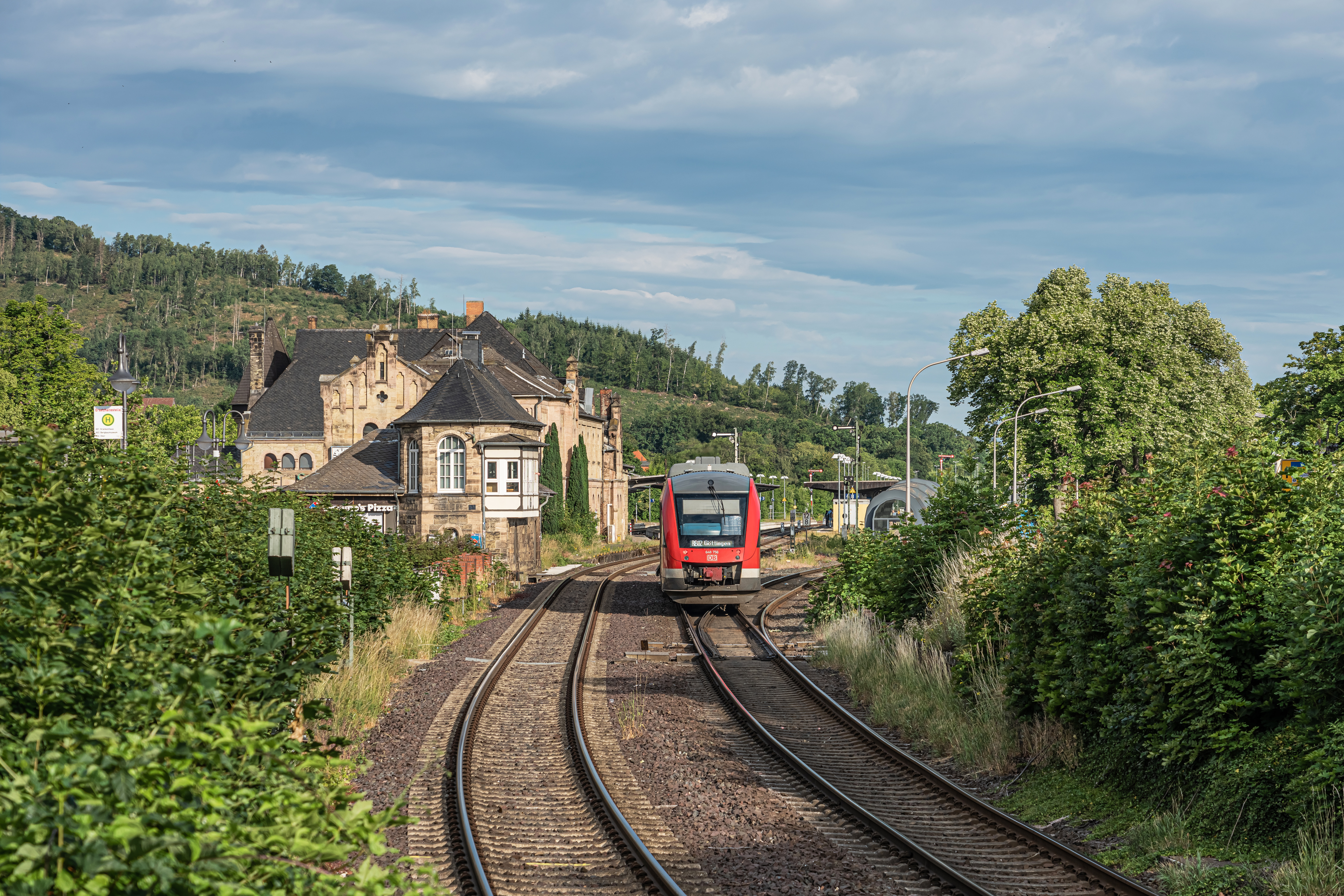

Overview
- Line number: 1932
- Locale: Lower Saxony, Germany

Service
- Route number: 330, 353

Technical
- Line length: 12.8 km (8.0 mi)
- Number of tracks: 2: Oker–Goslar
- Track gauge: 1,435 mm (4 ft 8 1/2 in) standard gauge

The Vienenburg–Goslar railway is a main line between Vienenburg and Goslar on the northern edge of the Harz mountains in Germany. It was opened in 1866.

== Route ==
The 12.8 kilometre long route is single-tracked between Vienenburg and Oker. For much of its way the line follows the river Oker. The section from Oker to Goslar has been doubled.

== Operations ==
The line is worked by regional trains on the Goslar–Vienenburg–Brunswick route. On the Goslar–Oker section there trains also run from Hanover and Kreiensen to Bad Harzburg.
