= Heeseberg =

- Samtgemeinde
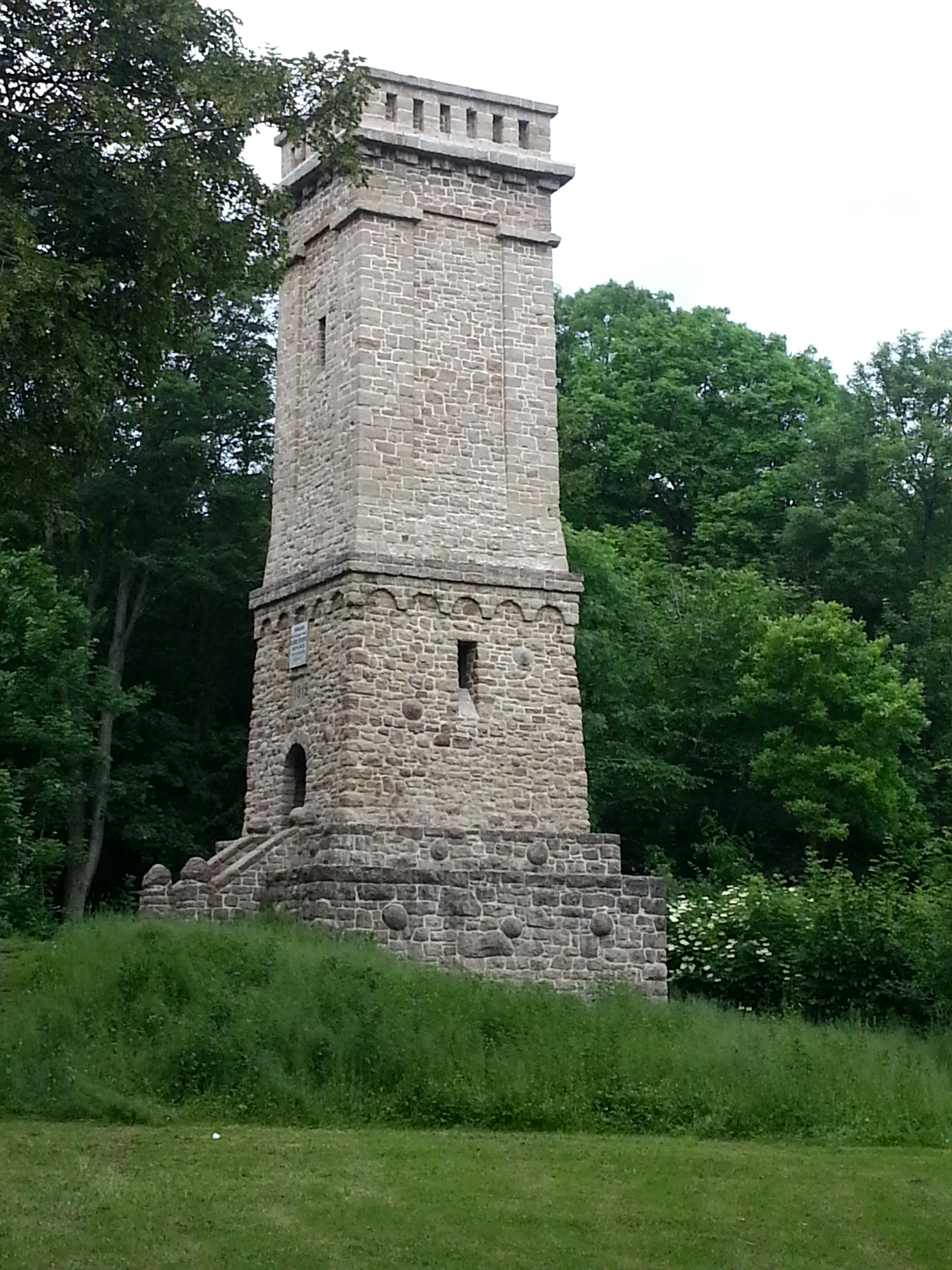
- The observation tower on the Heeseberg

- Coat of arms

- Location of Heeseberg within Helmstedt district
- Interactive map of Heeseberg
- Location within Germany Location within Lower Saxony
- Coordinates: 52°05′N 10°54′E
- Country: Germany
- State: Lower Saxony
- District: Helmstedt
- Seat: Jerxheim
- Subdivisions: 4 municipalities

Area
  - Total: 81.85 km^{2} (31.60 sq mi)

Population (2025-12-31)
  - Total: 3,451
  - Density: 42.16/km^{2} (109.2/sq mi)
- Time zone: UTC+01:00 (CET)
  - Summer (DST): UTC+02:00 (CEST)
- Website: samtgemeindeheeseberg.de

Heeseberg is a Samtgemeinde ("collective municipality") in the district of Helmstedt, in Lower Saxony, Germany. It is situated approximately 20 km from southwest of Helmstedt, and 35 km from southeast of Braunschweig. Its seat is in the village Jerxheim.

The Samtgemeinde Heeseberg consists of the following municipalities:

1. Beierstedt
2. Gevensleben
3. Jerxheim
4. Söllingen
