= Ohebach (Oker) =

River in Germany

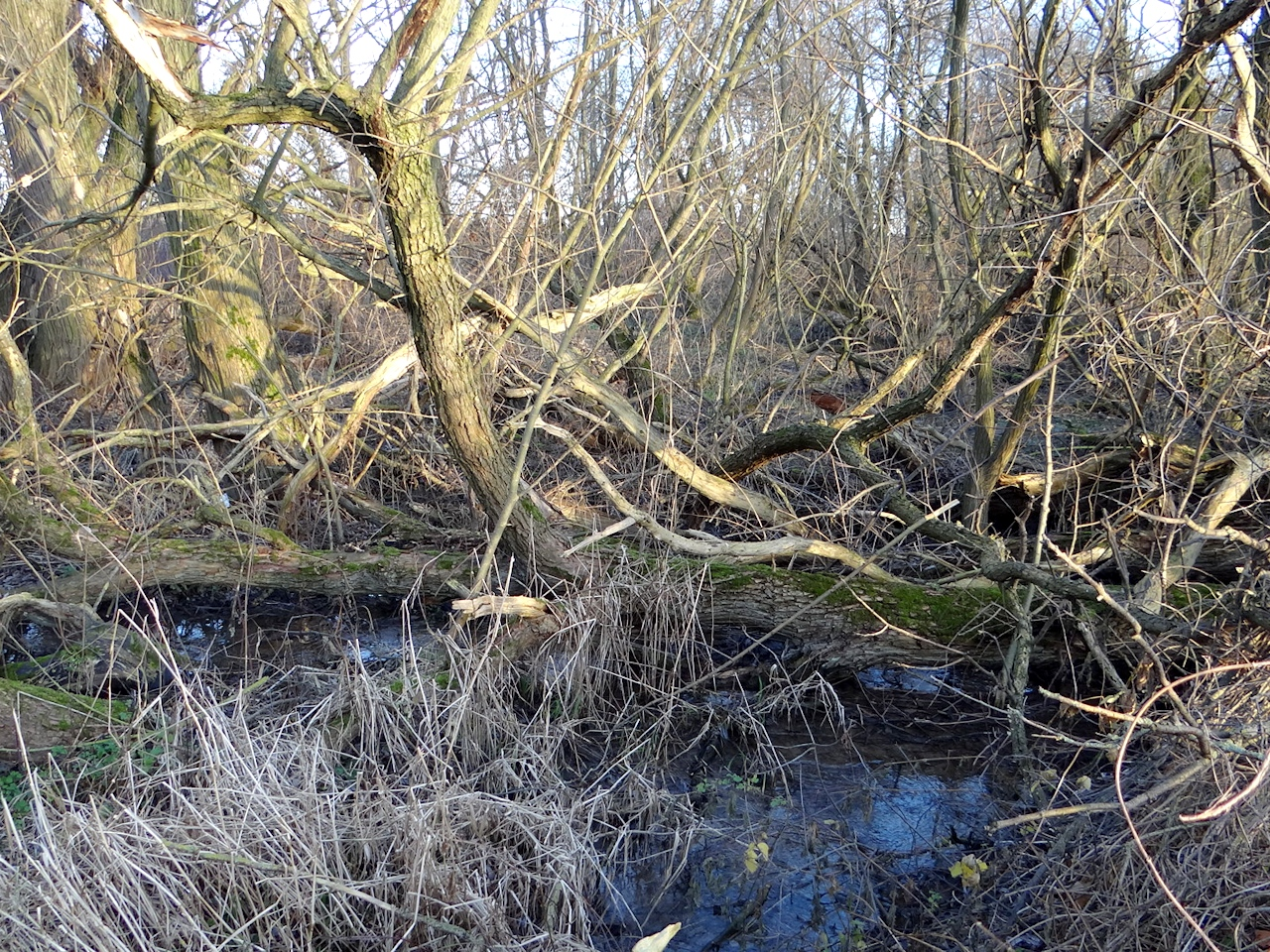

Location
- Country: Germany
- State: Lower Saxony

Physical characteristics
- Source
  - location: Harlyberg
  - coordinates: 51.9734°N 10.5339°E
- Mouth
  - location: near Lengde, a district of Goslar
  - coordinates: 52.0021°N 10.5577°E

Basin features
- Progression: Oker→ Aller→ Weser→ North Sea

Ohebach is a river of Lower Saxony, Germany. It is a left tributary of the Oker.

== See also ==
- List of rivers of Lower Saxony
