= Abzucht =

River in Germany

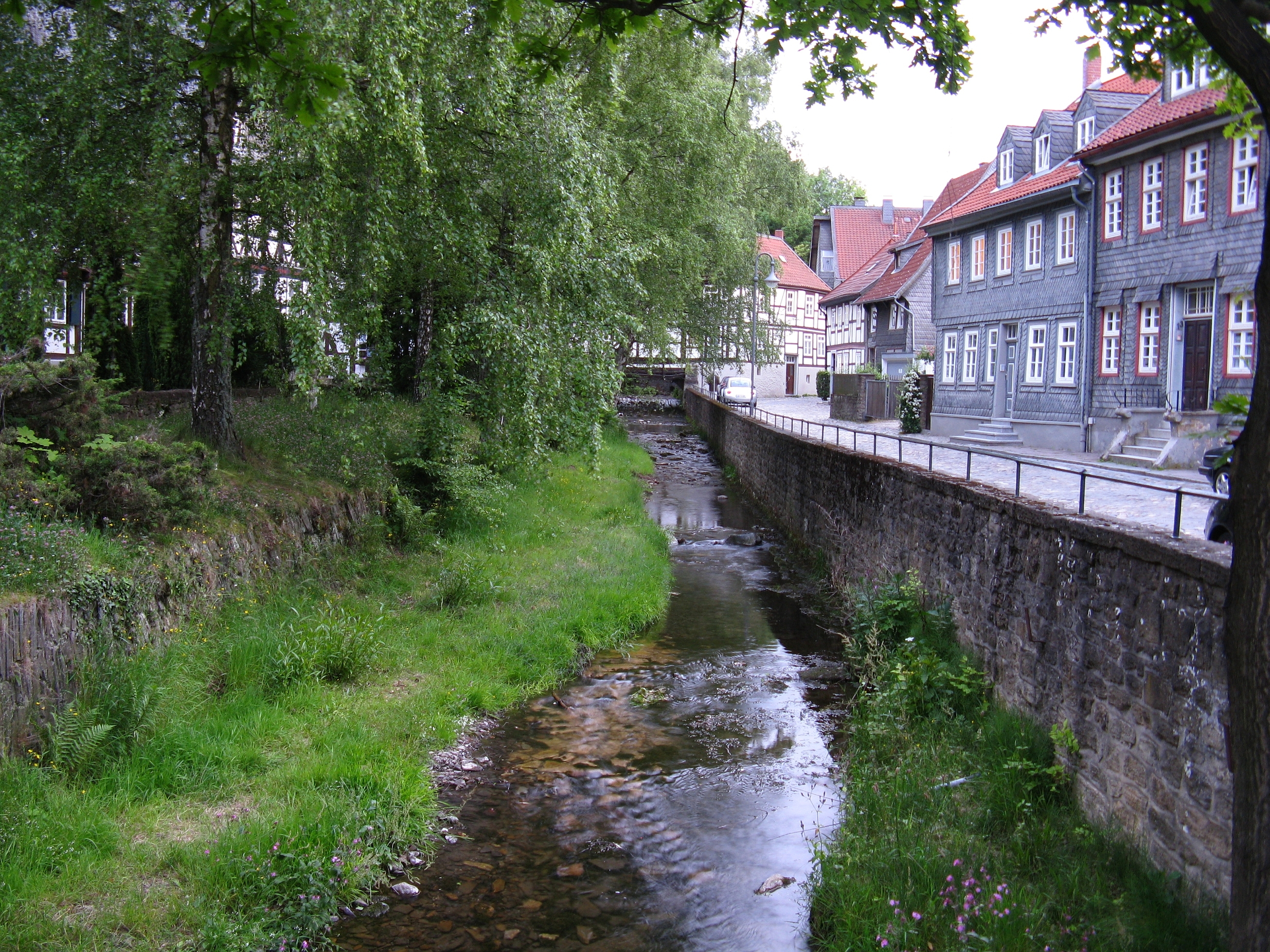
- The Abzucht in the historic Altstadt of Goslar

- Mouth

Location
- Country: Germany
- State: Lower Saxony
- Reference no.: DE: 48214

Physical characteristics
- Source
  - location: In Wintertal in the Harz Mountains
  - coordinates: 51°51′15″N 10°23′47″E
  - elevation: ca. 722 m above sea level (NN)
- Mouth
  - location: Near Oker (Goslar) into the Oker
  - coordinates: 51°54′45″N 10°29′08″E
  - elevation: ca. 192 m above sea level (NN)
- Length: 12.1 km (7.5 mi)
- Basin size: 31.2 km^{2} (12.0 mi^{2})

Basin features
- Progression: Oker→ Aller→ Weser→ North Sea
- Landmarks: Large towns: Goslar
- Tributaries
  - left: Gose
  - right: Dörpke, Gelmke

The Abzucht, also known in its upper reaches as the Wintertalbach, is a 12.1-kilometre (7.5 mi) long, orographically left-hand, tributary of the Oker in Lower Saxony, Germany. The stream flows through the town of Goslar.

== Geography ==
The Abzucht rises in the upper Winter valley (Wintertal) as the Wintertalbach at an elevation of 722 metres (2,369 ft) NN. Its source lies on the northeast flank of the Schalke. From here the stream flows initially in a northeasterly direction. West of the Rammelsberg the Abzucht is impounded by the Herzberger Teich. Below this pond the canalised stream passes through the area of the Rammelsberg Mine and reaches the southern edge of the town of Goslar. Here it is joined by the Gose from the left before the Abzucht swings towards the east. After running through the Old Town (Altstadt) of Goslar it continues on, accompanied by the B 498 federal road to Goslar-Oker where it discharges into the Oker from the left at an elevation of 192 m above NN.

Along its 12.1-kilometre (7.5 mi) long course the Abzucht descends a total of 188 metres (617 ft), which represents an average incline of 15.5 ‰. The stream drains a catchment area of 31.61 square kilometres (12.20 sq mi) before its waters pass down the Oker, Aller and Weser to the North Sea.

== History ==
While the water of the Gose can be used for brewing (Gose Beer), the Abzucht was heavily polluted by mining on the Rammelsberg. The name is derived from the word Abziehen i.e. 'flushing' or 'removing' the contaminated waters of the smelting works.

In the area of the Winter valley and the Rammelsberg Mine the Abzucht drove water wheels and was used for washing the ore. Inside the town walls and outside on its way to its confluence with the Oker it drove numerous water wheels that supplied the mills or other industrial works (fulling mills, saw mills, etc.) with energy. The use of its name interchangeably after its confluence with the Gose is still reflected today in several road names, such as An der Abzucht, An der Gose or Abzuchtstraße.

== Sources ==
- Nds. Landesbetrieb für Wasserwirtschaft und Küstenschutz (NLWK), Gewässergütebericht Oker 2002, 2002.
