= Oker =

River in Germany

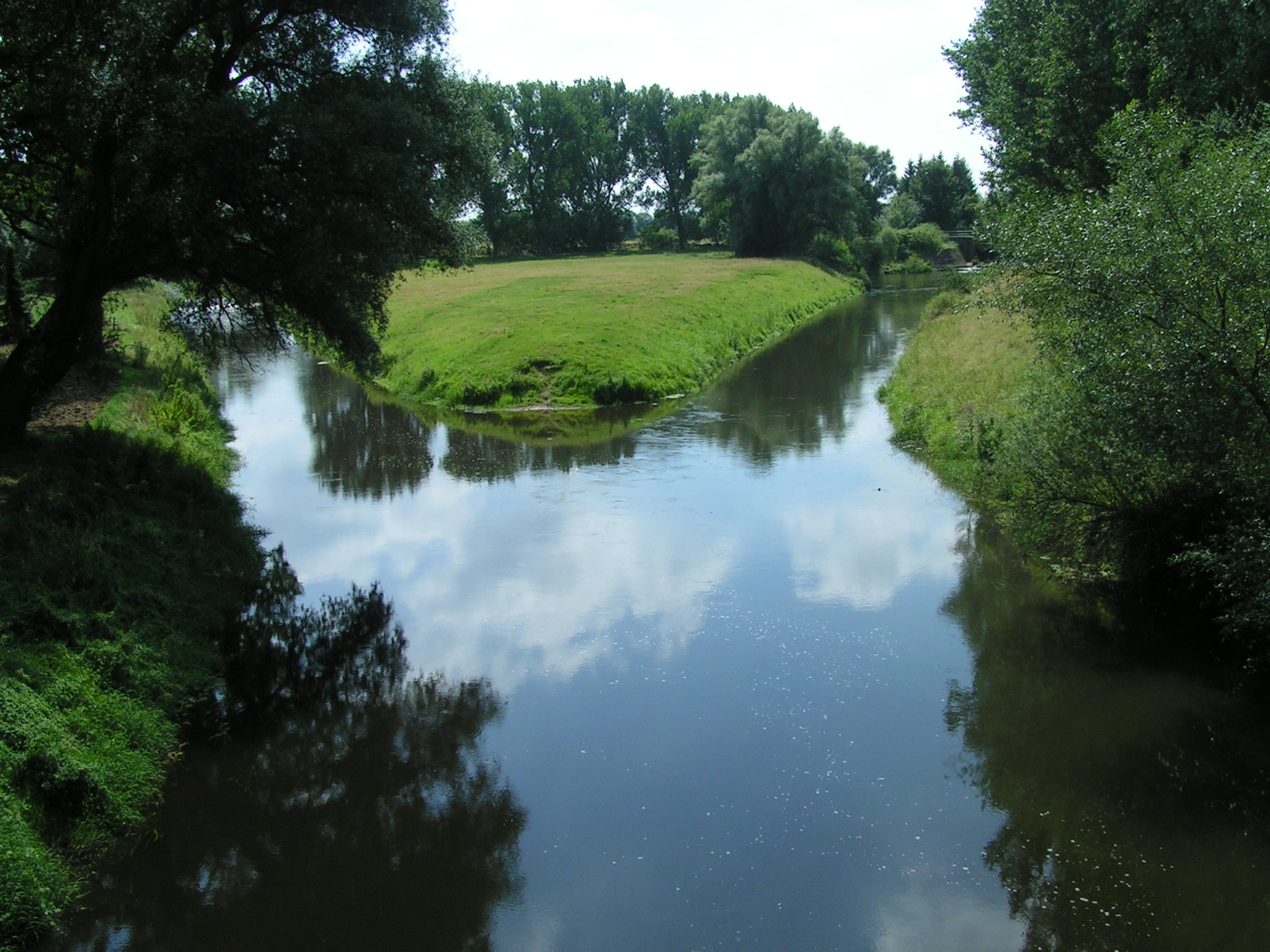
- Confluence of the Oker and Aller near Müden

Location
- Country: Germany

Physical characteristics
- Source
  - location: Harz Mountains
  - coordinates: 51°46′42″N 10°29′29″E
  - elevation: 900 metres (3,000 ft)
- Mouth
  - location: Aller
  - coordinates: 52°31′26″N 10°21′39″E
- Length: 128.2 km (79.7 mi)
- Basin size: 1,822 km^{2} (703 sq mi)

Basin features
- Progression: Aller→ Weser→ North Sea

The Oker (pronounced [ˈoːkɐ]) is a river in Lower Saxony, Germany, that has historically formed an important political boundary. It is a left tributary of the River Aller, 128 kilometres (80 mi) in length and runs in a generally northerly direction.

== Origin and meaning of the name ==
The river's name was recorded around 830 as Obacra and, later, as Ovokare und Ovakara. The origin of the name is derived from the roots ov- and -akara meaning “upper” (cf. New High German ober-) and “onward rushing” (rendered in German as “Vorwärtsdrängende”) as distinct from its tributary, the Ecker, whose name means only “onward rushing”.

== Course ==
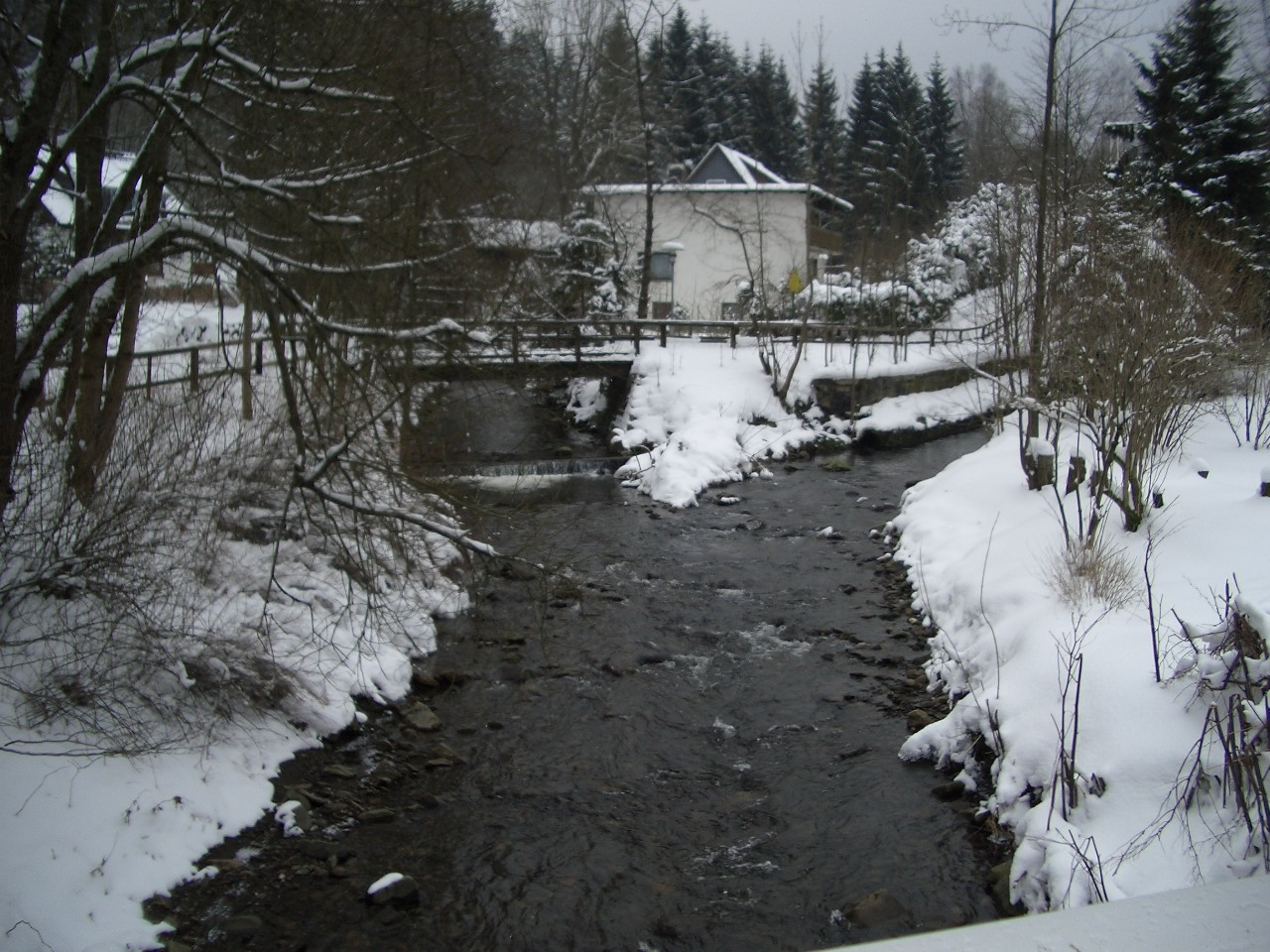
Confluence of the Oker (left) and Gerlachsbach (right) in Altenau

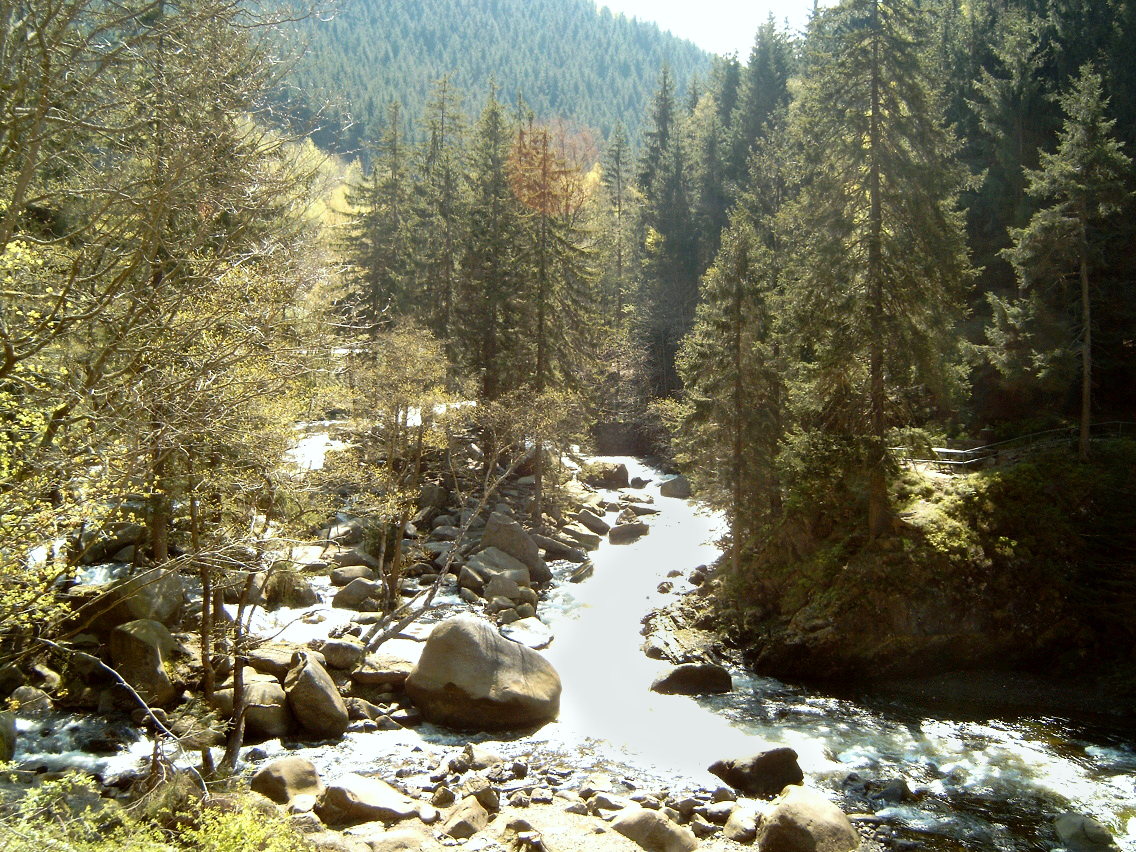
The Oker Valley (Okertal)

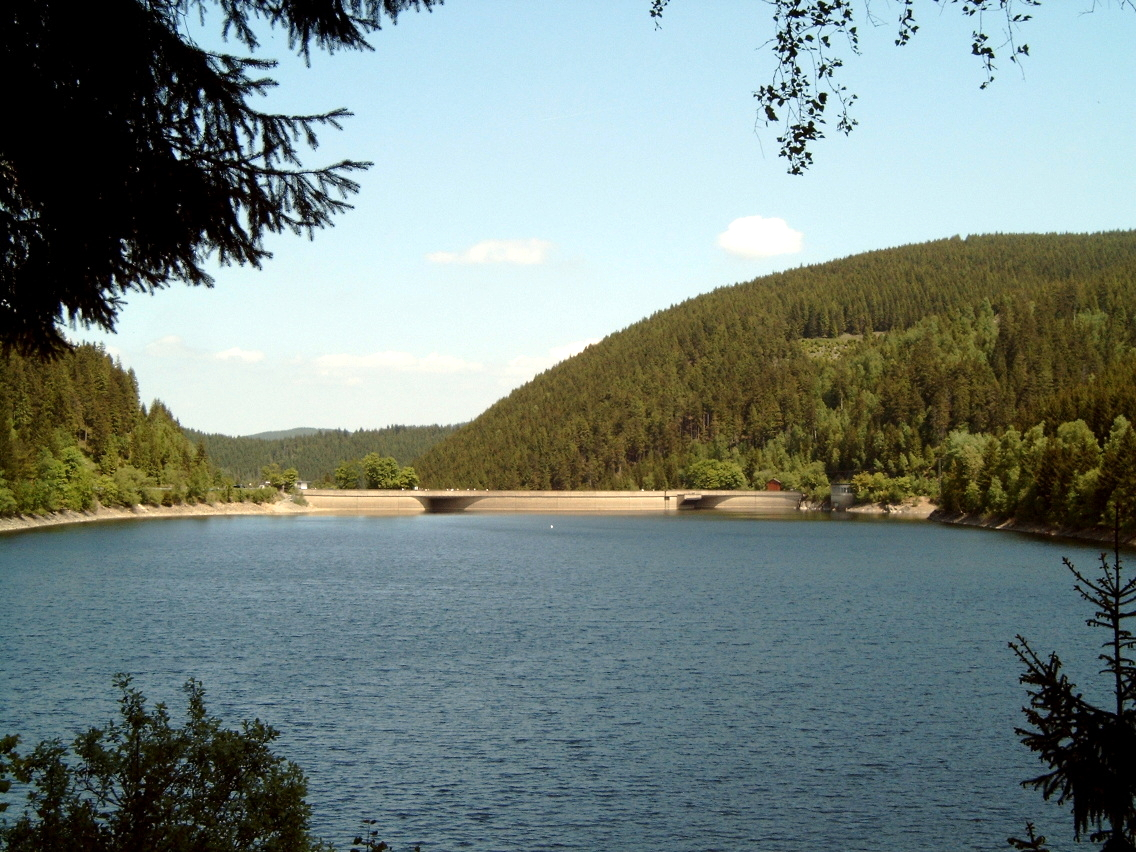
Oker Dam

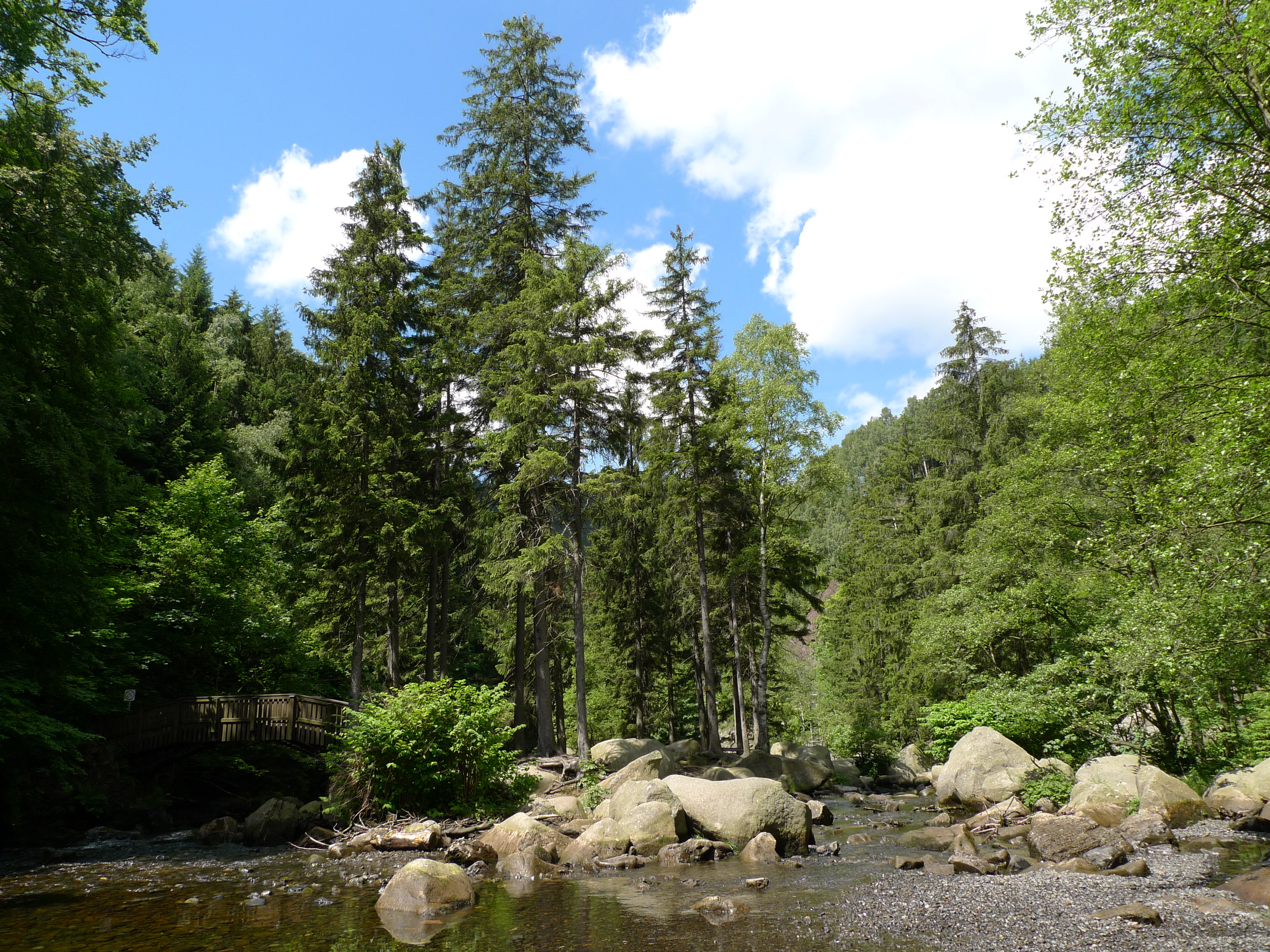
The Verlobungsinsel and Verlobung Bridge in the Oker valley near Romkerhall

The Oker rises at about 910 metres in the Harz National Park in a boggy area on the Bruchberg in the Harz mountains of central Germany. This early section is known as the Große Oker ("Great Oker") and it is impounded below Altenau by the Oker Dam. From the dam wall to the former village of Oker, which is today part of Goslar, the Oker is on certain occasions suitable for canoeing. This section, often called the "Oker Valley" (Okertal), includes the Romkerhall Waterfall. Here the Romke stream drops about 64 metres (210 ft) in height over a waterfall laid out in 1863 into the Oker. Downstream in the river's fast-flowing waters, the Verlobungsinsel ("Betrothal Island") is to be found. Left and right of the Oker in this area are many crags that are popular with climbers.

In the Goslar vicinity of Oker the river is seriously polluted with heavy metals from the slag heaps as well as groundwater and surface runoff from the metal smelters there.

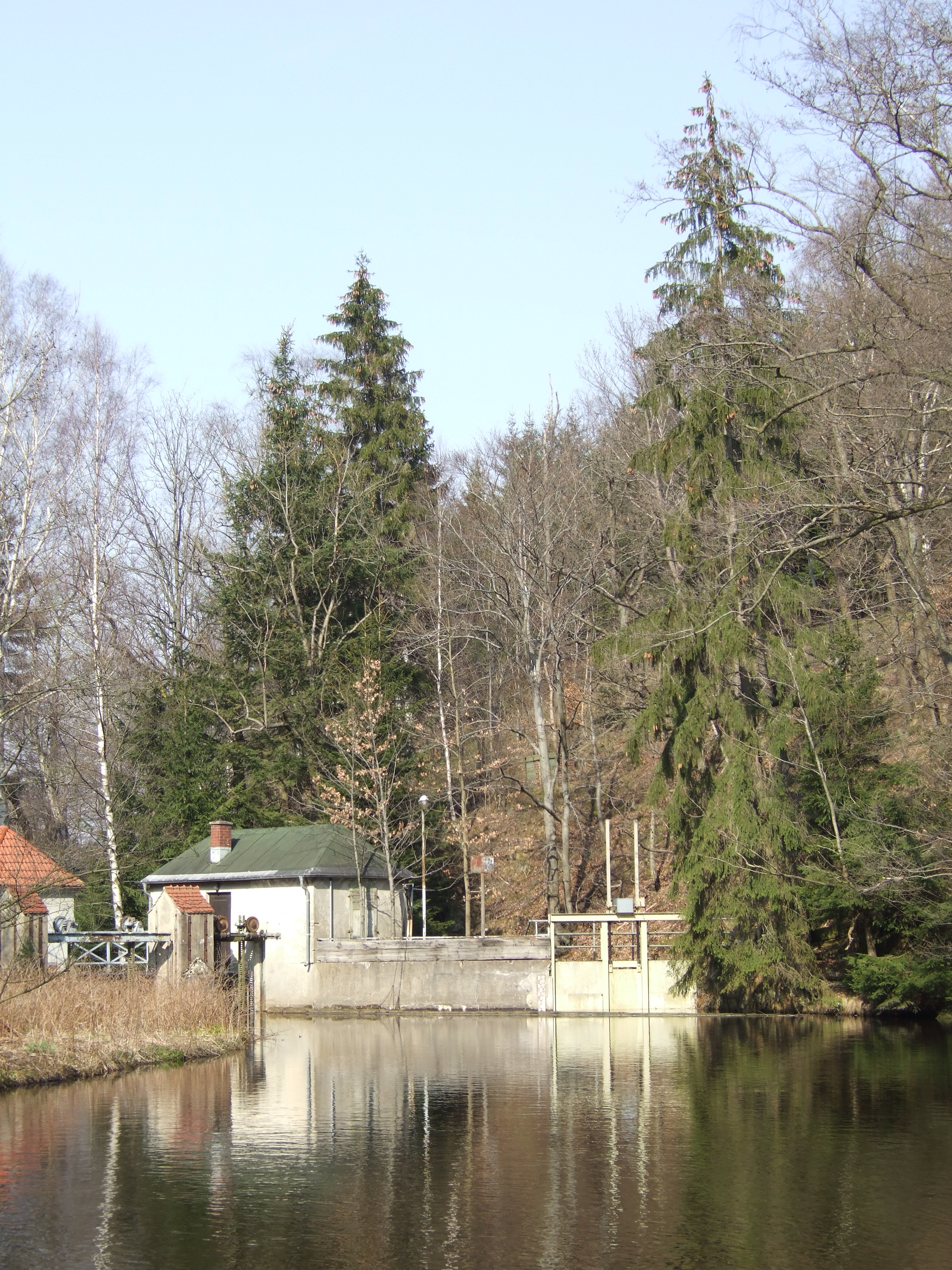
The Oker Weir in Oker

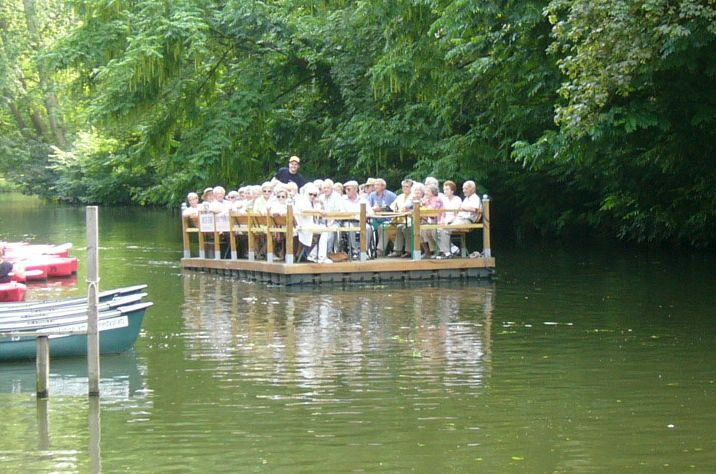
Raft on the Oker Bypass Channel in Braunschweig

From the village of Oker the River Oker flows away in a northeasterly direction to Vienenburg, where it is joined from the south by the Radau and then from the southeast by the Ecker. After these two confluences the river continues southeast past the Harly Forest, after which it bends north to flow through Schladen and Wolfenbüttel to Braunschweig. In south Braunschweig the Oker is dammed by the Eisenbüttel Weir. In the Bürgerpark shortly before Braunschweig's old town the Oker divides into the western and eastern bypass channels (Umflutgraben) which circumnavigate the historic city centre at a slightly higher level. These channels were laid in the 16th century as the external moats of the town's defences. The actual course of the Oker through the centre of the town was covered and, today, runs through pipes emerging again north of the old town. The water level in the city area is controlled by the St. Peter's Gate Weir (Petritorwehr) in the western and the "Wends Weir" (Wendenwehr) in the eastern ditch. Following the merger of the two channels northwest of the city centre the Oker runs north of the district of Watenbüttel in a culvert under the Mittelland Canal before it is joined by the Schunter from the east near Groß Schwülper. It then flows down to its mouth into the River Aller, which is located between Gifhorn and Celle at Müden.

== The Oker as border river ==
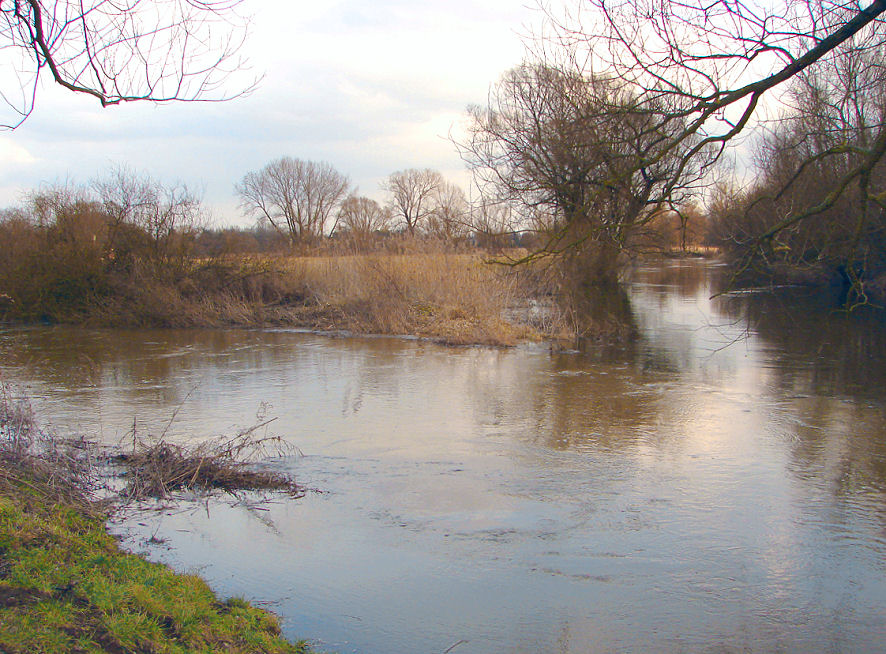
Mouth of the Schunter into the Oker near Groß Schwülper

Since the early ninth century the middle Oker river has formed the diocesan boundary between the bishoprics of Halberstadt and Hildesheim, established by Emperor Charlemagne and his son Louis the Pious in the Duchy of Saxony. North of Schladen the royal palace (Königspfalz) of Werla was established on the banks about 20 metres (66 ft) above the river bed. From the High Middle Ages the Oker between the villages of Ohrum and Börßum formed the eastern boundary of the Prince-Bishopric of Hildesheim with the Duchy of Brunswick-Wolfenbüttel, and further south to Wiedelah (today part of Vienenburg) with the Prince-Bishopric of Halberstadt, which became the Prussian Principality of Halberstadt following its secularization in 1648.

The Bishopric of Halberstadt was likewise mediatised in 1803, and according to the Final Act of the 1815 Vienna Congress, the Oker was the eastern border of the Kingdom of Hanover with the Duchy of Brunswick and the Prussian Province of Saxony. When the Kingdom of Prussia annexed Hanover in 1866, it became the inner Prussian border between the provinces of Hanover and Saxony as well as the border, north of Börßum to Ohrum between the Province of Hanover in the west and the Duchy of Brunswick in the east. From 1945 to 1990 the Inner German border between East and West Germany ran down the centre of the Oker between Wiedelah and Schladen, today between the German states of Saxony-Anhalt and Lower Saxony.

Since the Expo 2000 bridges over the Oker in Braunschweig and its surrounding area were artistically designed; after 2004 this was carried out as part of the Okerlicht project.

== Tributaries ==
Left tributaries (from source to mouth):

- Lange
- Abzucht
- Ohebach
- Weddebach
- Warne
- Brückenbach
- Thiedebach

Right tributaries:

- Hurlebach
- Radau
- Ecker
- Ilse
- Altenau
- Schunter
- Bickgraben

== See also ==
- List of rivers of Lower Saxony

== See also ==
Oste class fleet service ship
