= Kalte Birke =

Cross tracks in the Harz Mountains of Germany

Coordinates: 51°54′28″N 10°15′10″E

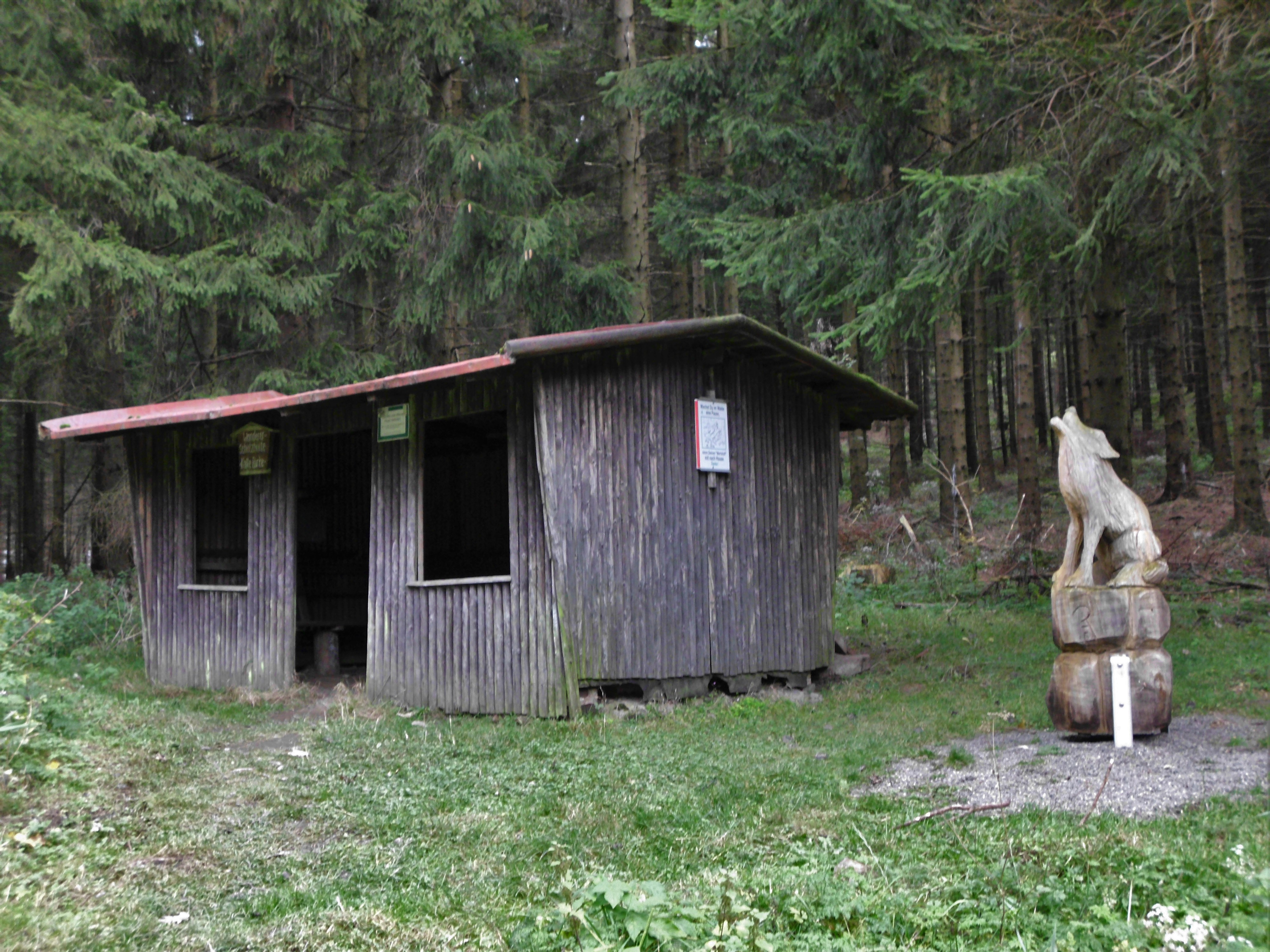
Refuge hut at the Kalte Birke

The Kalte Birke is a cross tracks in the Harz Mountains of Germany where there is a refuge hut and former settlement. It is located west of the Innerste Reservoir at about 540 metres above sea level. It lies in the unincorporated area of Harz in the county of Goslar. Historically it is closely linked to the municipality of Hahausen and village of Neuekrug, four kilometres northwest.

== History ==
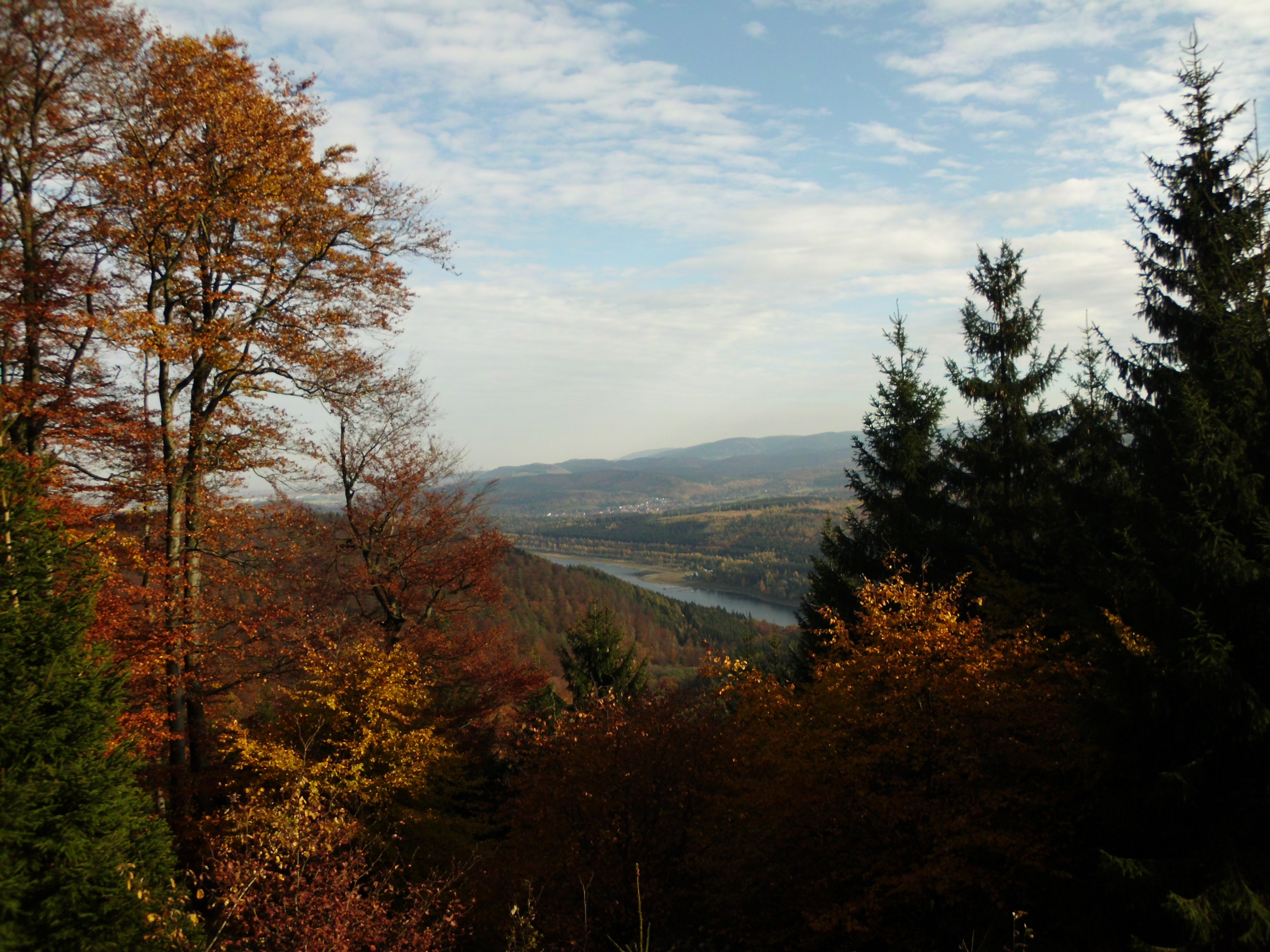
View of the Innerste Reservoir from the Lageswarte, just under 1 km north of the Kalte Birke

In the area of the Kalte Birke and the Lageswarte (571 m above NHN) just north of it, was an important trading route, the Innerste Rennsteig, which ran between Buntenbock and Neuekrug and had been established since the early Middle Ages. The initial occupation of the site and the origin of its name are unclear.

The Kalte Birke was documented as early as 1350. A letter from the year 1391 shows that an enclosure was located at the Kalte Birke in the 14th century. The use of the site as a place where records were kept and negotiations were held, is seen in other written records. They also suggest that there had been a permanent building on this spot at least since the late Middle Ages.

In the years 1511 and 1518 the Kalte Birke is mentioned as a hunting ground.

Around 1350, iron ore mining in the area was discontinued for the first time. But the references to the Kalte Birke in a 1520 register and by Georgius Agricola in 1546 in the 5th volume of De Natura Fossilium, a textbook on mineralogy indicate that there was a resumption of mining in this area in the first half of the 16th century. The veins in the north west Harz near the Kalte Birke continued to be mentioned several times and were mined until the 20th century. The original meaning of the name Kalte Birke (literally: "Cold Birch") has not yet been clarified. It could have served as a place ensuring the security of the route or may have had mining, forestry or hunting purposes.

In 1635 the territory, as part of the Communion of Harz (Kommunionsharz) was acquired by the Principality of Brunswick-Wolfenbüttel. From that time, a hunting house stood on the Kalte Birke run by the Forestry Commission at Lutter am Barenberge, then from 1676 or 1678, by the forester in Hahausen. Little more is known about this hunting house. However, from the late 17th century there was another residential house on the Kalte Birke. It was built and inhabited by a Hahausen timber hewer. In 1702 the old hunting lodge was replaced by a new building. When the Communion of Harz was divided in 1788 the Kalte Birke came under the rule of the Electorate of Hanover. It was located close to the border. Brunswick's hunting rights in this area existed for many more years thereafter, as documents dating to the 19th century bear witness. In 1792 the hunting house had a barn, a wagon shed, a cowshed and a bakery. Even at the beginning of the 19th century, the Kalte Birke was mentioned several times. From 1807 to 1813 it belonged to the Canton of Zellerfeld in the District of Osterode.

In 1828 the settlement was eventually sold. The hunting house was demolished and rebuilt in Hahausen behind the church. Since then, the place has been deserted. The refuge hut was built in 1969 by the Harz Club. There are still wall remains and the site of the old fountain.

=== Population change ===
| Year | Population |
|---|---|
| 1774 | 6 |
| 1812 | 19 |
| 1828 | 0 |

== Walking ==
The Kalte Birke lies on the Harzer Försterstieg, a trail that runs from Goslar via Wolfshagen im Harz, Lautenthal, Wildemann, Bad Grund (Harz), Buntenbock and Lerbach to Riefensbeek-Kamschlacken near Osterode am Harz. It is no. 103 in the system of check points in the Harzer Wandernadel hiking challenge.

Three kilometres to the south is the Tränkebach Hut and one kilometre north is the Vereinsplatz, which are checkpoint no. 104 and no. 102 in the Harzer Wandernadel.

== Literature ==
Zum Abschnitt Geschichte: Kalthammer, Wilhelm: Die Chronik von Hahausen; Druckerei M. Wirth GmbH, Hahausen 1983 (S. 182 f.)
(veröffentlicht auf www.hahausen-harz.de: Die Chronik von Hahausen. Abschnitt: Die "Kalte Birke")
