= Ecker Dam =

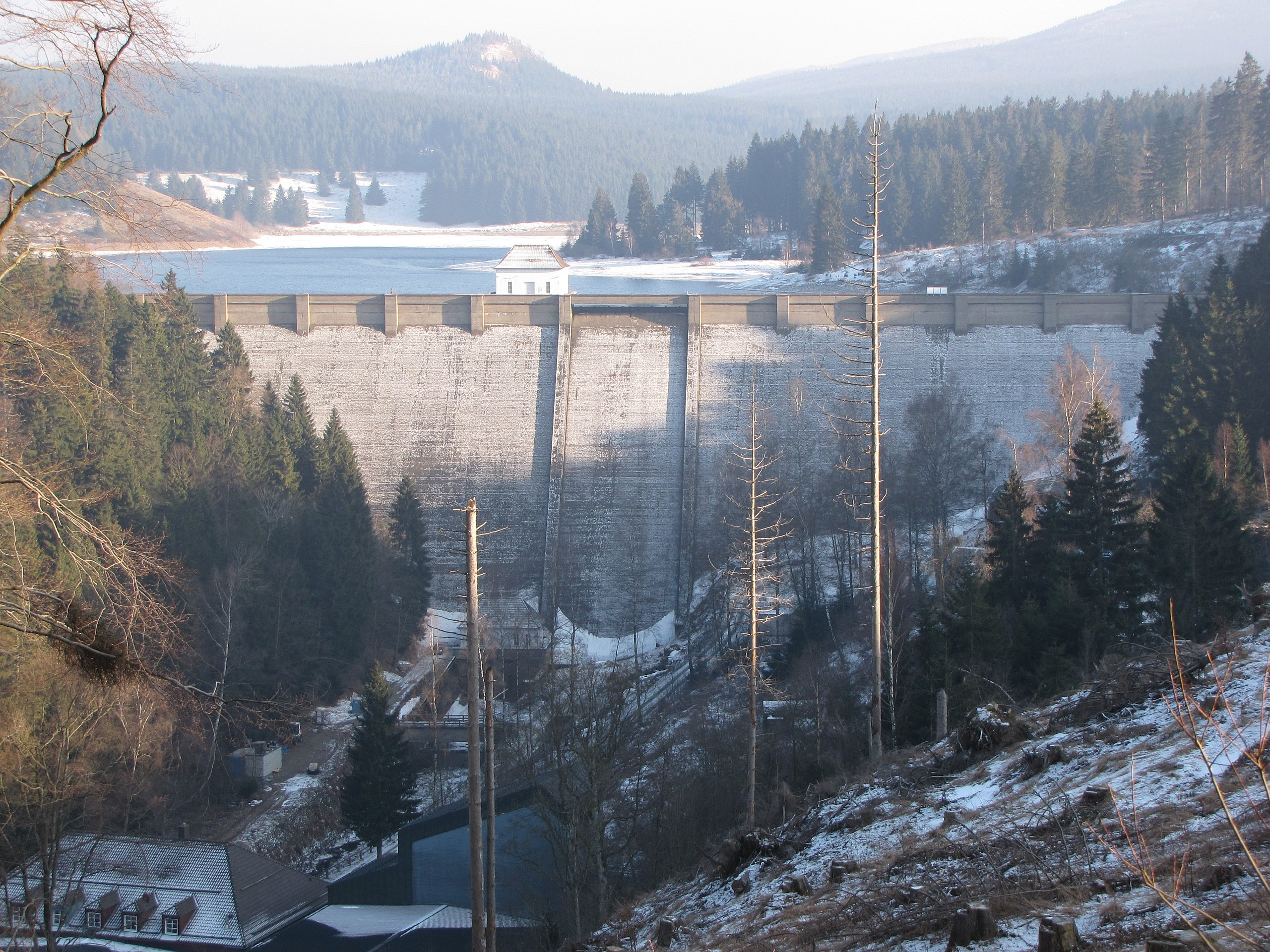
- Dam wall

- Location within Germany
- Country: Germany
- Location: Lower Saxony/Saxony-Anhalt
- Coordinates: 51°50′08″N 10°35′15″E
- Construction began: 1939
- Opening date: 1942

Dam and spillways
- Type of dam: Gravity dam
- Impounds: Ecker
- Height: 65 m (213 ft)
- Length: 235 m (771 ft)
- Width (crest): 2.2 m (7 ft)
- Dam volume: 168,000 m^{3} (5,900,000 ft^{3})

Reservoir
- Total capacity: 13,270,000 m^{3} (469,000,000 ft^{3})
- Catchment area: 19 km^{2} (7 mi^{2})
- Surface area: 68 ha (1 km^{2})

Power Station
- Operator: Harzwasserwerke
- Type: Conventional
- Installed capacity: 2 x 300,000 W (400 hp)
- Annual generation: 1,400,000 kWh (5,000,000 MJ)

The Ecker Dam (German: Eckertalsperre) is a gravity dam in the Harz mountain range near Bad Harzburg, Germany. Constructed between 1939 and 1943, it is today operated by the Harzwasserwerke company. The dam's reservoir impounds the waters of the Ecker river and mainly serves for drinking water supply.

== Operation ==
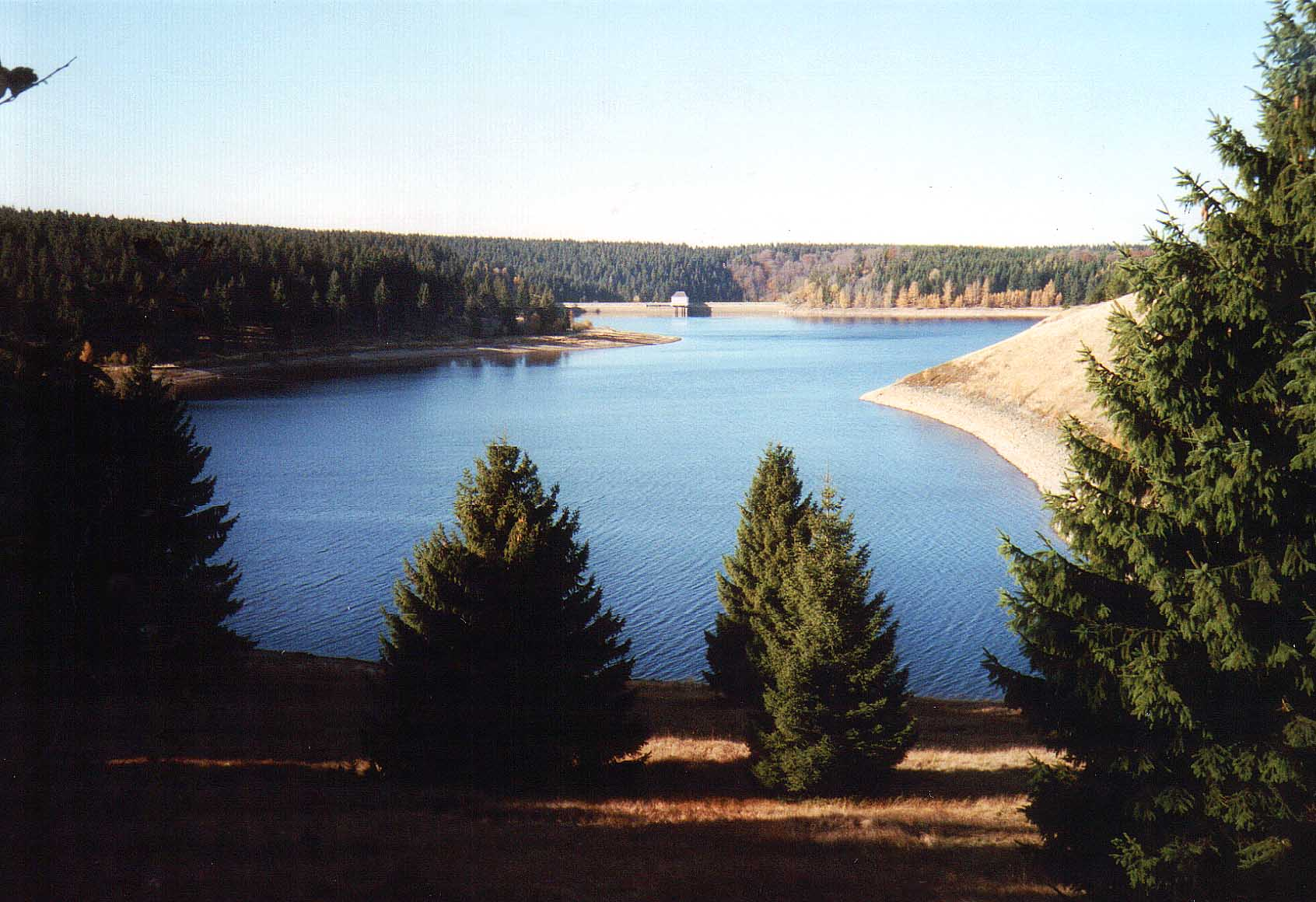
Ecker Reservoir

The dam is used for the supply of drinking water, flood protection, and raising water levels during times of low rainfall. With an average discharge of 16 million m³ per year, it provides drinking water to the cities of Brunswick, Wolfenbüttel, and Wolfsburg. A pipe system leads to a central water tower near Liebenburg, where the waters of the nearby Grane Dam are also collected.

Electricity generation is also provided through a small hydropower plant, operated by two turbines with an installed capacity of 2 x 300 kW and an annual generation of 1,400,000 kWh.

== Construction ==
The Ecker Dam was the third modern reservoir built in the Harz mountains, after the construction of the Söse Dam in 1928–1931 and the Oder Dam in 1930–1933. It was laid out in the Ecker catchment area at the foot of the Brocken massif, characterised by extended upland bogs and heavy precipitation of up to 1,700 mm (67 in) a year. The reservoir uses a section of the river valley which, below a prominent trough end, was dug out in the shape of a basin by an ice age glacier.

Construction started in 1939, mainly to meet the increasing demand for drinking water in the Brunswick greater area and around the recently opened Wolfsburg Volkswagen Plant. For the first time in Germany, coarse-grained concrete (Rüttelgrobbeton) with an aggregate of up to 300 mm grain size was used to build the gravity structure. Works continued throughout World War II, when the Nazi authorities also deployed foreign workers (Fremdarbeiter) and POWs to complete the facilities.

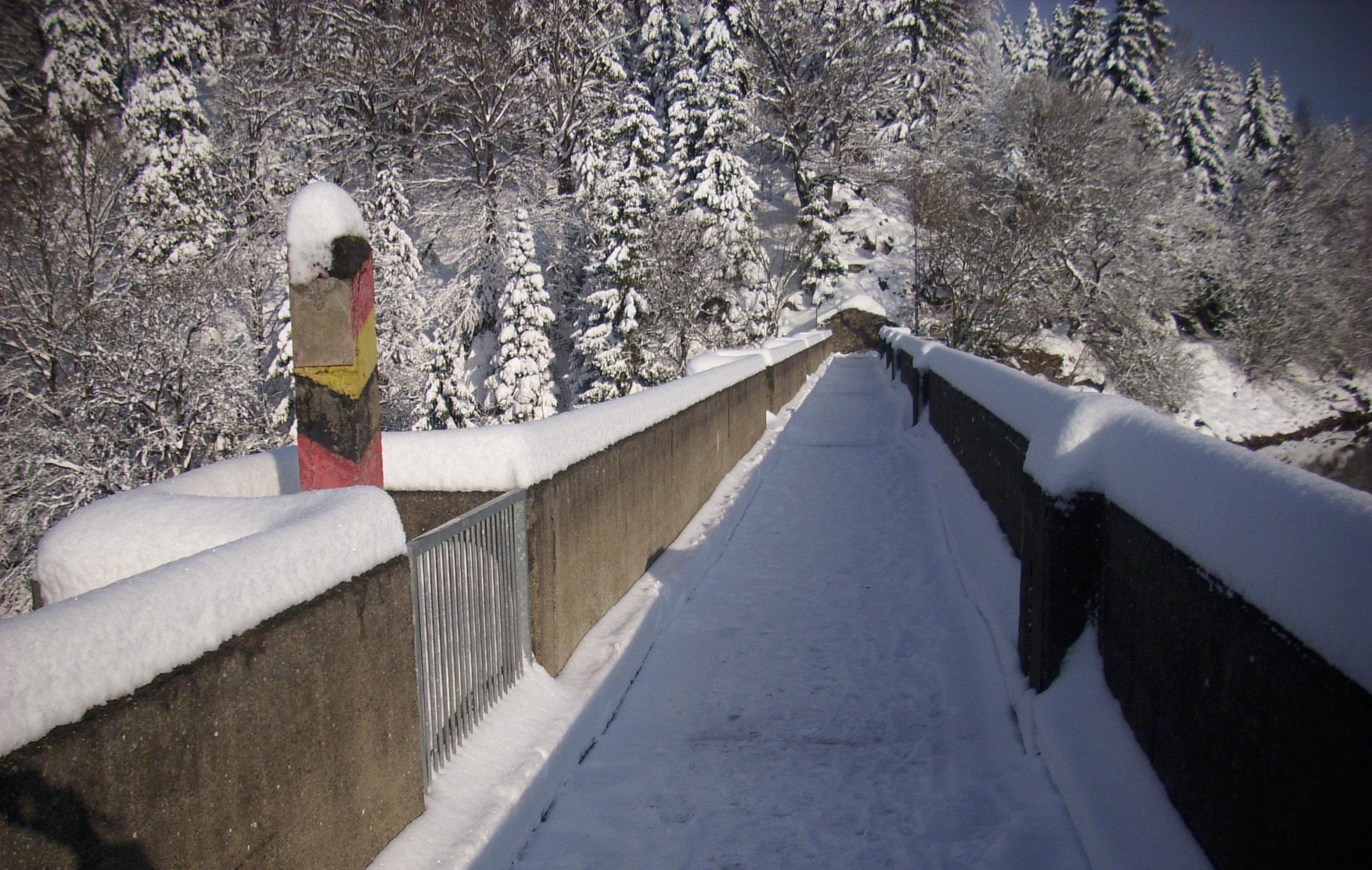
Preserved East German border post on the dam crest

After the war and the division into East and West Germany from 1949, the inner German Border ran straight through the site. The Border Troops of the German Democratic Republic had walls and barbed wire mounted on the dam crest and only about two-thirds of the facilities were accessible from the west. Access rights to operate the facilities were settled by bilateral agreements in the late 1970s.

== Tourism ==
Though not accessible by car, the Ecker Dam and the circular trail around its reservoir are popular destinations for daytrippers. The dam wall is checkpoint no. 1 in the Harzer Wandernadel hiking trail network.

== See also ==
- List of dams in the Harz
- List of reservoirs and dams in Germany
- Hiking trails in Germany

== Notes ==
- Peter Franke; Wolfgang Frey (1987), Talsperren in der Bundesrepublik Deutschland (in German), Berlin: Systemdruck, ISBN 3-926520-00-0
