= Bornhausen =

- Ortsteil of Seesen
- Interactive map of Bornhausen
- Location within Germany Location within Lower Saxony
- Coordinates: 51°53′35″N 10°10′42″E
- Country: Germany
- State: Lower Saxony
- District: Goslar
- Town: Seesen

Government
  - Mayor: Detlef Gelbe (SPD)

Population
  - Total: 1,031
- Time zone: UTC+01:00 (CET)
  - Summer (DST): UTC+02:00 (CEST)
- Postal codes: 38723
- Dialling codes: 05381
- Vehicle registration: GS

Bornhausen is a district of Seesen in the county of Goslar, in Lower Saxony. It is next to Rhüden in the northernmost part of the town. It has an approximate population of 1030.

== History ==
The first time mentioned in a document 973 Anno Domini.
