= Wallmoden =

Place in Lower Saxony, Germany

- Ortschaft of Langelsheim
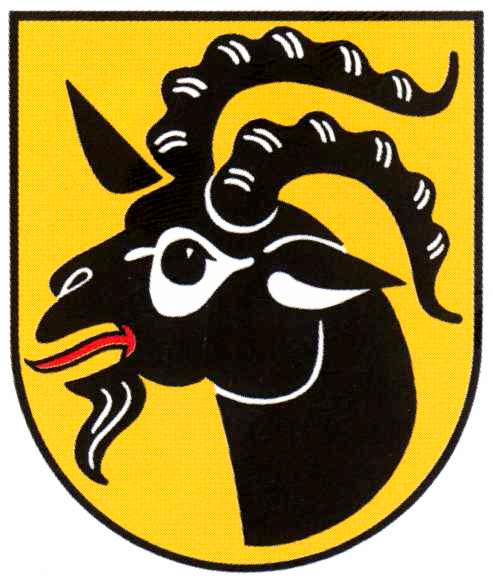
- Coat of arms
- Interactive map of Wallmoden
- Location within Germany Location within Lower Saxony
- Coordinates: 52°01′16″N 10°18′20″E
- Country: Germany
- State: Lower Saxony
- District: Goslar
- Town: Langelsheim
- Subdivisions: 3 Ortsteile

Area
  - Total: 16.82 km^{2} (6.49 sq mi)
- Elevation: 130 m (430 ft)

Population (2020)
  - Total: 907
  - Density: 53.9/km^{2} (140/sq mi)
- Time zone: UTC+01:00 (CET)
  - Summer (DST): UTC+02:00 (CEST)
- Postal codes: 38729
- Dialling codes: 05341, 05383
- Vehicle registration: GS
- Website: www.sg-lutter.de

Wallmoden is a village and a former municipality in the district of Goslar in Lower Saxony, Germany. Since 1 November 2021, it is part of the town Langelsheim, of which it is an Ortschaft. It was the ancestral seat of the House of Wallmoden.

== Population ==
As of 30 June 2020 there were 907 inhabitants in Wallmoden.
