= Neuekrug-Hahausen–Goslar railway =

Railway line in Germany

Goslar–Neuekrug-Hahausen railway

Overview
- Line number: 1930
- Locale: Lower Saxony, Germany

Service
- Route number: 354

Technical
- Line length: 16.2 km (10.1 mi)
- Track gauge: 1,435 mm (4 ft 8 1/2 in) standard gauge
- Operating speed: 100 km/h (62.1 mph) (max)

The Neuekrug-Hahausen–Goslar railway is a double-tracked, non-electrified main line in Lower Saxony in central Germany. The line, which runs along the northern edge of the Harz mountains, begins in Goslar and forms a junction with the Brunswick–Kreiensen railway to Seesen and Kreiensen at Neuekrug-Hahausen. Because the branch-off station is passed through nowadays without stopping, it is often called the Goslar–Seesen railway. It is often described in the local area as the North Harz Line (Nordharzstrecke) but the term may cause confusion. The most important, and now the only, intermediate station is Langelsheim.

== History ==
The Vienenburg–Langelsheim railway via Grauhof from the Magdeburg-Halberstadt Railway was opened in 1875 and was extended (as the Innerste Valley Railway) to Lautenthal, later via Clausthal to Altenau. Here a branch line of the Brunswick Railway Company to Neuekrug-Hahausen was opened on 15 September 1877, which saved east-west goods trains from Halberstadt to Kreiensen having to use the bypass via Salzgitter-Ringelheim. This railway company also built an extension to Goslar, which was opened on 1 May 1883.

After that goods trains ran over the more level line through Grauhof, whilst passenger trains ran via Goslar. In addition local goods trains also served Langelsheim, Herzog-Julius-Hütte and Goslar.

The old goods line via Grauhof was a victim of the division of Germany and lost its traffic in 1954. In 1976 the Innerste Valley Railway was also closed; only the more recent railway remains in Langelsheim.

Today the railway operates passengers services that run every two hours.
