= Wolfshagen im Harz =

Place in Lower Saxony, Germany

- Ortsteil of Langelsheim
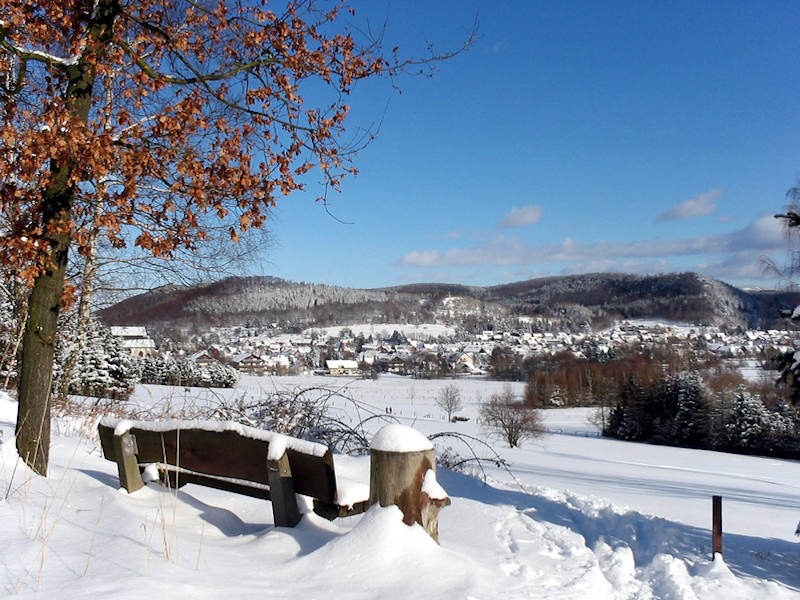
- Wolfshagen im Harz in winter

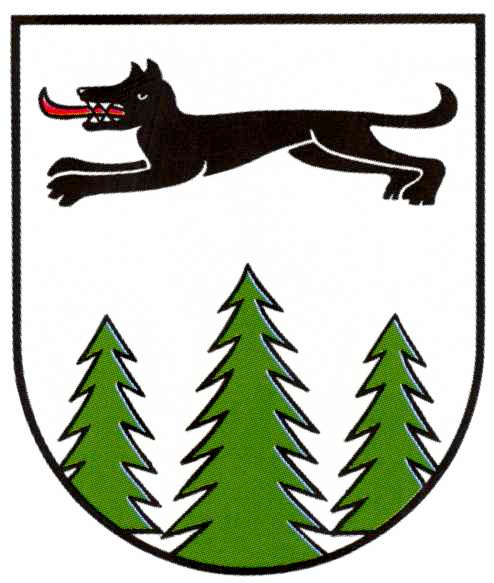
- Coat of arms
- Interactive map of Wolfshagen im Harz
- Location within Germany Location within Lower Saxony
- Coordinates: 51°54′38″N 10°19′17″E
- Country: Germany
- State: Lower Saxony
- District: Goslar
- Town: Langelsheim
- Elevation: 254 m (833 ft)

Population
  - Total: 2,257
- Time zone: UTC+01:00 (CET)
  - Summer (DST): UTC+02:00 (CEST)
- Postal codes: 38685
- Dialling codes: 05326
- Vehicle registration: GS
- Website: www.wolfshagen.de

Wolfshagen im Harz (German pronunciation: [vɔlfˈhaːɡn̩ ʔɪm ˈhaːɐ̯ts], lit. 'Wolfshagen in the Harz'; abbr. Wolfshagen) is a subdivision of the town of Langelsheim in the district of Goslar in Lower Saxony, Germany.

== Geography ==
Wolfshagen im Harz is located in the Upper Harz on the northern edge of the Harz in the Harz Nature Park. It is located between the Innerste Dam in the west and the Grane Dam in the east and between the towns of Seesen in the Westsüdwesten and Goslar in the east at about 260 to 430 m above sea level. Northeast of the center lies Heimberg (352.5 m). Through the village runs the Harz Försterstieg. In addition, the starting point of the Steinway Trails which ends in Seesen is in Wolfshagen im Harz.

Wolfshagen in the Harz was first mentioned in 1316 as Wulveshagen; the place name ending -hagen indicates the settlement as a place of the medieval deforestation period. The village had about 2000 inhabitants in 1958. As of 30 June 2018, there were 2,257 inhabitants.

Wolfshagen im Harz was incorporated on the occasion of the Lower Saxony territorial reform on 1 July 1972 in the city of Langelsheim.

== Nature ==
The nature around Wolfshagen is largely intact; some of the animal and plant species found there are endemic to the Harz region. For example, a large population of the garlic toad (Pelobates fuscus), which is listed on the Red List of Endangered Species by the IUCN, lives in a quarry on Heimberg. Every year during the spawning season, measures are taken to ensure their survival.

== Popular event ==
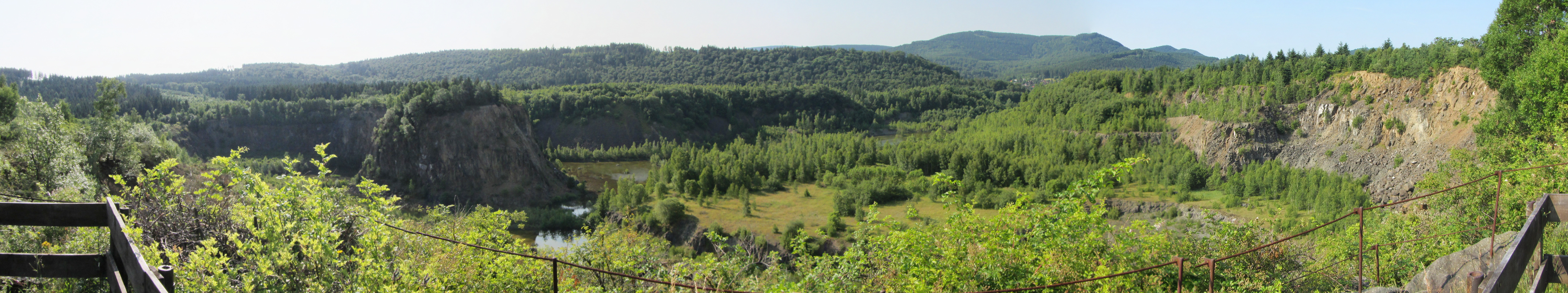
Each year, on April 30 and May 1, thousands come to Wolfshagen im Harz to celebrate Walpurgis, a festival to celebrate the beginning of summer: people dress like witches and perform dances.

== Notable people ==
- Henry E. Steinway, fought in the Battle of Waterloo and founded Steinway and Sons, a piano company
