= Innerste Dam =

Embankment dam in Germany

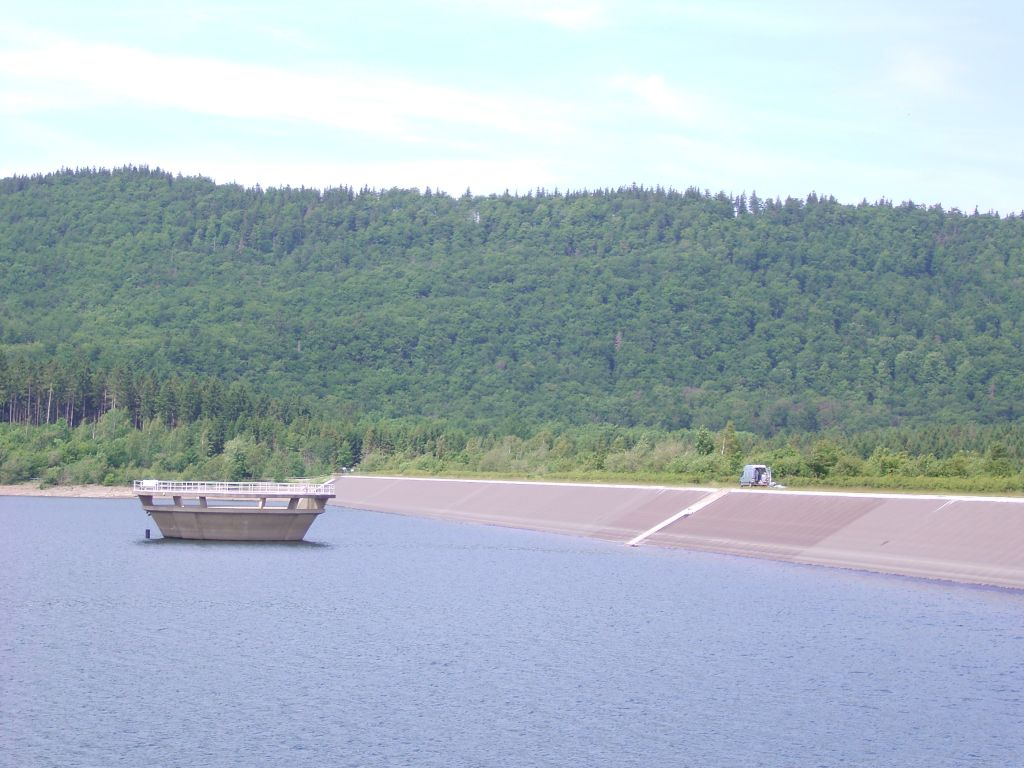
- Interactive map of Innerste Dam
- Country: Germany
- Location: Lower Saxony
- Coordinates: 51°54′41″N 10°17′03″E
- Construction began: 1963
- Opening date: 1966

Dam and spillways
- Height: 40 m (130 ft)
- Length: 750 m (2,460 ft)
- Width (crest): 8 m
- Dam volume: 850,000 m³

Reservoir
- Total capacity: 19.26 million m³
- Catchment area: 97 km²
- Surface area: 139 ha

The Innerste Dam (German: Innerstetalsperre) is a dam on the Innerste river, which lies near Langelsheim and Wolfshagen in the Harz mountains. It was built between 1963 and 1966 and belongs to the Harzwasserwerke. Its purposes are the supply of drinking water, flood protection, water flow regulation and hydroelectric power generation. The average annual discharge through the Innerste Dam is 60 million m³.

== Structures ==
The Innerste is an earth-fill dam with multiple, external, asphaltic concrete layers. It has an inspection gangway along its whole length on the upstream apron. In front of the upstream base of the dam is a shaft spillway (a flood overflow tower), into which also the bottom outlet is integrated. The water of the Innerste Dam can be pumped via a 4.6 km long diversion channel to the Grane Dam further east, where it can be used for water treatment. From 2003 to 2005 the reservoir was completely emptied and renovated, especially the asphalt sealing and the bottom outlet. This work was finished in September 2005.

== Flood control ==
Because the reservoir only has a limited flood control capacity (i.e. its capacity is relatively small in relation to the annual discharge), it can only check flooding within certain limits. The flood relief facility (spillway) is used about every two years. Nevertheless, even when the Innerste Dam overflows, the level of retention significantly reduces and delays flooding.

== Recreation ==
The reservoir may be used by sailing and rowing boats and for angling and camping. The Innerste Valley Railway is an old railway line, that had a halt by the Innerste Dam.

== Gallery ==
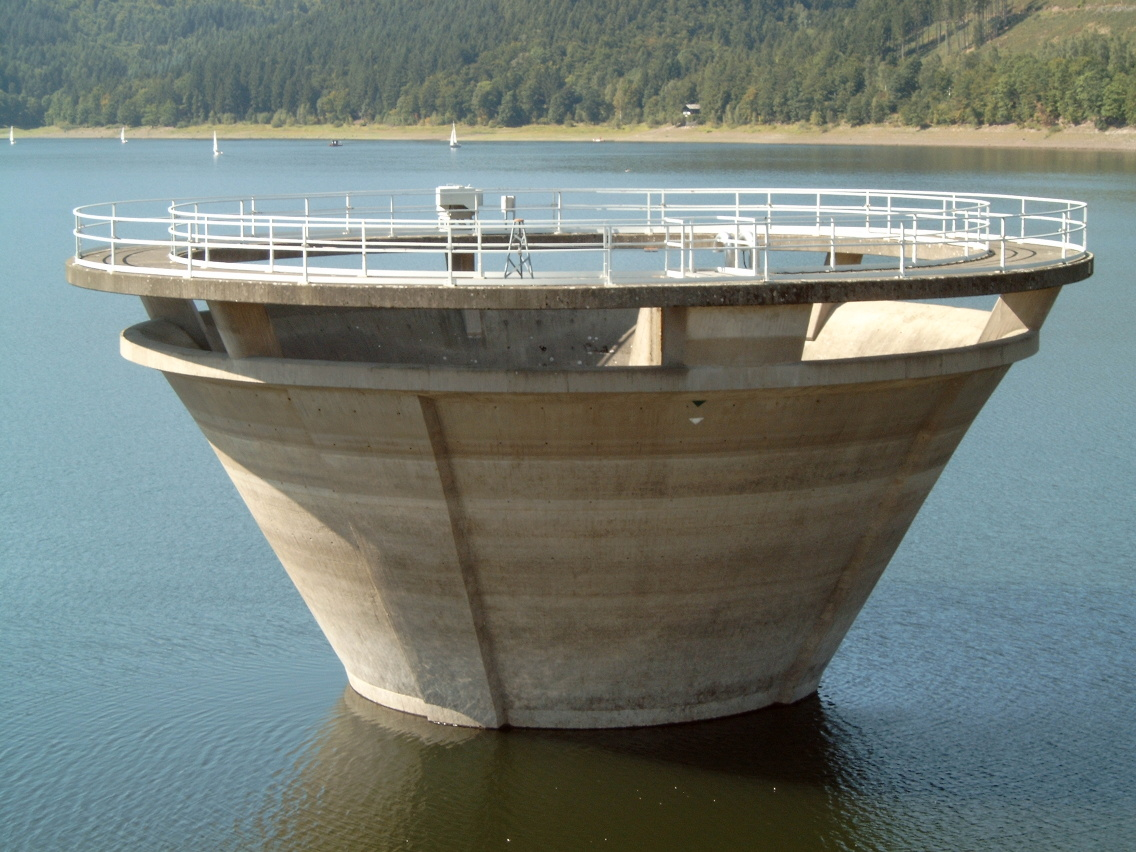
Shaft spillway in the reservoir

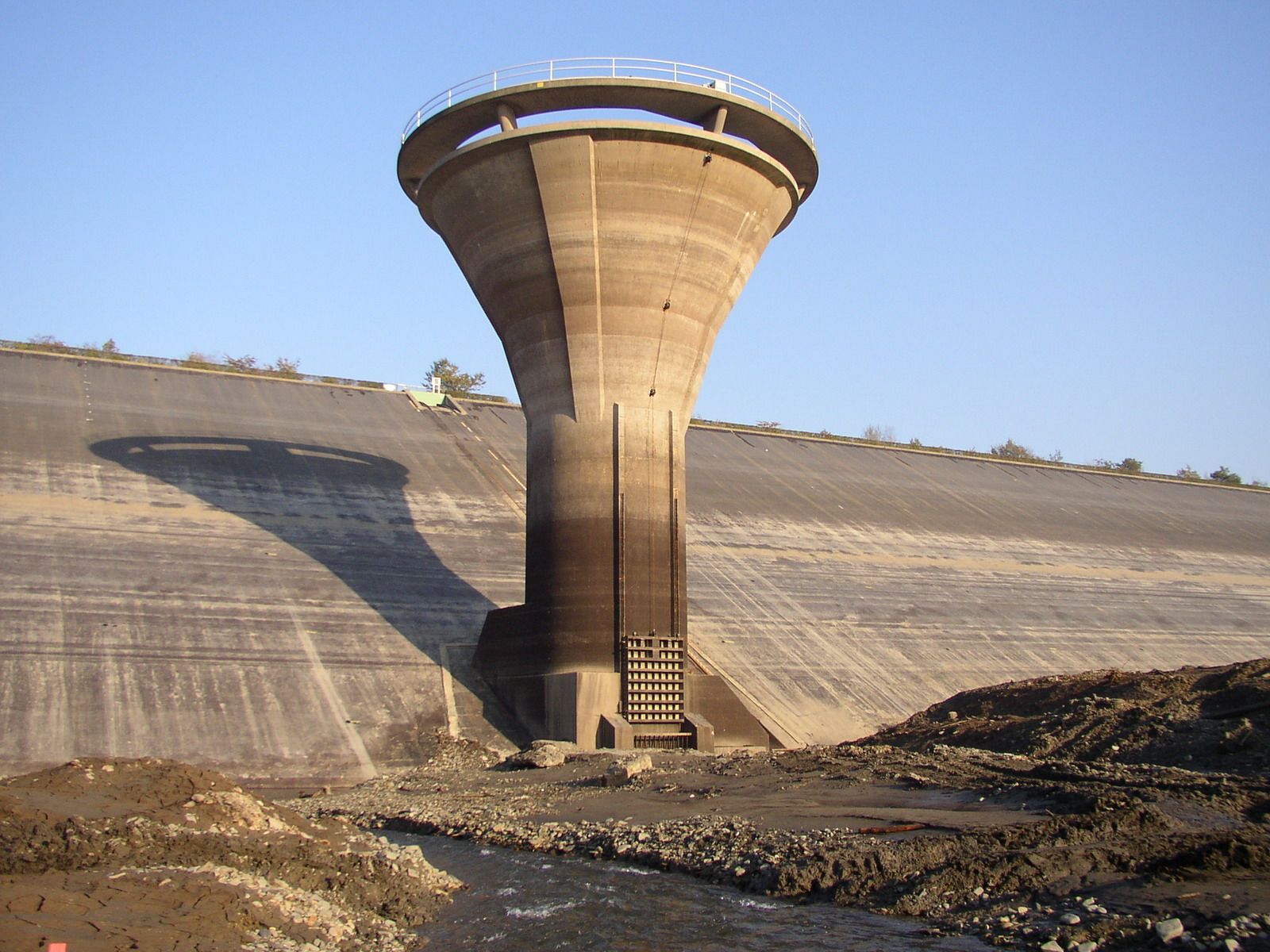
Shaft spillway during renovation work

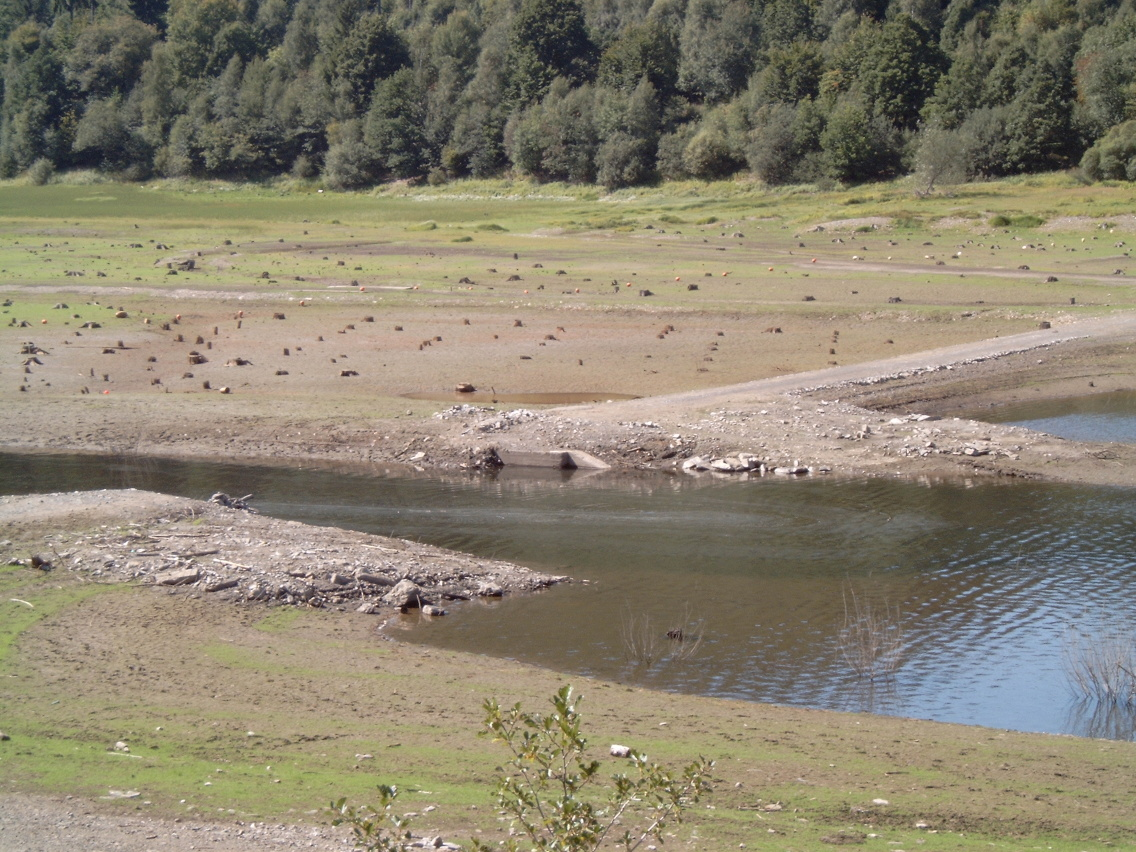
Reservoir at low level

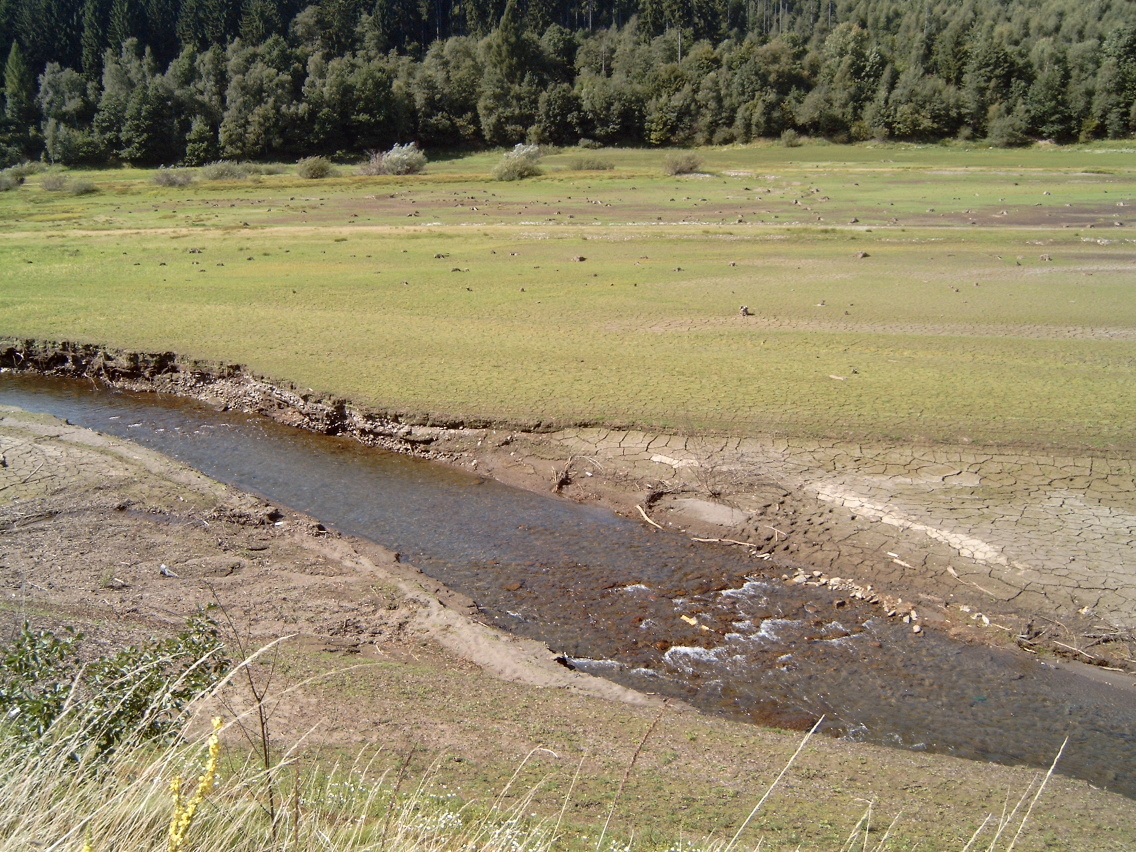
Innerste at low water

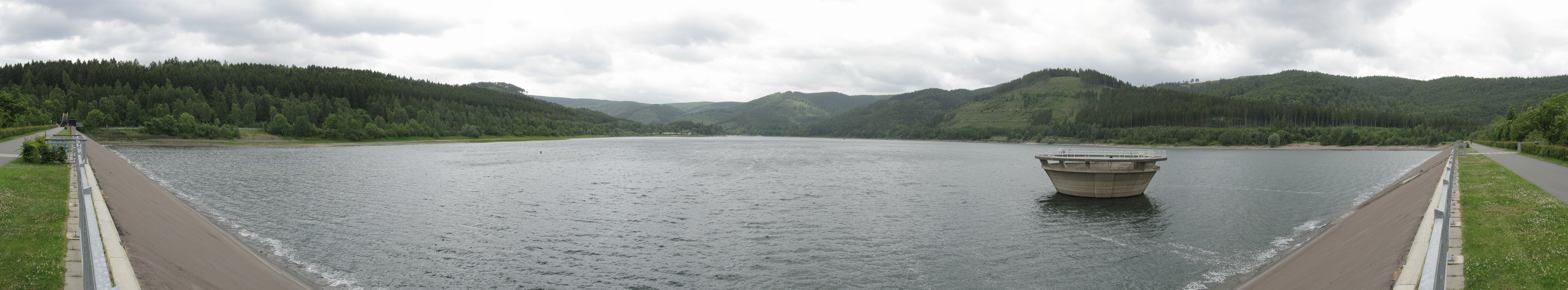
View of the Innerste Dam

== See also ==
- List of dams in the Harz
- List of reservoirs and dams in Germany

== Sources ==
- Peter Franke; Wolfgang Frey (1987), Talsperren in der Bundesrepublik Germany (in German), Berlin: Systemdruck, ISBN 3-926520-00-0
