= Langelsheim–Altenau (Oberharz) railway =

Railway in Germany

Overview
- Native name: Innerstetalbahn
- Line number: 1931
- Locale: Lower Saxony, Germany

Service
- Route number: 204b

Technical
- Line length: 33.4 km (20.8 mi)
- Track gauge: 1,435 mm (4 ft 8 1/2 in) standard gauge

The Langelsheim–Altenau (Oberharz) railway (also known in German as the Innerstetalbahn—"Innerste Valley Railway") was a railway line, that ran through the Upper Harz in Central Germany. It was also called the Upper Harz Railway or Harz Railway. It was built in order to enable the Magdeburg-Halberstadt Railway Company (Magdeburg-Halberstädter Eisenbahngesellschaft or MHE) to access the mines in the Harz mountains.

== The Innerste Valley Railway ==
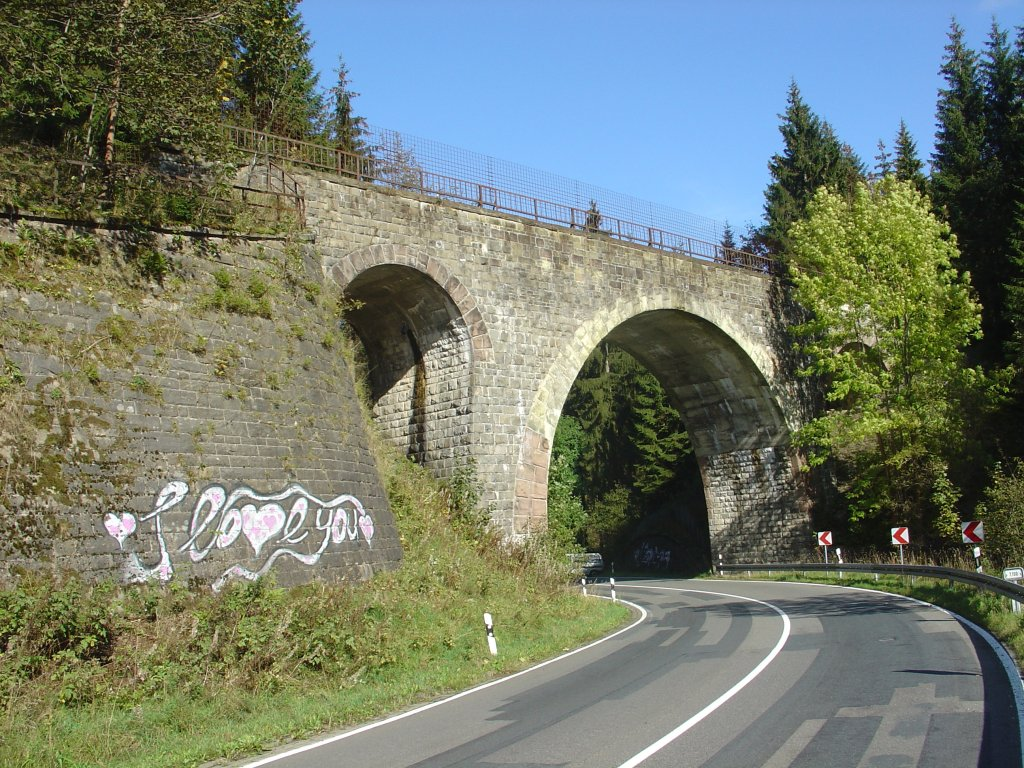
Viaduct over a country road shortly before the terminus

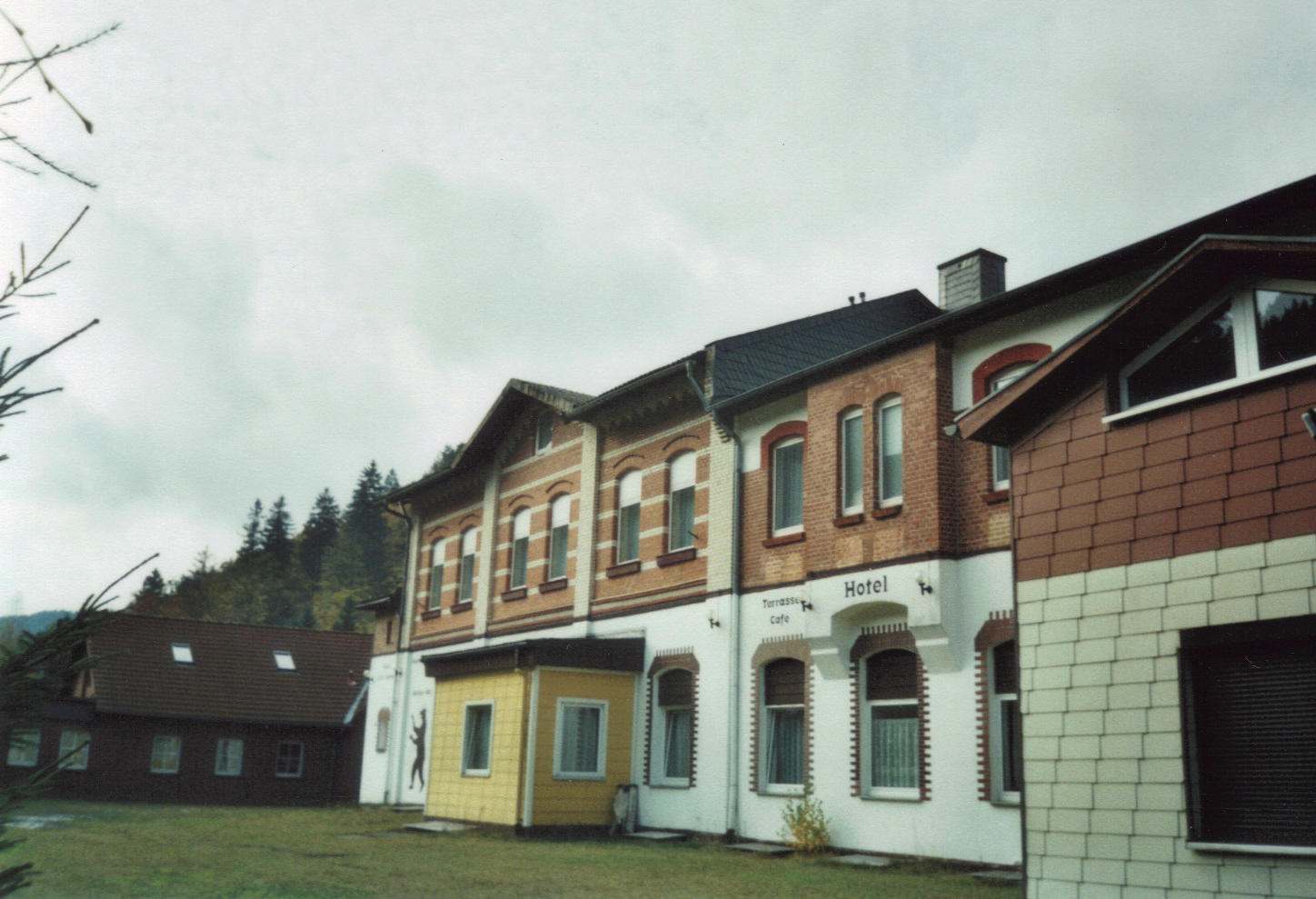
Former railway station in Lautenthal

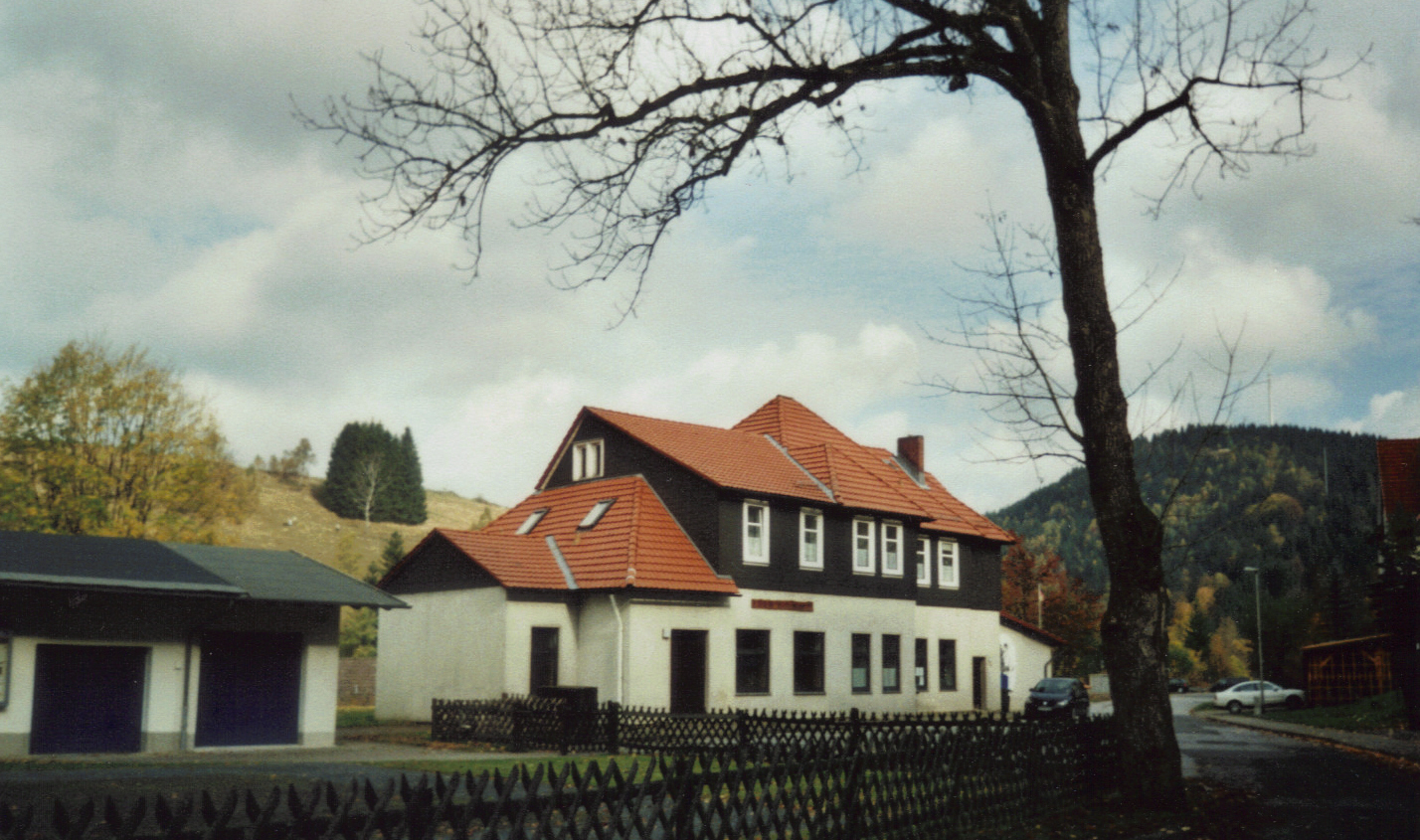
Former railway station in Wildemann

The Innerste Valley Railway was built between 1874 and 1914 and linked several formerly isolated mountain villages in the Upper Harz to the existing railway network in the northern Harz Foreland.

The railway was built in 1875 by the MHE from its marshalling yard at Vienenburg through Grauhof and Langelsheim to Lautenthal. Its original passenger services to Langelsheim on the Vienenburg–Langelsheim railway via Grauhof ended as early as 1884 and all traffic ceased in 1954; a direct line to Goslar being employed instead.

Until the cessation of regular services in 1976 the line branched off at Langelsheim station from the existing Neuekrug-Hahausen–Goslar railway and ran past the halt of Innerstetalsperre (before the construction of the dam there was a halt at Lindthal, now under water) to Lautenthal, from there through the Innerste valley via Wildemann, Silbernaal-Grund halt and Silberhütte station, later renamed Frankenscharrnhütte, to Clausthal-Zellerfeld. From 1914 trains were able to run from there to the terminus of Altenau passing through the station at Clausthal Ost.

== Planning and construction ==
There had been ideas about building such a line, important to the mining industry in the Upper Harz, for a long time. But the narrow Innerste valley posed major problems for a standard gauge railway. In 1874 the Magdeburg-Halberstadt Railway Company began work and bored a tunnel through the Gallenberg in Wildemann, which was finished in July 1875. Services to Clausthal started on 15 October 1877 and, in 1914, the line was extended to Altenau.

== Changes and end ==
In the 100-year history of the Innerste Valley Railway there were many changes. More and more mines were closed, the Second World War took it one stage further and in the mid-1950s mail services between Goslar and Altenau were withdrawn and transferred to the road. At the beginning of the 1960s significant construction work was needed and the line had to be moved when the valley was flooded during the building of the Innerste Dam.

The end was signalled when, in 1967 the mines in Clausthal-Zellerfeld and Lautenthal were closed. Goods traffic reduced dramatically and finally ceased completely. Passenger numbers no longer covered the costs and so the Deutsche Bundesbahn announced the line's closure. The last timetabled trains ran on 29 May 1976. For the line's centenary celebrations of the Langelsheim–Clausthal line special trains ran on 15 and 16 October 1977 hauled by the oil-fired steam locomotive no. 41 096, after when the track was lifted and the railway buildings sold.

It was reported that, as "the revenge of the Innerste Valley Railway", a locomotive employed to lift the track derailed because the section of track in front of it had already been removed.

== Yesterday and today ==
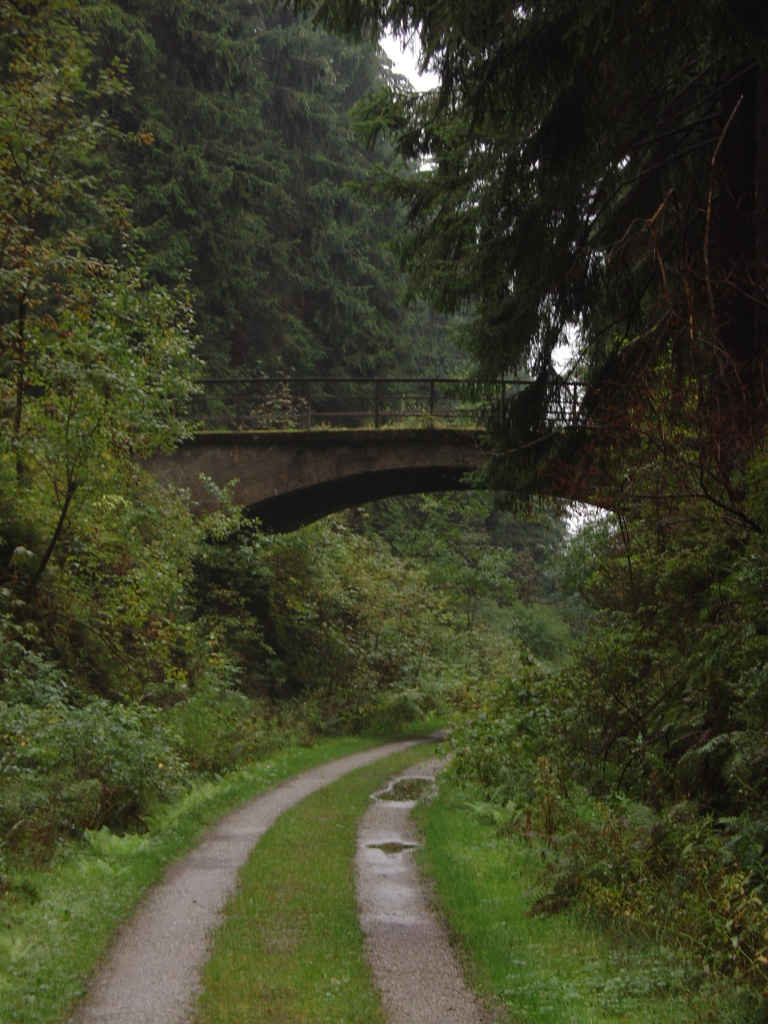
Footpath on the line of the old Innerste Valley Railway

The bridges and viaducts of the Innerste Valley Railway still mark parts of the Upper Harz. From the B 242 between Seesen and Clausthal-Zellerfeld and the old country road between Clausthal-Zellerfeld and Altenau in the Heller valley there are still good views of the impressive structures. All the station buildings and some of the other small buildings remain.

The old trackbed of the Innerste Valley Railway is now a walking and cycle path in summer and a cross-country skiing trail in winter. The cycle path is part of the Lower Saxon long-distance route (RFW No. 5), the Weser-Harz-Heide cycle route, which runs from the Lüneburg Heath over the Harz to Rhumequelle, then via Göttingen to Hann. Münden. The northern portal of the tunnel is blocked with rubble. At the southern end there is a memorial tablet on the right-hand side.
