= Grane (river) =

River in Germany

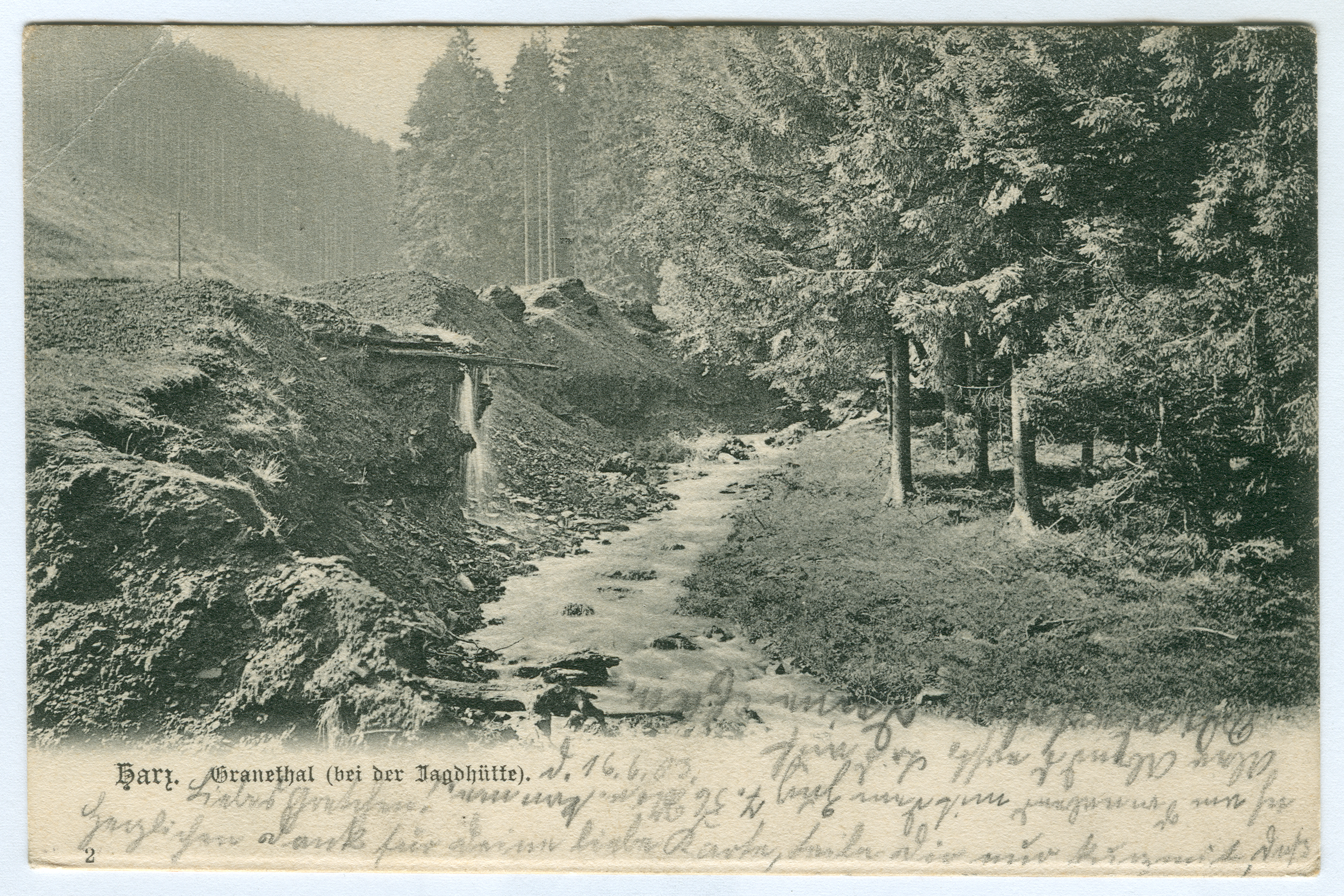

Location
- Country: Germany
- State: Lower Saxony
- District: Goslar

Physical characteristics
- Source
  - location: near Hahnenklee in the Upper Harz
  - elevation: ca. 540 m above sea level (NN)
- Mouth
  - location: near Langelsheim into the Innerste
  - coordinates: 51°56′18″N 10°20′42″E
  - elevation: 197 m above sea level (NN)
- Length: 12.2 km (7.6 mi)
- Basin size: 45 km^{2} (17 sq mi)

Basin features
- Progression: Innerste→ Leine→ Aller→ Weser→ North Sea
- Tributaries
  - left: Varley

The Grane is a river of Lower Saxony, Germany. It is a right tributary of the Innerste river near Goslar.

It rises in the vicinity of Hahnenklee in the Upper Harz and discharges about 12 km (7.5 mi) later into the Innerste near Langelsheim. At Herzog Juliushütte, in Astfeld (a district of Langelsheim) near Goslar, it is controlled by the Grane Dam.

== See also ==
- List of rivers of Lower Saxony
