= List of dams and reservoirs in the Harz =

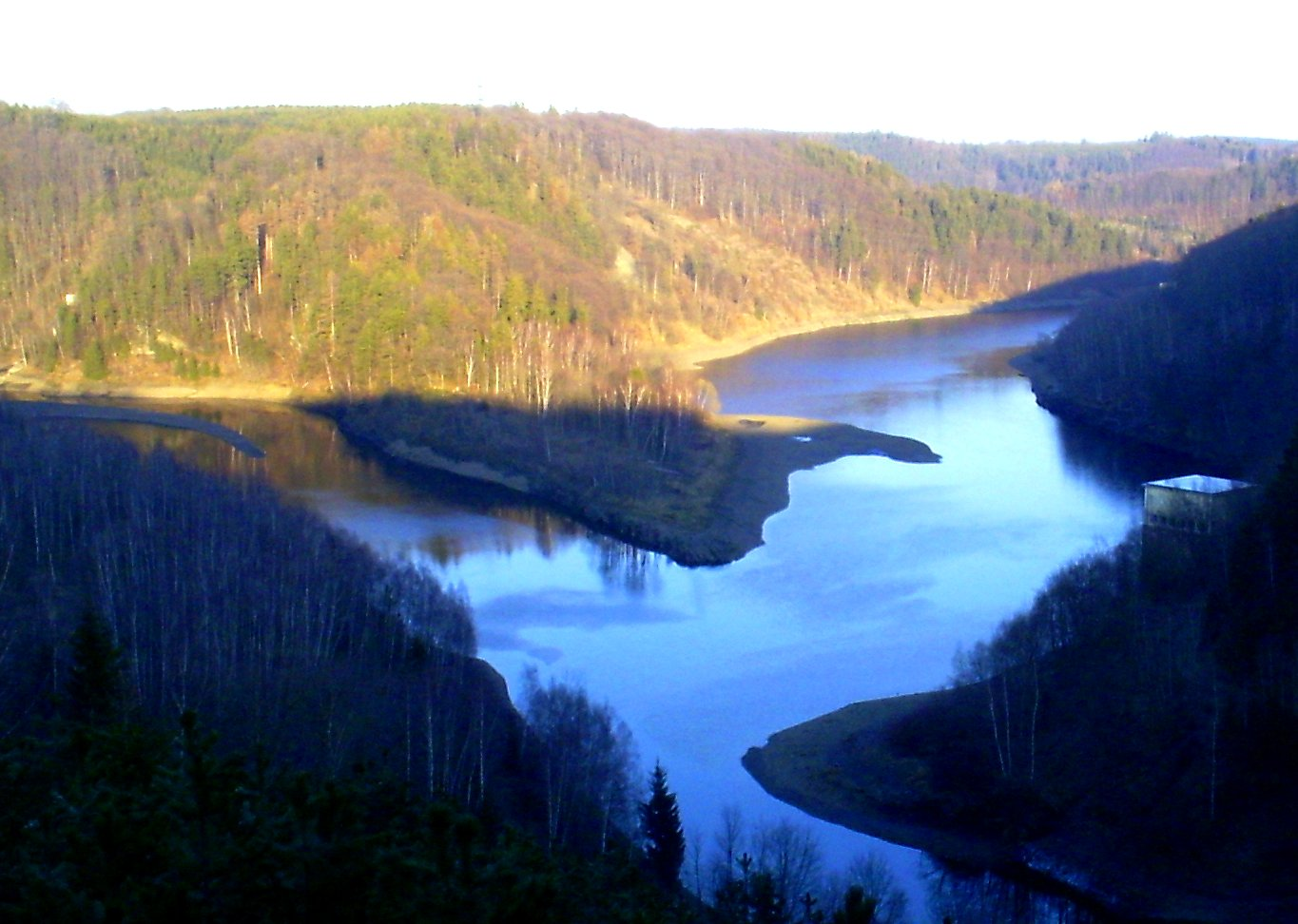
The Wendefurth Reservoir

In the Harz mountains, there is a higher than average number of dams with their associated reservoirs. The reason is that the Harz is one of the regions with the heaviest rainfall in Germany and so its water power was utilised very early on. The first dam (on the Upper Harz Ponds) was built to drive water-powered pumps and stamp mills used in the mines.

At present, the Harz reservoirs provide hydroelectricity, drinking water and flood protection particularly when the snows melt in spring.

The following is a list of dams in the Harz:

- Ecker Dam which impounds the waters of the Ecker
- Grane Dam which impounds the waters of the Grane
- Hassel Auxiliary Dam which impounds the waters of the Hassel, is part of the Rappbode Dam system
- Innerste Dam which impounds the waters of the Innerste
- Kelbra Dam which impounds the waters of the Helme
- Königshütte Dam impounds the waters of both the Warme and Kalte Bode, and is part of the Rappbode Dam system
- Mandelholz Dam (flood control basin) which impounds the waters of the Kalte Bode
- Neustadt Dam (or Nordhausen Dam) which impounds the waters of the Krebsbach
- Oder Dam which impounds the waters of the Oder
- Oderteich which impounds the waters of the Oder
- Oker Dam which impounds the waters of the Oker
- Rappbode Dam which impounds the waters of the Rappbode und Hassel, and is part of the Rappbode Dam system
- Rappbode Auxiliary Dam which impounds the waters of the Rappbode, and is part of the Rappbode Dam system
- Söse Dam which impounds the waters of the Söse
- Wendefurth Dam which impounds the waters of the Bode, and is part of the Rappbode Dam system
- Wippra Dam (or Wipper Dam) which impounds the waters of the Wipper
- Zillierbach Dam which impounds the waters of the Zillierbach

In addition, according to the definition of a dam, 30 of the Upper Harz Ponds (Teiche) also count as dams in the Harz. These elements of the Upper Harz Water Regale belong to the oldest working dams in Germany.

== See also ==
- List of reservoirs and dams in Germany

== Sources ==
- Martin Schmidt: Damn im Harz, Ost- und Westharz, 8. Auflage, Piepersche Druckerei und Verlag GmbH, Clausthal-Zellerfeld, 2005
