= C. F. Theodore Steinway =

German piano maker (1825–1889)

C.F. Theodore Steinway
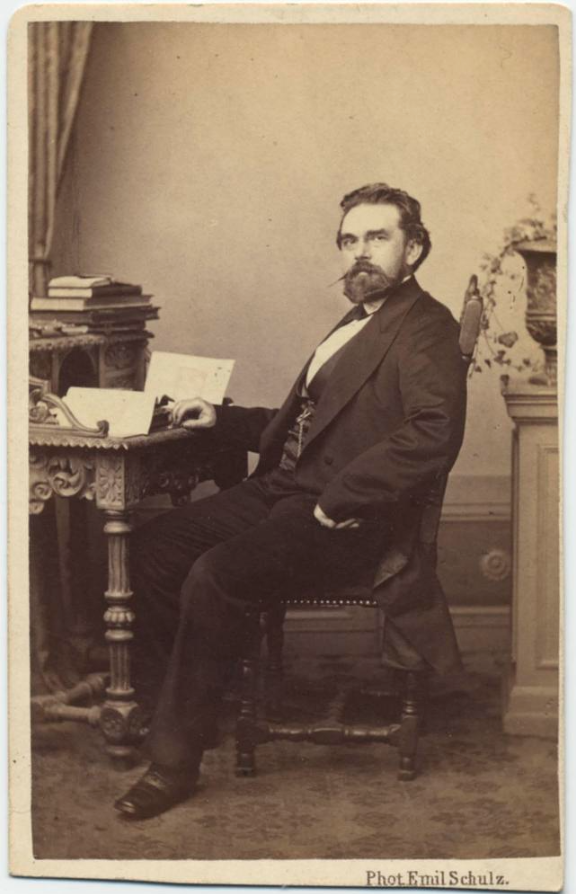
- Steinway in the 1860s
- Born: Christian Friedrich Theodor Steinweg; November 6, 1825; Seesen, Duchy of Brunswick, German Confederation
- Died: March 26, 1889 (aged 63); Braunschweig, German Empire
- Occupation: Piano manufacturer
- Years active: c. 1840s–1889
- Known for: CEO of Steinway & Sons; piano manufacturing patents

Christian Friedrich Theodor Steinweg, anglicized name C.F. Theodore Steinway (November 6, 1825 – March 26, 1889), was a piano maker. He was the eldest son of the famous piano maker and piano company founder, Henry E. Steinway.

== Early life ==
Steinway was born on November 6, 1825 in Seesen.

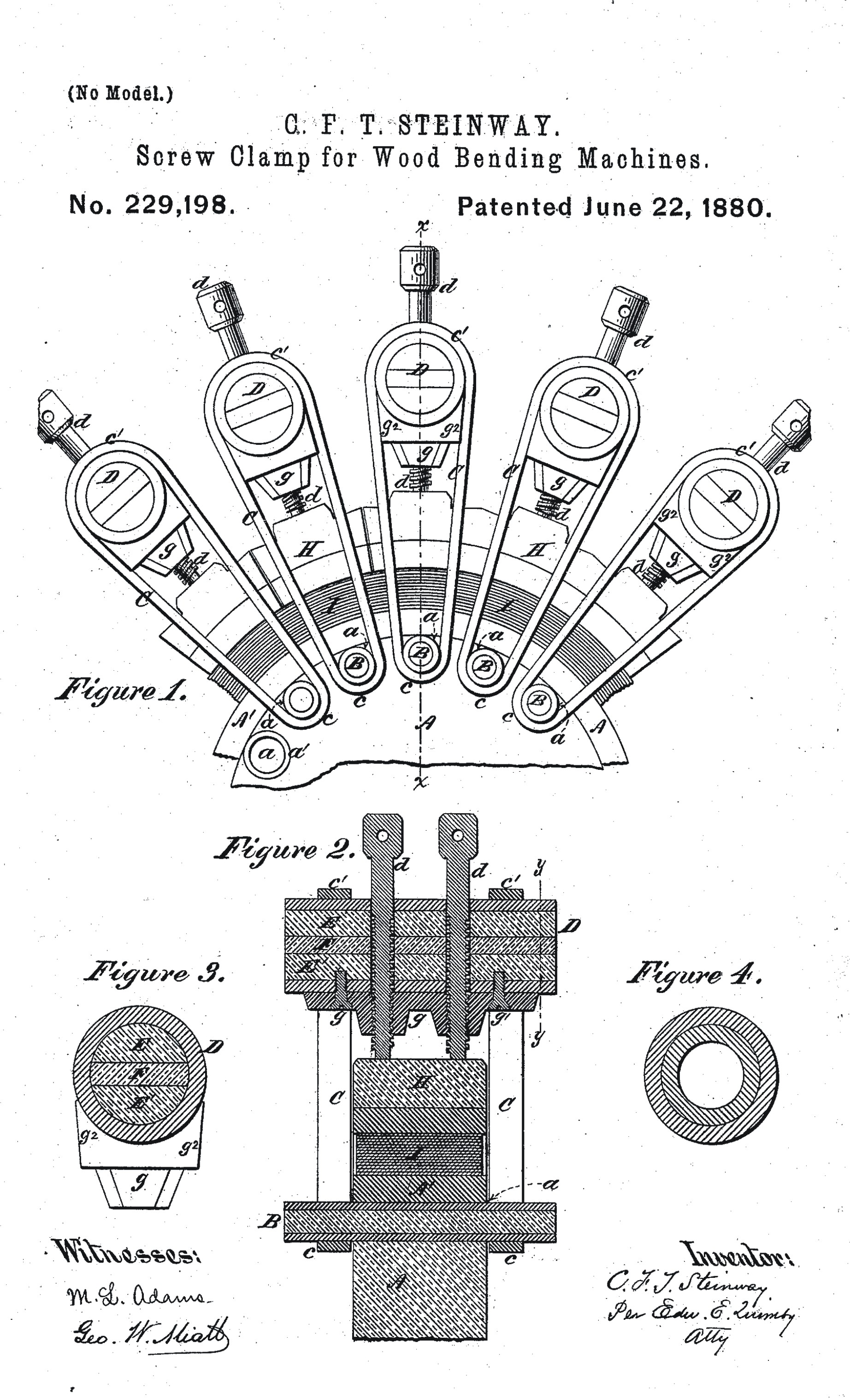
C.F. Theodore Steinway's patented rim bending block

He was 25 years old in 1850 when his parents, brothers and sisters emigrated to New York City.

== Career ==
The piano factory in Seesen, near the Harz mountains, which his father, Henry E. Steinway, had founded in 1835, was transferred into his name. Soon afterwards he moved the factory to Wolfenbüttel. In 1858 the piano maker Friedrich Grotrian, a man with some capital and with experience of piano manufacturing in Saint Petersburg, became a partner in the business. Production was moved to the neighbouring city of Brunswick.

C.F. Theodor Steinweg held many patents for innovations in piano manufacturing, and exchanges of ideas with his family in America led to several more innovations. In 1865 he sold his share of the Brunswick business to Wilhelm Grotrian and the company was renamed as Grotrian-Steinweg, Helfferich, Schulz, formerly Theodor Steinweg. After his brothers Henry Steinway, Jr. and Charles G. Steinway died in 1865, C.F. Theodor Steinweg followed his family to New York, where he called himself Theodore Steinway. In 1880 he returned to Brunswick to live out his last years, and in his will he bequeathed his collection of musical instruments to Brunswick's city museum.

Like Wilhelm Raabe, Ludwig Hänselmann, Konrad Koch, among others, C.F. Theodor Steinweg was a member of Die ehrlichen Kleiderseller zu Braunschweig, also known as Kleiderseller, (in English: Honorable Clothiers' Company of Brunswick), a society to share social, hospitable and musical interests in Brunswick.

=== Influence on Steinway & Sons ===
In 1866, C.F. Theodore Steinway began a cooperative venture with the Mangeot brothers in Nancy, France, who for several years in the late 1860s imported harps and soundboards from Steinway & Sons in New York City, which they installed in their own piano cabinets and sold under the brand name "Mangeot-Steinway", mostly in France and England. This collaboration is not documented in the Steinway archives.

Upon the death of their father, Henry E. Steinway, in 1871, C.F. Theodore Steinway and his younger brother William Steinway took over the management of Steinway & Sons. After the Steinway pianos had won gold medals at the world expositions in London, Paris (1867), and Philadelphia (1876), C.F. Theodore Steinway and William Steinway began planning a European factory, in order to save costs in customs and transportation expenses as well as to maintain connections with the highly sophisticated German piano-making industry. For shipping convenience, they decided upon a location in the major port city of Hamburg in Germany, where they opened a new Steinway & Sons factory in 1880. The Hamburg plant was a separate business unit solely owned by C.F. Theodore Steinway and William Steinway, apart from the other partners of the New York-based Steinway & Sons company.

C.F. Theodore Steinway followed the wish of his father, that he would support the family's business after the two younger brothers had died. He was chief technician of Steinway & Sons until his death and was CEO of the company from 1865 until 1889.

=== Piano development ===
C.F. Theodore Steinway was one of the most innovative inventors and patent holders in the history of the piano: more than 45 patents originate from his development work. The most important development is considered to be the single key mechanism fitted to the newly invented tubular frame built with tubes of brass which contain wooden sticks inside to allow accuracy and a simple screwing, patent gained 1871 for Steinway. Since the Vienna mechanism disappeared at the beginning of the 20th century, all grand pianos have been built using the single key principle, mainly developed by C.F. Theodore Steinway and his younger brothers. With this system it is possible to replace the hammer and also the wippen of a single defective key without either disturbing the neighbouring keys or disassembling any non-defective elements. Also the reinstallation of the elements is supported with high accuracy on the one hand and on the other a quite simple adjustment to perfect working conditions. The precise bearing of the hammer and the whippen on specially profiled brass tubes is still today one of the core elements of Steinway's grand piano mechanism and has not been modified since 1871: a new hammer fits on a tubular fixture of 1871, and vice versa. Theodore's key innovation was the use of a stiff metal fixture with wooden sticks inserted. These permit the continuation of the old and trusted use of wood screws – but provide much higher precision and stability.

The next most important innovation was C.F. Theodore Steinway's rim bending block patent of 1880, which is still used in every grand piano all over the world: long thin strips of sawn wood are glued together and clamped on a wing-shaped fixture with screwed pressing bars. The previous method of casemaking for grands was much more expensive and time-consuming: it demanded the fitting together of wooden corner pieces and in particular the right-hand wall bent by steam into an S curve. The steam bending process required very experienced workers, and a high proportion of the bent pieces had to be rejected. So C.F. Theodore Steinway's invention, which glued together thin saw-cut sheets was very economical: it permitted more cases to be made in a shorter time, with less loss of wood which had already been expensively dried over a period of years.

C.F. Theodore Steinway was the European correspondent in the frequent exchange of letters, and later telegrams, between the Steinway brothers on either side of the Atlantic. This exchange of ideas for better, cheaper and more reliable piano manufacturing led to the final phase of the development of the piano between 1860 and 1885 and a large number of US patents. With the letters and sketches from C.F. Theodore Steinway in Germany, the younger brothers often applied to the US patent office and obtained protection for these ideas. Several further patents, which are not directly connected with C.F. Theodore Steinway's name, nevertheless originate from his work and ideas.

== Personal life ==
He never liked living in the United States, preferring to live in Germany. In 1880, he returned to Germany, first to start the new Hamburg plant, then to live again in Brunswick. As the eldest son, C.F. Theodore Steinway often gave peremptory advice to his much younger brother William Steinway, addressing him in letters and telegrams as "Young man, do this, leave that..."

== Death ==
He died on March 26, 1889 in Braunschweig

== Bibliography ==
=== In English ===
- Susan Goldenberg, Steinway - From Glory to Controversy - The Family - The Business - The Piano, Mosaic Press, Oakville, Ontario, 1996, ISBN 0-88962-607-3
- Richard K. Lieberman, Steinway & Sons, ISBN 0-300-06364-4, Yale University Press, 1995
- Ronald V. Ratcliffe, Steinway, Chronicle Books, San Francisco, 1989, ISBN 0-87701-592-9
- Theodore E. Steinway, Steinway, People and Pianos - A Pictorial History of Steinway & Sons, Classical Music Today, 2005, Amadeus Press, Newark, New Jersey, ISBN 1-57467-112-X

=== In German ===
- Horst-Rüdiger Jarck and Gerhard Schildt (editors): Braunschweigische Landesgeschichte. Jahrtausendrückblick einer Region. Brunswick 2000
- Richard K. Lieberman: Steinway & Sons. Eine Familiengeschichte um Macht und Musik. Kindler, München 1996, ISBN 3-463-40288-2
- Ronald V. Ratcliffe: Steinway & Sons. Propyläen-Verlag, Frankfurt am Main (u.a.) 1992, ISBN 3-549-07192-2
- Dirk Stroschein: Von Steinweg zu Steinway. Eine deutsch-amerikanische Familiensaga (Hörbuch auf Audio-CD). ISBN 3-455-32013-9
