= Königsberg (Goslar) =

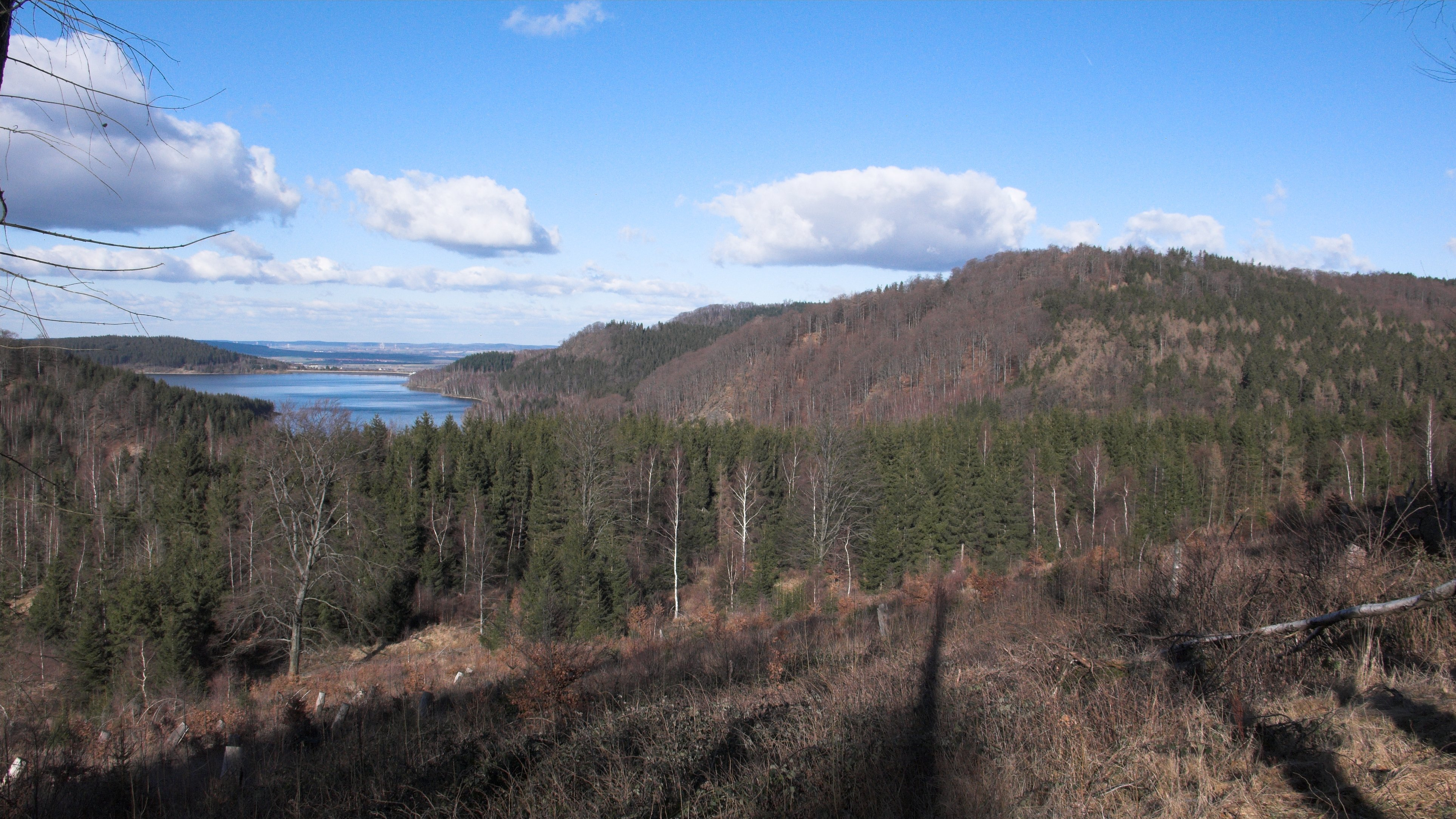
- The Königsberg. On the left: the Grane Reservoir

Highest point
- Elevation: 435 m above sea level (NN) (1,427 ft)
- Coordinates: 51°53′55″N 10°23′23″E

Geography
- Location within Lower Saxony
- Location: Lower Saxony, Germany
- Parent range: Harz Mountains

The 435 m high Königsberg is a hill in the Harz mountains in central Germany, southwest of Goslar between the Grane Reservoir and the Steinberg. On its summit are the ruins of an old tuberculosis convalescent home, later a children's home, the Königsberg Sanatorium.
