= Grane Dam =

Reservoir in Germany

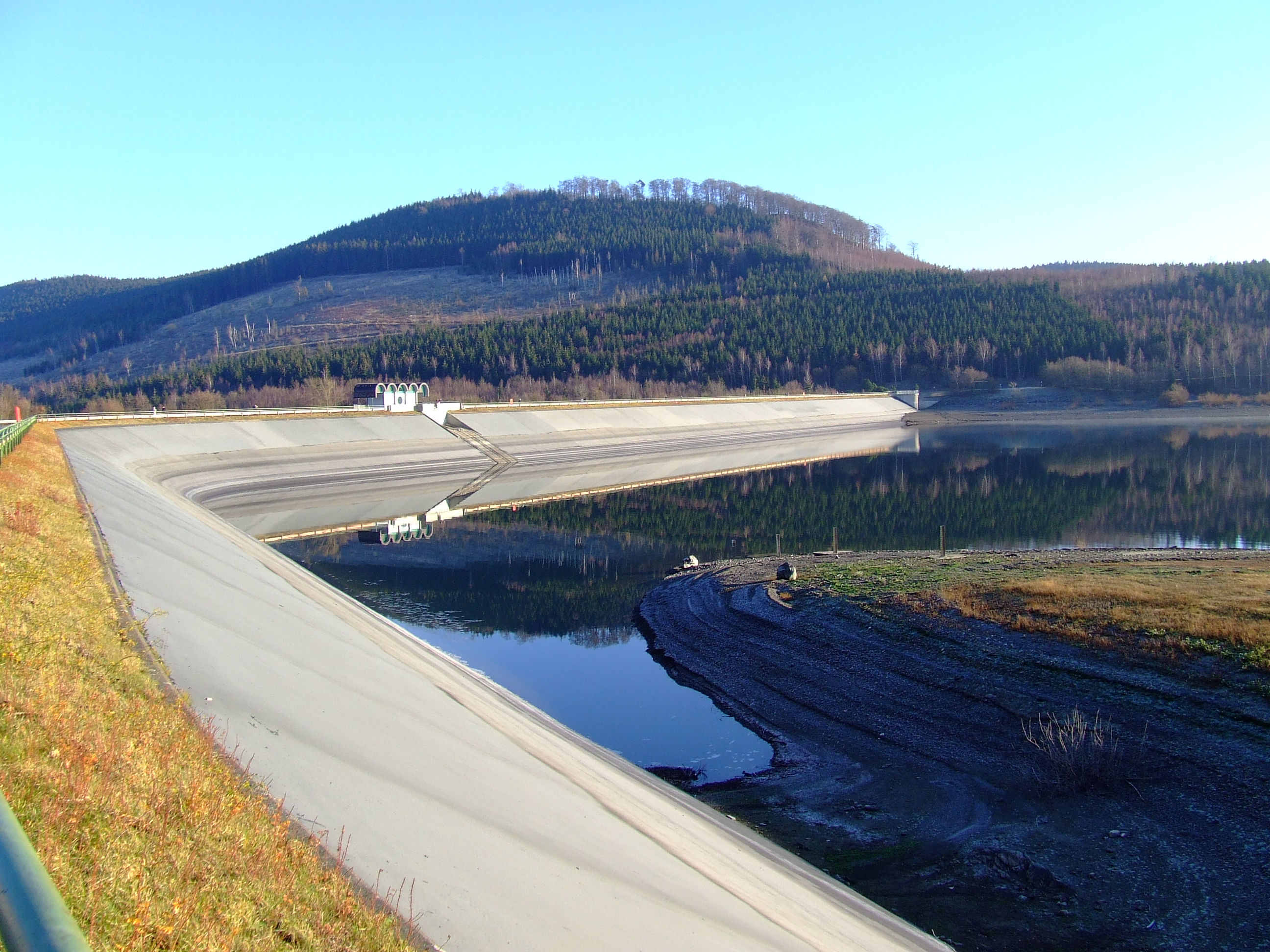

- Location within Lower Saxony
- Country: Germany
- Location: Lower Saxony
- Coordinates: 51°54′32″N 10°22′28″E
- Construction began: 1966
- Opening date: 1969

Dam and spillways
- Height: 67 m (220 ft)
- Length: 600 m (2,000 ft)
- Width (crest): 8 m
- Dam volume: 1.8 million m³
- Spillway capacity: 70 m³/s

Reservoir
- Total capacity: 46.39 million m³
- Catchment area: 22 km²
- Surface area: 219 ha

The Grane Dam (German: Granetalsperre) is a dam above the village of Astfeld/Herzog-Juliushütte in the borough of Langelsheim in the Lower Saxon part of the Harz mountains.

== Dam system ==
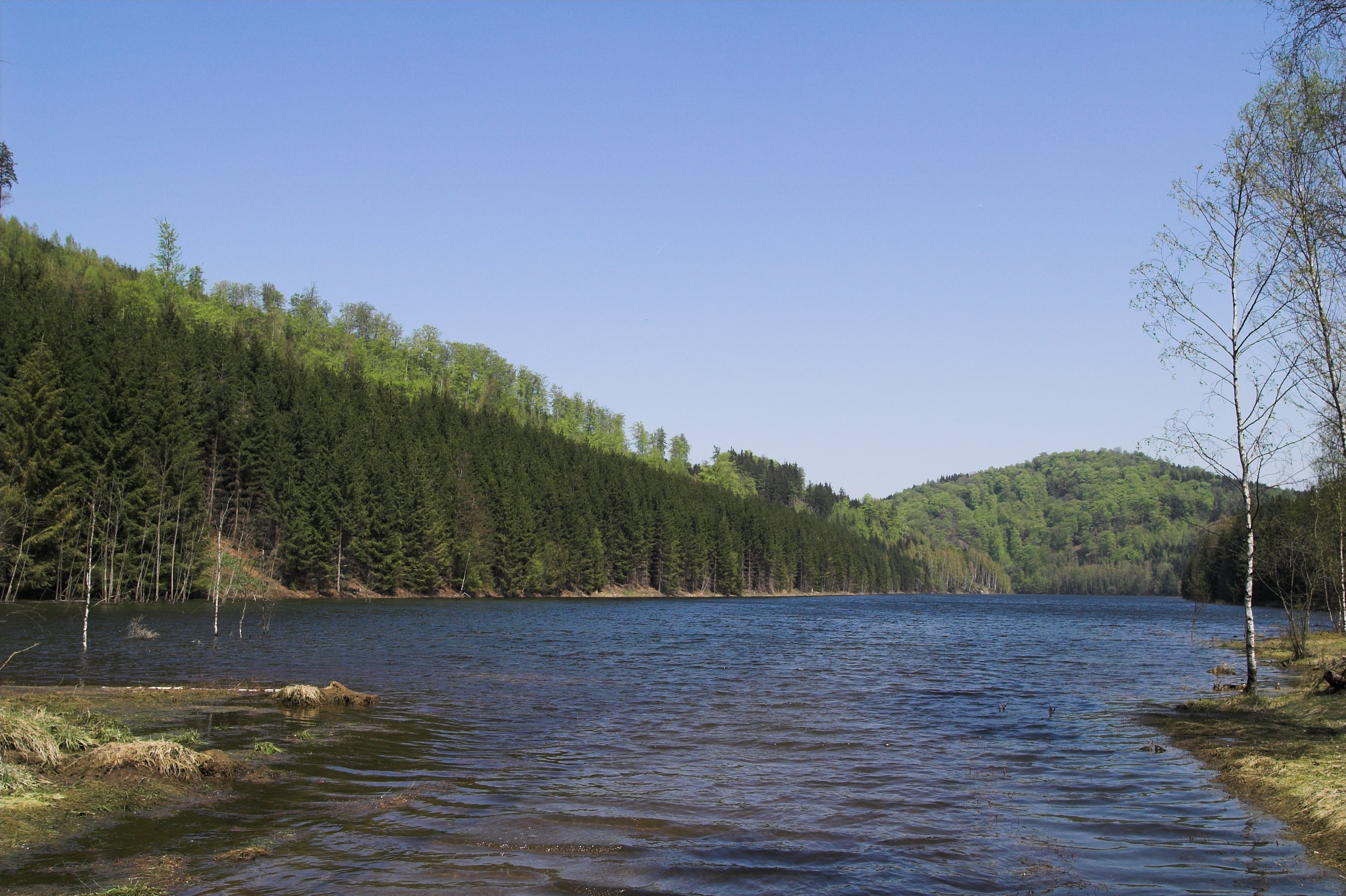
Mouth of the Grane river into the Grane Reservoir. Right: in the background the Königsberg

It is the newest dam in the Harz, built in 1969 in the Grane valley. Because the river Grane itself does not deliver enough water for the 3 km long reservoir, a 7.4 km long diversion channel was built from the Oker river below the Oker Dam. This also collects water from the Gose on the way. A further 4.8 km long diversion runs from the Radau to the Großer Romke and thus into the Oker-Grane Tunnel as well. Likewise there is a 4.6 km long tunnel to the Innerste Dam. The operator of the Grane Dam, as well as its associated diversion systems and waterworks is the Harzwasserwerke.

The barrage is an earth dam with asphaltic concrete lining.

== Reservoir ==
The Grane Reservoir (Granestausee) supplies drinking water, acts as flood protection, water regulation and electricity generation. The hydro-electric power station has a power output of 180 kW. The waterworks for drinking water lies higher up on the northern slope. The water from the reservoir is pumped up into a compensating storage basin of 60,000 m³ capacity, from where it flows to the waterworks. The Grane Dam has an average annual discharge of 55 million m³.

Because the reservoir provides drinking water, water sports are not allowed. Even motor traffic is kept away from it. A track for maintenance was laid around the reservoir, which is also open to walkers and cyclists and is about 17 km long.

There is a checkpoint (no. 110) in the Harzer Wandernadel hiking network by the reservoir known as Granestausee.

== See also ==
- List of dams and reservoirs in Germany
- List of dams and reservoirs in the Harz

== Notes ==
- Peter Franke; Wolfgang Frey (1987), Talsperren in der Bundesrepublik Deutschland (in German), Berlin: Systemdruck, ISBN 3-926520-00-0
