= Goslar (district) =

District in Lower Saxony, Germany

Coordinates: 51°54′38″N 10°25′16″E

- District
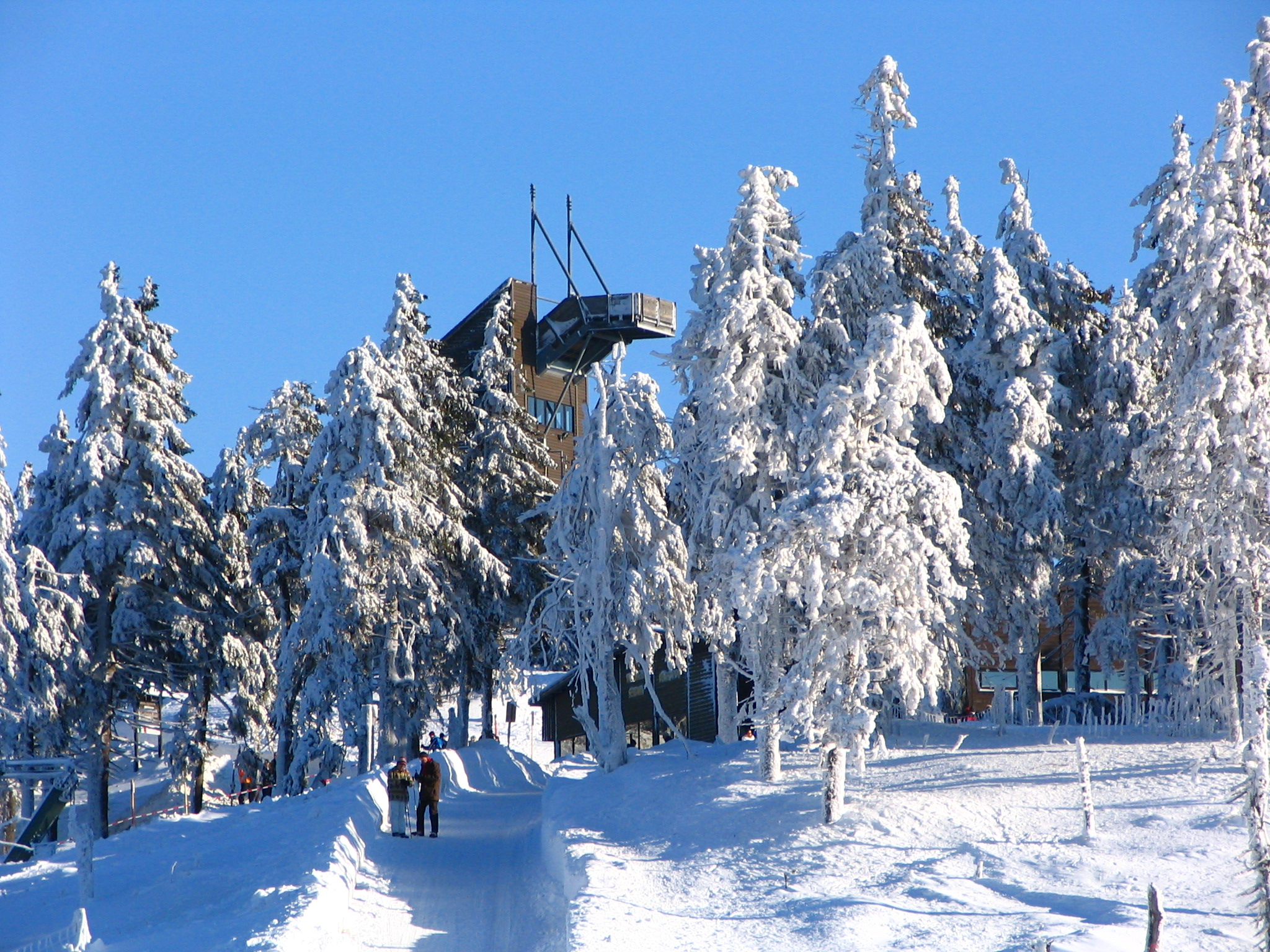

- Flag Coat of arms
- Country: Germany
- State: Lower Saxony
- Capital: Goslar

Government
  - District admin.: Alexander Saipa (SPD)

Area
  - Total: 965.07 km^{2} (372.62 sq mi)

Population (31 December 2024)
  - Total: 126,775
  - Density: 131.36/km^{2} (340.23/sq mi)
- Time zone: UTC+01:00 (CET)
  - Summer (DST): UTC+02:00 (CEST)
- Vehicle registration: GS
- Website: www.landkreis-goslar.de

Goslar (German pronunciation: [ˈɡɔslaʁ]) is a district in Lower Saxony, Germany. It is bounded by (from the south and clockwise) the districts of Göttingen, Northeim, Hildesheim and Wolfenbüttel, the city of Salzgitter, and by the states of Saxony-Anhalt (district of Harz) and Thuringia (Nordhausen).

== History ==
The history of the district is linked with the city of Goslar. The district of Goslar was established in the 19th century by the Prussian government. The city of Goslar did not belong to the district until 1972, when it was eventually incorporated into the district. Langelsheim merged 1 November 2021 with the three municipalities of the Samtgemeinde Lutter am Barenberge, which was abolished.

== Geography ==
The region comprises the northwestern part of the Harz mountains. The Harz National Park is part of this district. The highest peak is the Wurmberg (971 m) near Braunlage, also being the highest elevation of Lower Saxony. Above the small town of Altenau there is the source of the Oker river, which runs through the picturesque Oker valley to leave the Harz at Vienenburg.

== Coat of arms ==
The eagle is the heraldic animal of the city of Goslar, while the lion symbolises the municipality of Schladen. Schladen is not part of the district, but the lords of Schladen ruled over major parts of the district in the early Middle Ages.

== Towns and municipalities ==
The district of Goslar consists of the following towns and municipalities:

Clickable map of towns and municipalities in the district

Towns
1. Bad Harzburg
2. Braunlage
3. Clausthal-Zellerfeld
4. Goslar
5. Langelsheim
6. Seesen
Free municipalities
1. Liebenburg

=== Transport ===
Road

Several federal highways cross the rural district of Goslar. These include the B 4, B 6, B 6n, B 82, B 241, B 242 and B 498. The district roads (Kreisstraßen) are:

No.	Route
K1	B 82 (AS Langelsheim-Ost) - Langelsheim - Jerstedt - Hahndorf - Sudmerberg
K2	Othfresen - Heißum - Dörnten - K1
K3	B 6 - Dörnten - K32
K4	K34 (SZ) - Upen - L500
K11	Klein Mahner - L510
K12	K29 (SZ) - Klein Mahner - Liebenburg
K22	K86 (WF) - Lengde - K34
K27	Vienenburg - Lochtum - K1336 (HZ)
K29	Ostharingen - Kunigunde
K30	Lochtum - Bettingerode - Bündheim
K32	K1 - Goslar
K34	Lengde - Wiedelah - Vienenburg - B 6
K35	Langelsheim - Wolfshagen im Harz - Lautenthal
K36	L516 - Hahnenklee
K37	Zellerfeld - B 242
K38	Clausthal - Altenau
K42	Westerode - Bad Harzburg
K43	Westerode - K46
K46	Harlingerode - Bettingerode - L501
K53	K58 - Bornhausen - B 248
K55	Langelsheim - Astfeld
K56	K58 - Seesen
K57	Seesen - Engelade - B 243/ B 248
K58	K331 (HI) - Rhüden - Bilderlahe - Engelade - Herrhausen
K59	Münchehof - Fürstenhagen
K61	Seesen - B 248
K62	B 64 - Ildehausen
K63	K55 - K35
K65	Münchehof - K21 (GÖ)
K66	K58 - Mechtshausen
K68	B 4/ B 242 (AS Braunlage-Nord) - Braunlage
K70	Oker - Harlingerode - Schlewecke - Bündheim
K71	L517 - Schulenberg im Oberharz - L517

Rail

The territory of the present rural district was joined to the railway network via the Brunswick–Bad Harzburg railway as early as 1840. In 1856 the Brunswick–Kreiensen railway via Seesen was built and, in 1866, the Vienenburg–Goslar railway followed; both branching off the original line. In 1875, the Hildesheim–Goslar railway and the former Halberstadt–Vienenburg railway (to 1945, today it has a new route along the Heudeber-Danstedt–Vienenburg railway) formed part of the link from Hanover via the North Harz to Halle (Saale). Later the lines from Seesen to Herzberg, Seesen to Goslar and Goslar to Bad Harzburg were added.

The railway line via Clausthal-Zellerfeld to Altenau (Innerste Valley Railway) and the railway branches to Braunlage (South Harz Railway) and St. Andreasberg (Oder Valley Railway) have since been dismantled. Even the Derneburg–Seesen branch line is out of service. The former route from Halberstadt via Wasserleben, Vienenburg and Grauhof to Langelsheim served east–west through trains until 1945 but has also since disappeared.

Scheduled buses

Following the widespread closure of railways in the Harz the schedule bus services have gained great importance.
