= Henry E. Steinway =

German-American piano maker (1797–1871)

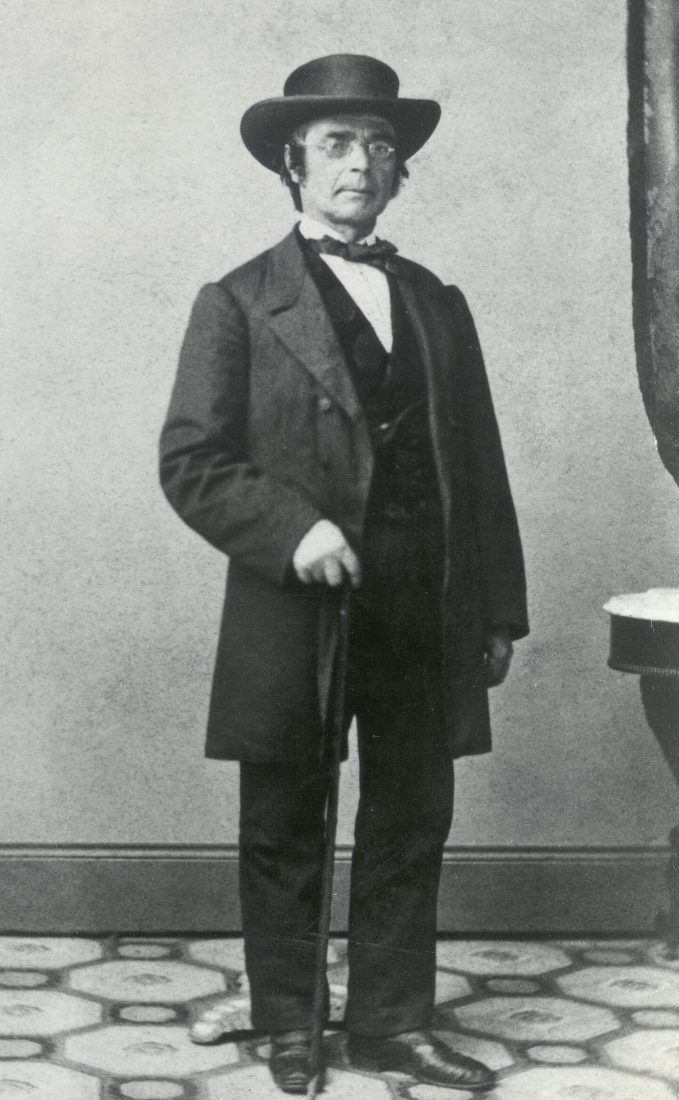
- Born: Heinrich Engelhard Steinweg; February 22, 1797; Wolfshagen im Harz, Brunswick-Wolfenbüttel, Holy Roman Empire
- Died: February 7, 1871 (aged 73); New York City, United States
- Known for: Founding the piano manufacturer Steinway & Sons
- Children: 10, including C.F. Theodore and William

Heinrich Engelhard Steinweg, anglicized name Henry Engelhard Steinway, (February 22, 1797 – February 7, 1871) was a German-American piano maker. He was the founder of the piano company Steinway & Sons.

== Early life ==
Steinway was born Heinrich Engelhard Steinweg of Heinrich Zacharias Steinweg and Rosine Elisabeth Bauerochse in Wolfshagen im Harz, Duchy of Brunswick in the Holy Roman Empire of the German Nation (modern Lower Saxony, Germany). His childhood was marked by many tragedies and twists of fate. He attended public school in his home town. At the age of 8, he was an orphan and thrown upon his own resources, until his father and brothers, once thought to have been killed in action, returned and claimed him once more. Then, at 15, he was orphaned once again, and it was at this time that he joined the German Army. In 1814, he joined the Schwarze Schar, the volunteer corps of Frederick William, Duke of Brunswick-Wolfenbüttel in the war against Napoleon's occupation of parts of Germany but remained in the garrison throughout the Napoleonic War campaign of the Hundred Days in 1815.

== Career ==
He left service on June 23, 1822, and began to work as a carpenter, and later he became an apprentice to an organ builder in the town of Goslar. He soon discovered his love for music and became an organ player in the church.

He started building instruments, though hidden in the kitchen of his house because of the strong rules of the guild. In Braunschweig, he started by building guitars and zithers, and then graduated to pianos, of small proportions initially and gradually increasing in size.

In 1835 he made his first square piano, which he presented to his bride Juliane at their wedding. In 1836 he built his first grand piano in his kitchen in the town of Seesen. This piano was later named the "kitchen piano", and is now on display at the New York Metropolitan Museum of Art with a Steinweg 1836 square piano. In 1839, he exhibited three pianos at the state trade exhibition in Braunschweig, Germany and was awarded a gold medal.

Because of the unstable political climate following the revolutions of 1848 in the German states and the limited economic opportunities for a man working outside a guild, Steinweg decided to leave the country. He emigrated from Braunschweig to New York City in 1850 with five of his sons, but before leaving he gave the company to his son, Christian Friedrich Theodor Steinweg. Later in New York, he anglicized his name to Henry E. Steinway upon advice from friends, who concluded that the German surname Steinweg would be disadvantageous for doing business. In the early 1850s, Steinway and his sons worked for other piano companies until they could establish their own production under the name of Steinway & Sons.

The overstrung scale in a square piano earned the Steinway Piano first prize at the New York Industrial Fair of 1855. In 1862 they gained the first prize in London in competition with the most eminent makers in Europe; and this victory was followed in 1867 by a similar success at the Universal exposition in Paris. According to pianistic giants such as Franz Liszt, Anton Rubinstein, and other high authorities, the Steinways have done more to advance the durability, action, and tone-quality of their instruments than any other makers of Europe or America.

== Personal life and death ==
He married Juliane Thiemer, daughter of Martin Helwig Gottlieb Thiemer, a master glove maker, and Dorothea Julianne von Bierkamp, on May 15, 1825, in Seesen, Germany. He and his wife, Juliane, had ten children:

- C.F. Theodore Steinway (1825–1889)
- Doretta Steinway (1828–1900), married Jacob Ziegler
- Charles H. Steinway (1829–1865)
- Henry Steinway, Jr. (1831–1865)
- Wilhelmina Steinway (1833–1875), married Theodore Vogel
- William Steinway (1835–1896)
- Hermann Steinweg (1836–?), was passenger on steamer Helena Sloman to New York City being 14 yrs old
- Albert Steinway (1840–1877), who served in the 5th New York State Militia during the American Civil War.
- Anna Steinway (1842–1861)
- Juliane Steinway (died in infancy)

Henry Engelhard Steinway died in New York City, United States, on February 7, 1871.
