= Harzwasserwerke =

Harzwasserwerke GmbH
- Company type: Limited liability company (Gesellschaft mit beschränkter Haftung)
- Industry: Drinking water supplier, dam operator, flood protection
- Founded: 1928
- Headquarters: Hildesheim, Lower Saxony
- Key people: Christoph Donner manager; Lars Schmidt, financial manager
- Products: Drinking water Electricity
- Revenue: 53,7 million EUR (2010)
- Number of employees: > 260 (2022)
- Website: www.harzwasserwerke.de

The Harzwasserwerke GmbH (German pronunciation: [ˈhaːɐ̯tsˌvasɐvɛʁkə ˌɡeːʔɛmbeːˈhaː]; English: Harz Water Works Limited) is a major German water company and dam operator based in Hildesheim, located within the German federal state of Lower Saxony.

== History ==
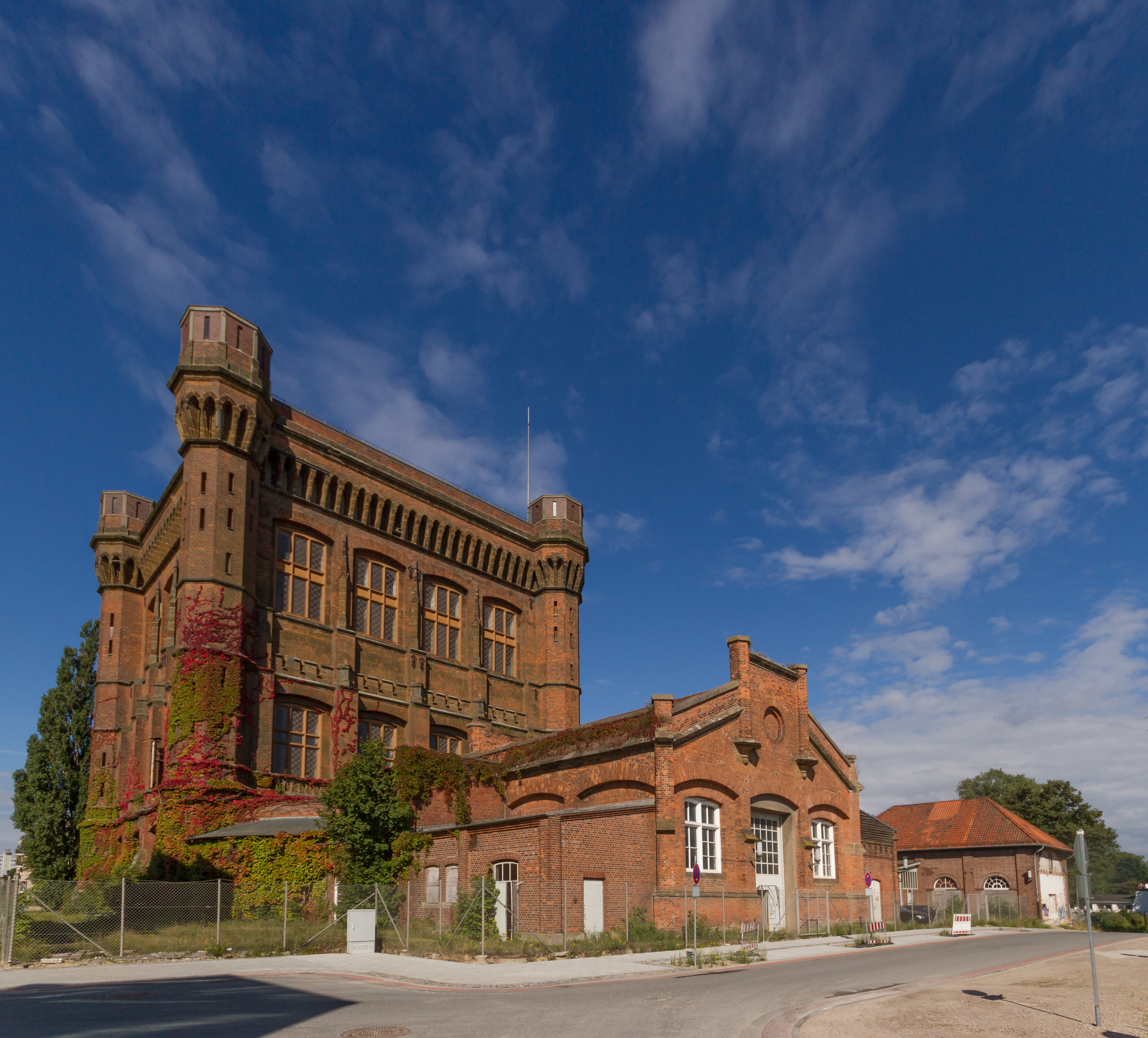
Water pumping station from 1871 at Stadtwerder in Bremen. The facility is operated by SWB and still maintains the Bremen piping net with "Harzwater" by pressure pumps.

Founded in 1928, the Harzwasserwerke were tasked with supplying drinking water, providing electrical power and flood protection. Over the course of the past 75 years, the Harzwasserwerke have expanded to be the biggest water supply company in Lower Saxony and is among the top ten water companies in Germany.

The company utilizes the nearby Harz mountains, a well-known nature reserve and tourist destination in Germany, as a source of high-quality drinking water. Water is impounded in six reservoirs built between 1930 and 1969 in the Lower Saxon part of the Harz mountains; drinking water is prepared in three waterworks and distributed through pipes to large parts of Lower Saxony. The system is supplemented by four groundwater waterworks on the North German plain.

Currently delivering over 94,4 million cubic meters of water per year, the Harzwasserwerke supply a number of municipal utilities as far away as Bremen, Brunswick, Wolfsburg and Hanover, among others. The elevation difference between the Harz mountains and the North German plain makes the terrain very suitable for the production of electrical energy by means of hydropower. Several dams are operated by the company and thus make it an important producer of renewable energy.

Beside the management and administration of flood protection installations, the company is also responsible for the maintenance of the Upper Harz Water Regale, which was designated by the UNESCO as a World Heritage Site in 2010.

Harzwasserwerke employs about 260 employees (2022).

== Privatisation ==
After the founding of the state of Lower Saxony after the Second World War in 1946, the Harzwasserwerke were an institution under public law. They were called "Harzwasserwerke des Landes Niedersachsen" and the state of Lower Saxony was the sole owner. In 1996, the country carried out privatization under the then Prime Minister Gerhard Schröder (SPD). The state sold the facility for DM 220 million to a consortium of energy suppliers and customers of the Harzwasserwerke. Since then, the name has been "Harzwasserwerke GmbH". It is still performing a number of public and communal services that go beyond the portfolio of other water suppliers.

Harzwasserwerke GmbH is managed by Hendrik Rösch and Lars Schmidt as CEOs. The annual turnover nearly doubled from 2010 (40 million EUR) to 2022 to more than 76,8 million EUR (2022).

== See also ==
- List of dams in the Harz
- Dams
- Drinking water
