= Langelsheim =

Place in Lower Saxony, Germany

- Town
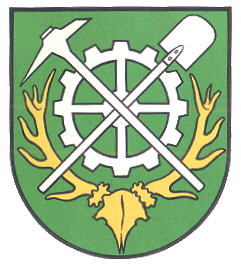
- Coat of arms

- Location of Langelsheim within Goslar district
- Interactive map of Langelsheim
- Location within Germany Location within Lower Saxony
- Coordinates: 51°56′17″N 10°20′06″E
- Country: Germany
- State: Lower Saxony
- District: Goslar
- Subdivisions: 8 Ortschaften

Government
  - Mayor (2021–26): Ingo Henze (SPD)

Area
  - Total: 108.77 km^{2} (42.00 sq mi)
- Elevation: 204 m (669 ft)

Population (2025-12-31)
  - Total: 14,461
  - Density: 132.95/km^{2} (344.34/sq mi)
- Time zone: UTC+01:00 (CET)
  - Summer (DST): UTC+02:00 (CEST)
- Postal codes: 38685
- Dialling codes: 05326
- Vehicle registration: GS
- Website: www.langelsheim.de

Langelsheim (German pronunciation: [ˈlaŋl̩sˌhaɪm]) is a town in the district of Goslar in Lower Saxony, Germany.

== Geography ==
The municipality is situated between the river Innerste and its tributary the river Grane, on the northern edge of the Harz mountain range and the Harz National Park, located about 8 km (5.0 mi) northwest of Goslar.

=== Subdivisions ===
Langelsheim is divided into eight Ortschaften with the following population as of 30 June 2020:

- Astfeld (2,097 inhabitants)
- Bredelem (438 inhabitants)
- Hahausen (765 inhabitants)
- Langelsheim (5,067 inhabitants)
- Lautenthal (1,511 inhabitants)
- Lutter am Barenberge (2,296 inhabitants)
- Wallmoden (907 inhabitants)
- Wolfshagen im Harz (2,192 inhabitants)

== History ==
The place once called Langenizze developed in the 10th century out of a hill fort at the Kahnstein mountain, erected by the Ottonian dynasty. Langelsheim was the site of historic ironworks, first documented in the 13th century, where ore from the Mines of Rammelsberg was smelted. The former municipalities Hahausen, Lutter am Barenberge and Wallmoden are part of Langelsheim since 1 November 2021.

=== Demographics ===
As of 30 June 2020 there were 11,305 inhabitants in Langelsheim.

Population statistics

Year	Inhabitants
1821	5,900
1848	6,873
1871	7,290
1885	8,314
1905	9,707
1925	9,643

Year	Inhabitants
1933	9,829
1939	10,090
1946	15,427
1950	16,321
1956	15,061

Year	Inhabitants
1961	14,243
1968	14,448
1970	14,451
1975	14,929
1980	14,542

Year	Inhabitants
1985	13,967
1990	13,892
1995	13,962
2000	13,619
2005	13,068

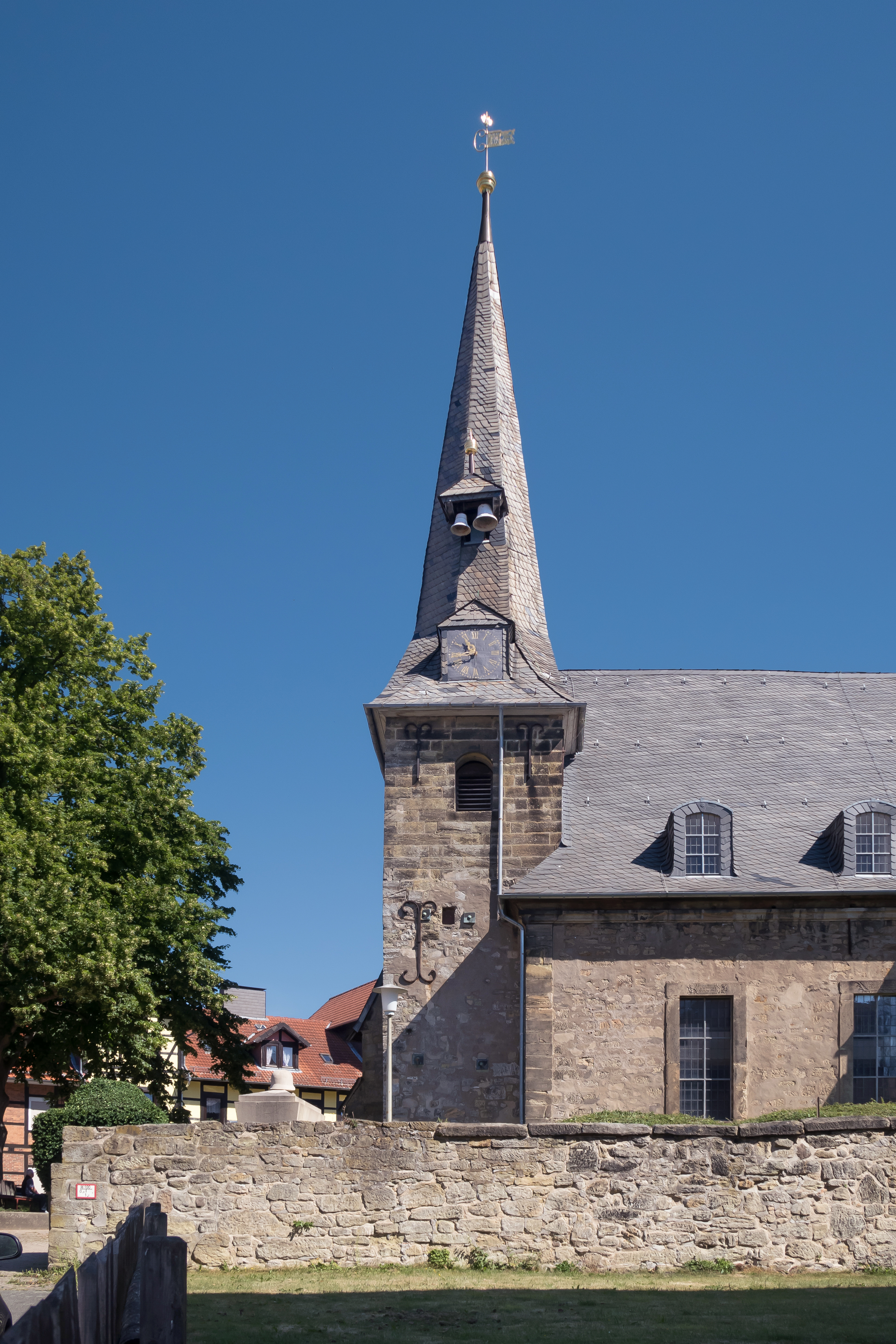
Church: St. Andreaskirche

== Politics ==
=== Town council ===
2006 local elections:

- SPD: 17 seats
- CDU: 9 seats

2016 local elections:

SPD: 12 FDP: 1 WGL: 6 CDU: 7

=== Mayors ===
- Since November 2013: Ingo Henze (SPD)
- 2006-2013: Henning Schrader (SPD)

== International relations ==
Langelsheim is twinned with:

- Emmer-Compascuum, Emmen, Netherlands
- Nieuw-Weerdinge, Emmen, Netherlands
- Roswinkel, Emmen, Netherlands

== Notable people ==
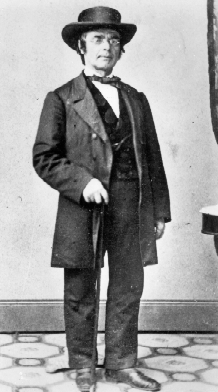
Henry E. Steinway

- Henry E. Steinway, (1797-1871), born Heinrich Engelhard Steinweg in Wolfshagen in Harz, was a piano maker
- Jan Assmann, (born 1938), an Egyptologist
- Hans-Werner Bothe, (born 1952), philosopher and neurosurgeon
- Timo Rose, (born 1977), motion picture director and musician
