= Seesen =

Place in Lower Saxony, Germany

- Town
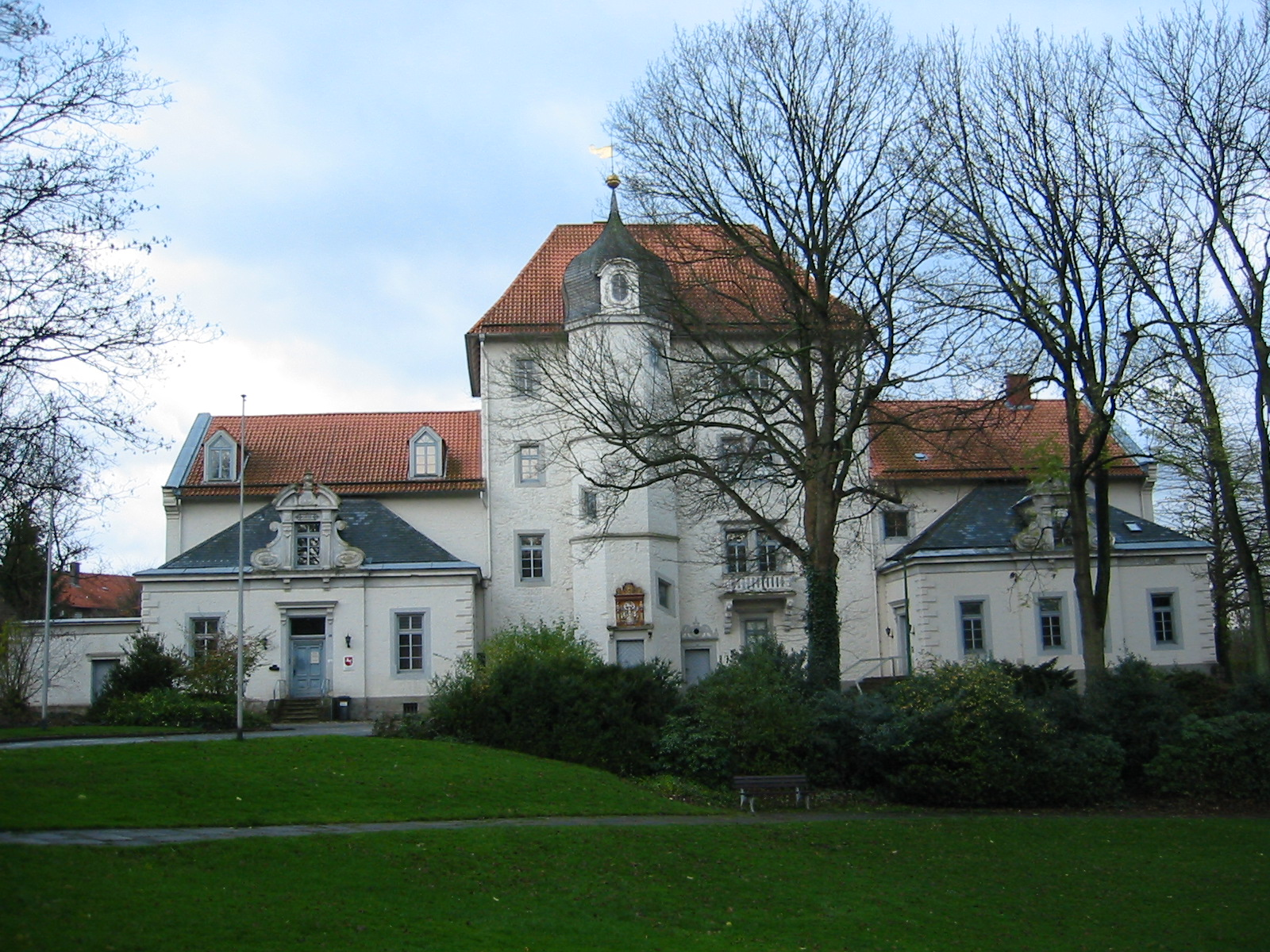
- Sehusa Castle

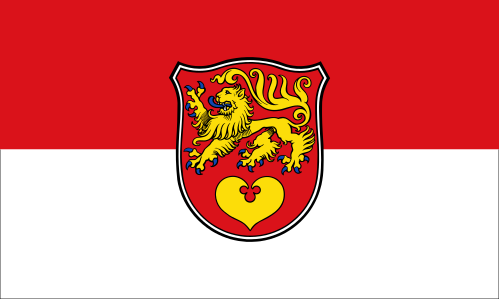
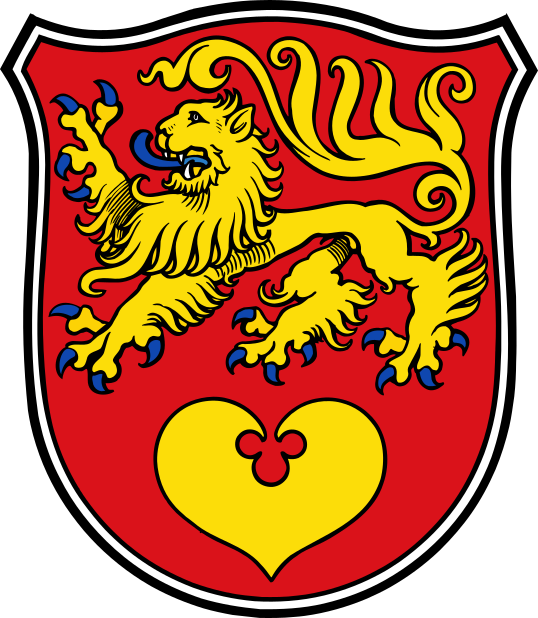
- Flag Coat of arms

- Location of Seesen within Goslar district
- Interactive map of Seesen
- Location within Germany Location within Lower Saxony
- Coordinates: 51°53′35″N 10°10′42″E
- Country: Germany
- State: Lower Saxony
- District: Goslar

Government
  - Mayor (2019–24): Erik Homann (CDU)

Area
  - Total: 102.32 km^{2} (39.51 sq mi)
- Elevation: 205 m (673 ft)

Population (2025-12-31)
  - Total: 18,612
  - Density: 181.90/km^{2} (471.12/sq mi)
- Time zone: UTC+01:00 (CET)
  - Summer (DST): UTC+02:00 (CEST)
- Postal codes: 38723
- Dialling codes: 05381
- Vehicle registration: GS

Seesen (German pronunciation: [ˈzeːzn̩]) is a town and municipality in the district of Goslar, in Lower Saxony, Germany. It is situated on the northwestern edge of the Harz mountain range, approx. 20 km (12 mi) west of Goslar.

== History ==
The Saxon settlement of Sehusa was first mentioned in a 974 AD deed issued by Emperor Otto II and Chancellor Willigis, from 1235 on it belonged to the Welf dukes of Brunswick-Lüneburg who had a castle erected. In 1428 Seesen received town privileges by Duke Otto II the One-Eyed of Brunswick-Göttingen. On 17 July 1810 in Seesen, Israel Jacobson dedicated the first synagogue to use some German in its liturgy, and to employ an organ and a choir during prayer; that dedication date is celebrated in Reform Judaism worldwide as the founding of the denomination. In 1836 Heinrich Engelhard Steinweg (later named Henry E. Steinway) built his first grand piano in his kitchen in Seesen; the instrument is today on display at New York's Metropolitan Museum of Art.

== Politics ==
Seats in the municipal assembly (Stadtrat) as of 2006 elections:

- Christian Democratic Union (CDU): 17
- Social Democratic Party of Germany (SPD): 15
- Free Democratic Party (FDP): 2

== Twin towns – sister cities ==
Seesen is twinned with:

- Wantage, England, United Kingdom (1978)
- Thale, Germany (1990)
- Carpentras, France (1993)
- Montecorvino Rovella, Italy (2006)

== Notable people ==
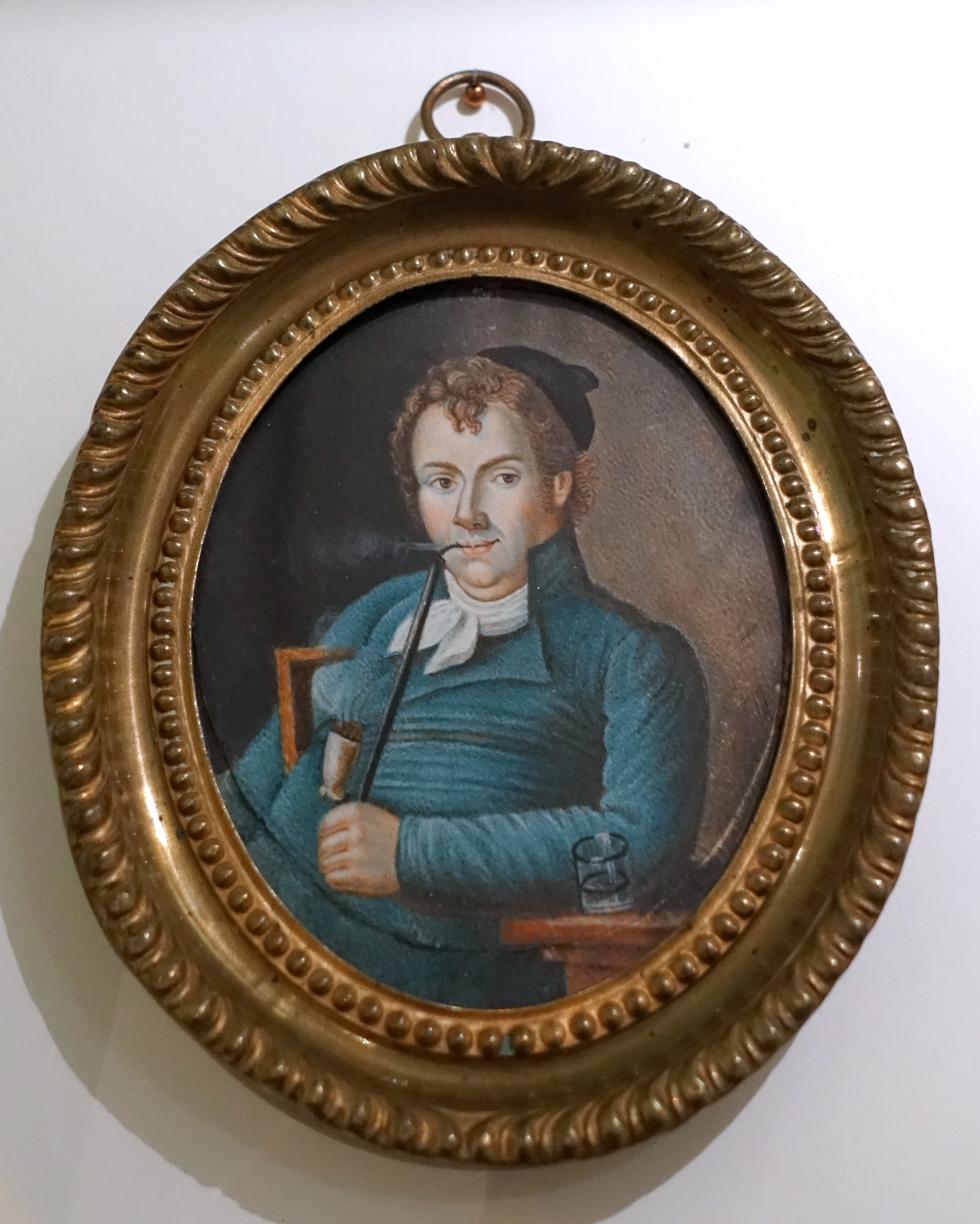
Israel Jacobson, 1810

- Israel Jacobson (1768–1828), established the first Haskalah interdenominational school locally in 1801
- Louis Spohr (1784–1859), composer, violinist and conductor; grew up locally
- Konstantin Bernhard von Voigts-Rhetz (1809–1877), Prussian general
- Wilhelm Busch (1832–1908), German humorist, poet, illustrator and painter, died at the Mechtshausen vicarage
- C. F. Theodore Steinway (1825–1889), a piano maker, eldest son of Steinway & Sons founder, Henry E. Steinway.
- William Steinway (1835–1896), piano manufacturer, helped develop Astoria, Queens, New York.
- Emil Wohlwill (1835–1912), chemist, invented the Wohlwill process
- Wilhelm Fitzenhagen (1848–1890), cellist, composer and university teacher
- Franziska Busch (born 1985), ice hockey forward and former alternate captain of the Germany women's national ice hockey team

== See also ==
- Metropolitan region Hannover-Braunschweig-Göttingen-Wolfsburg
