= Trillkebach =

River in Germany

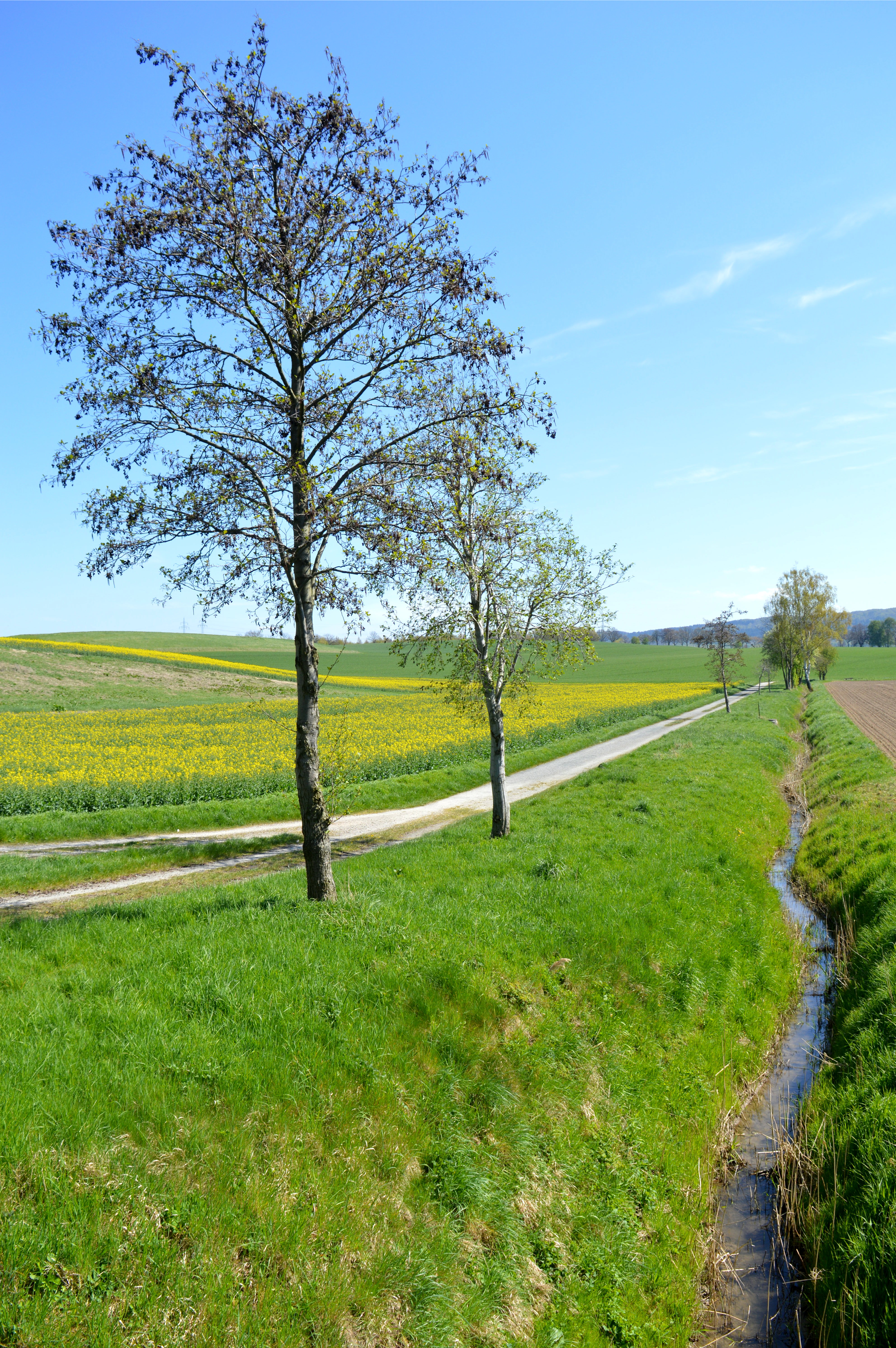

Location
- Country: Germany
- State: Lower Saxony

Physical characteristics
- Mouth
  - location: Kupferstrang
  - coordinates: 52.1476°N 9.9325°E

Basin features
- Progression: Kupferstrang→ Innerste→ Leine→ Aller→ Weser→ North Sea

Trillkebach is a small river of Lower Saxony, Germany. It flows into the Kupferstrang in Hildesheim.

== See also ==
- List of rivers of Lower Saxony
