= Zellbach =

River in Germany

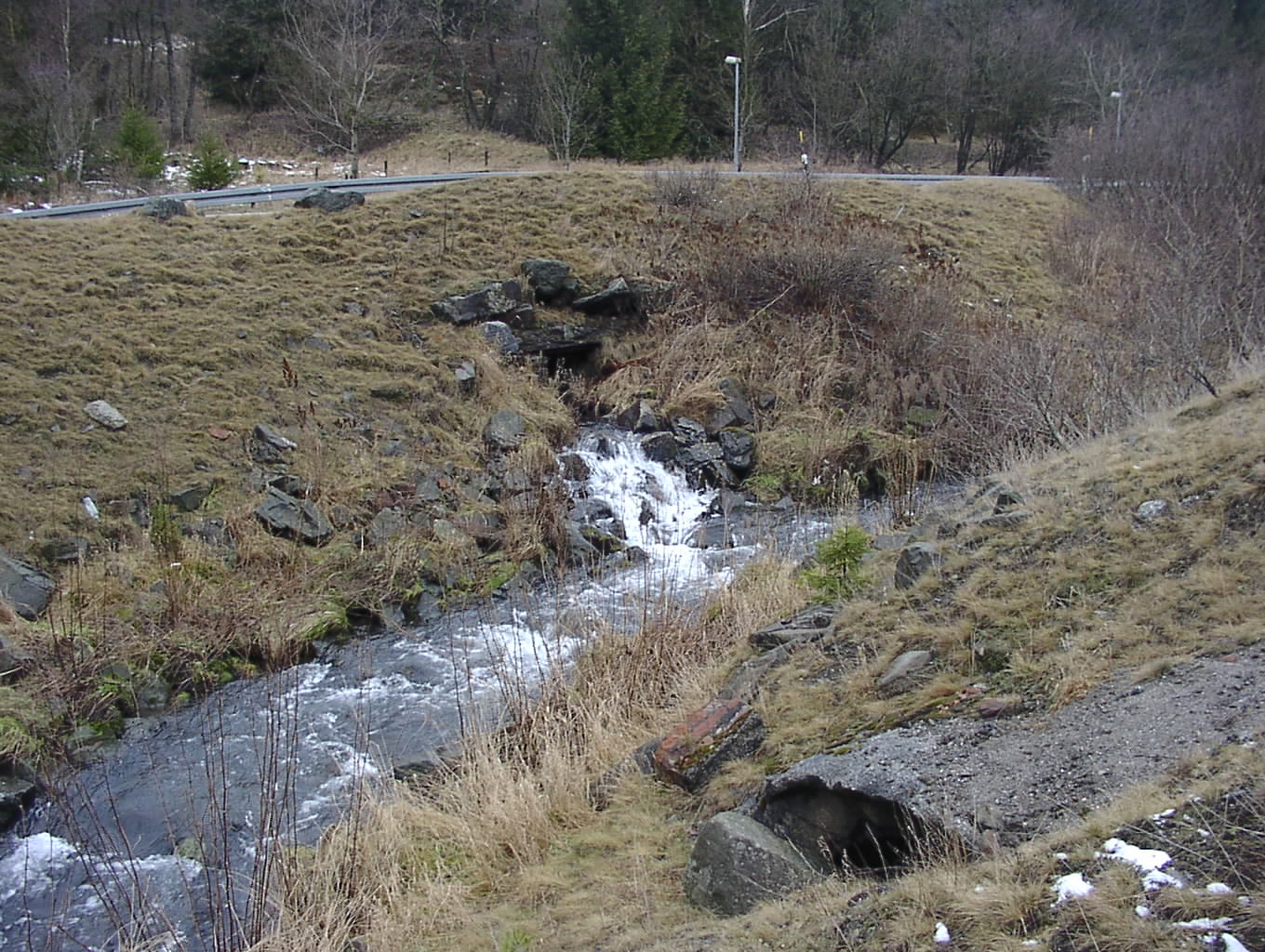

- Mouth of the Zellbach

Location
- Country: Germany
- State: Lower Saxony

Physical characteristics
- Mouth
  - location: Innerste
  - coordinates: 51°48′10″N 10°17′48″E

Basin features
- Progression: Innerste→ Leine→ Aller→ Weser→ North Sea

The Zellbach (German pronunciation: [ˈtsɛlbax]) is a stream that runs for 8.1 km (5.0 miles) through the Harz Mountains of Lower Saxony, Germany. It flows into the Innerste west of Clausthal-Zellerfeld.

== Course ==
The Zellbach begins in a spring around 605 metres (1985 feet) above sea level, near federal road B242. Along with other, unnamed streams, the Zellbach is dammed near its source to form the Hirschler Pond. From here, water passes consecutively through the Upper, Middle, and Lower Peacock Ponds.

From these reservoirs, the Zellbach continues northwest into Clausthal-Zellerfeld, where it briefly forms the border between the formerly independent towns of Clausthal and Zellerfeld.

After passing the old railway station, part of the stream feeds into the Eulenspiegler Pond, with the outlet continuing southwest; here, several small tributaries feed into it from other local retention ponds.

Subsequently, the stream flows southwest through the Zellerfeld valley, bordered on one side by district road K37, until it feeds into the Innerste.

== See also ==
- List of rivers of Lower Saxony
