= Marienburg Castle (Hildesheim) =

Water castle with settlement in Hildesheim, Lower Saxony, Germany

Coordinates: 52°6′52″N 9°58′56″E

Marienburg Castle (Burg Marienburg) is a well-preserved Romanesque castle in Hildesheim, a city in Lower Saxony, Germany.

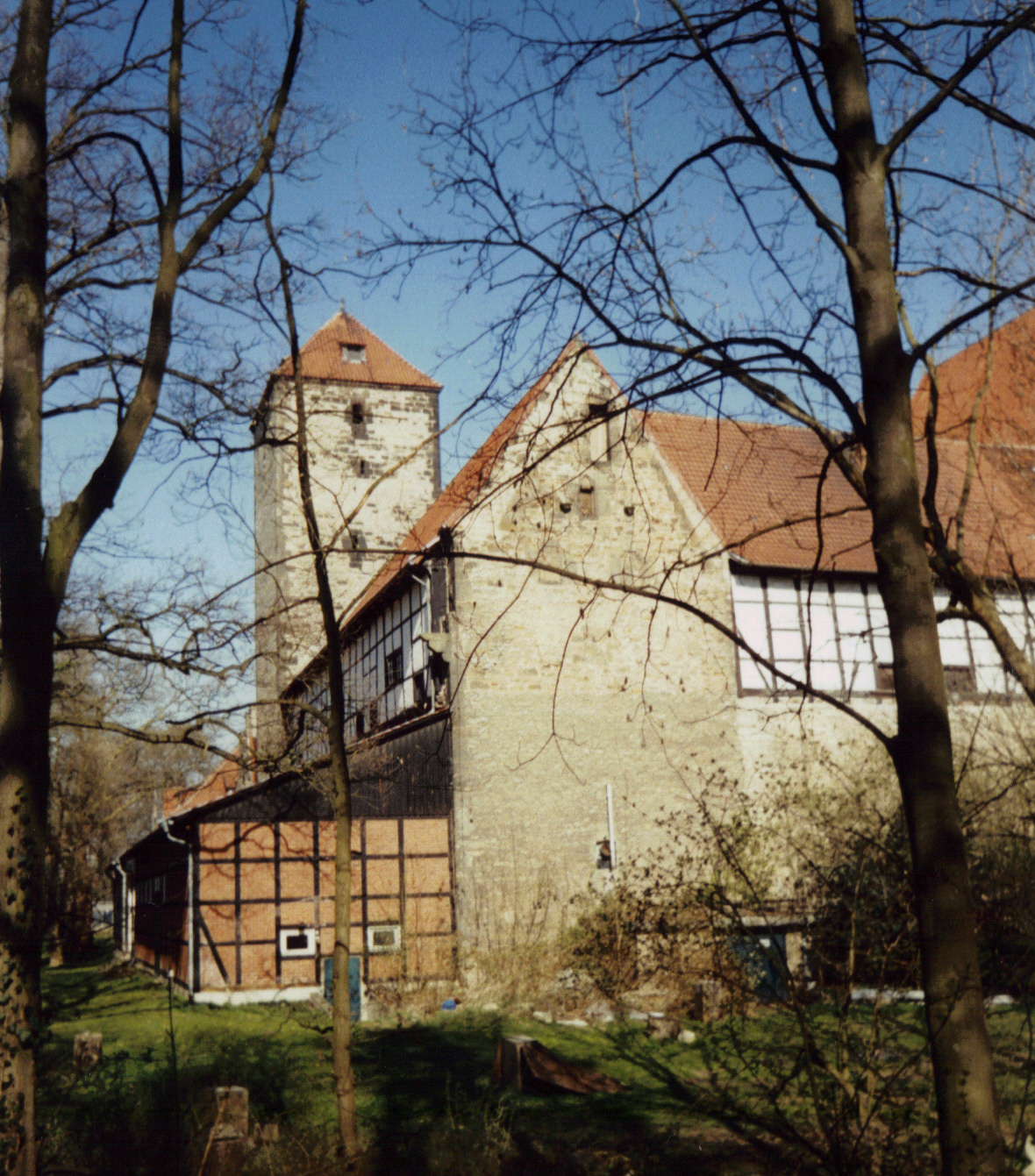
General view from the West.

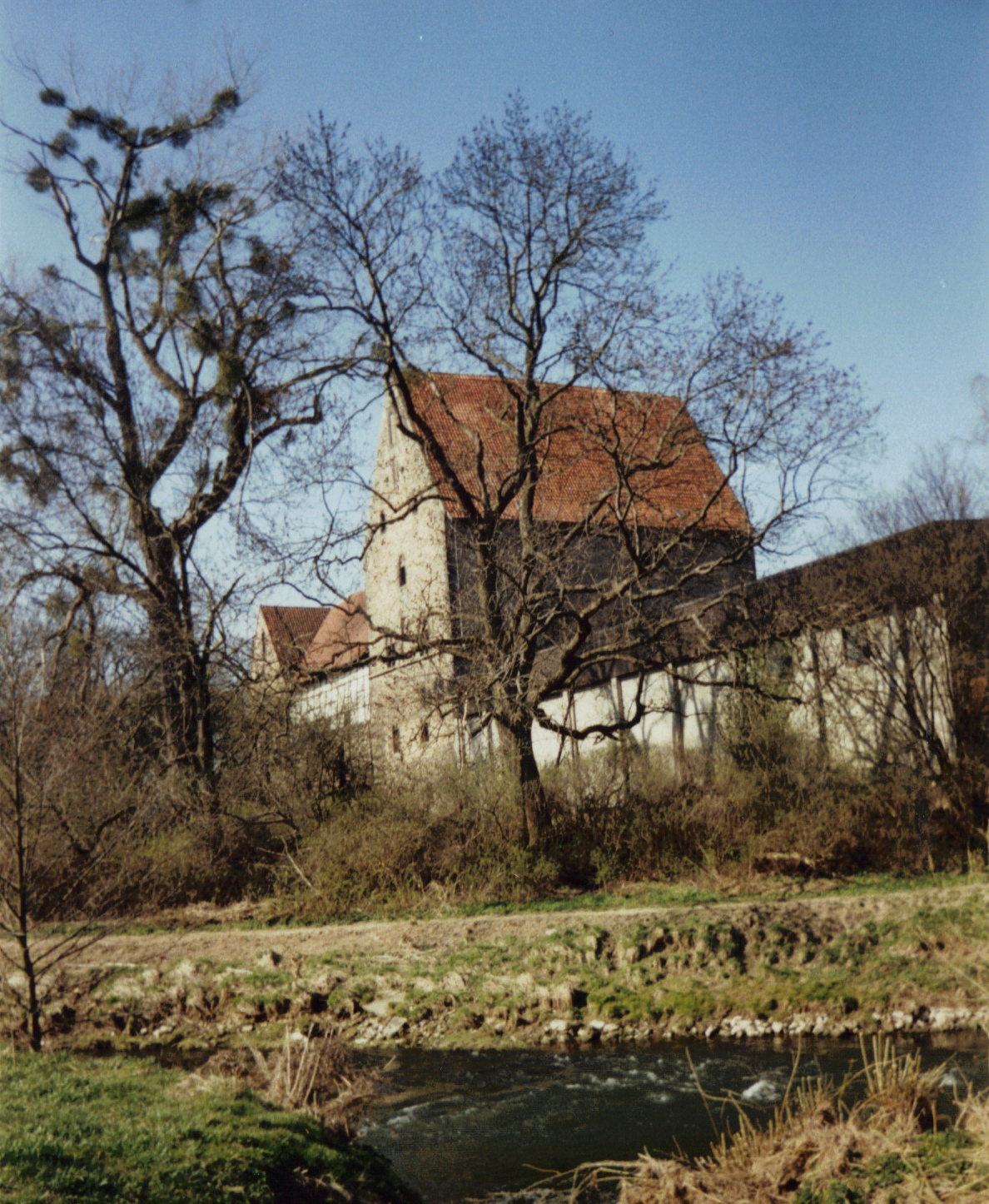
General view from the east with the Romanesque palas and River Innerste.

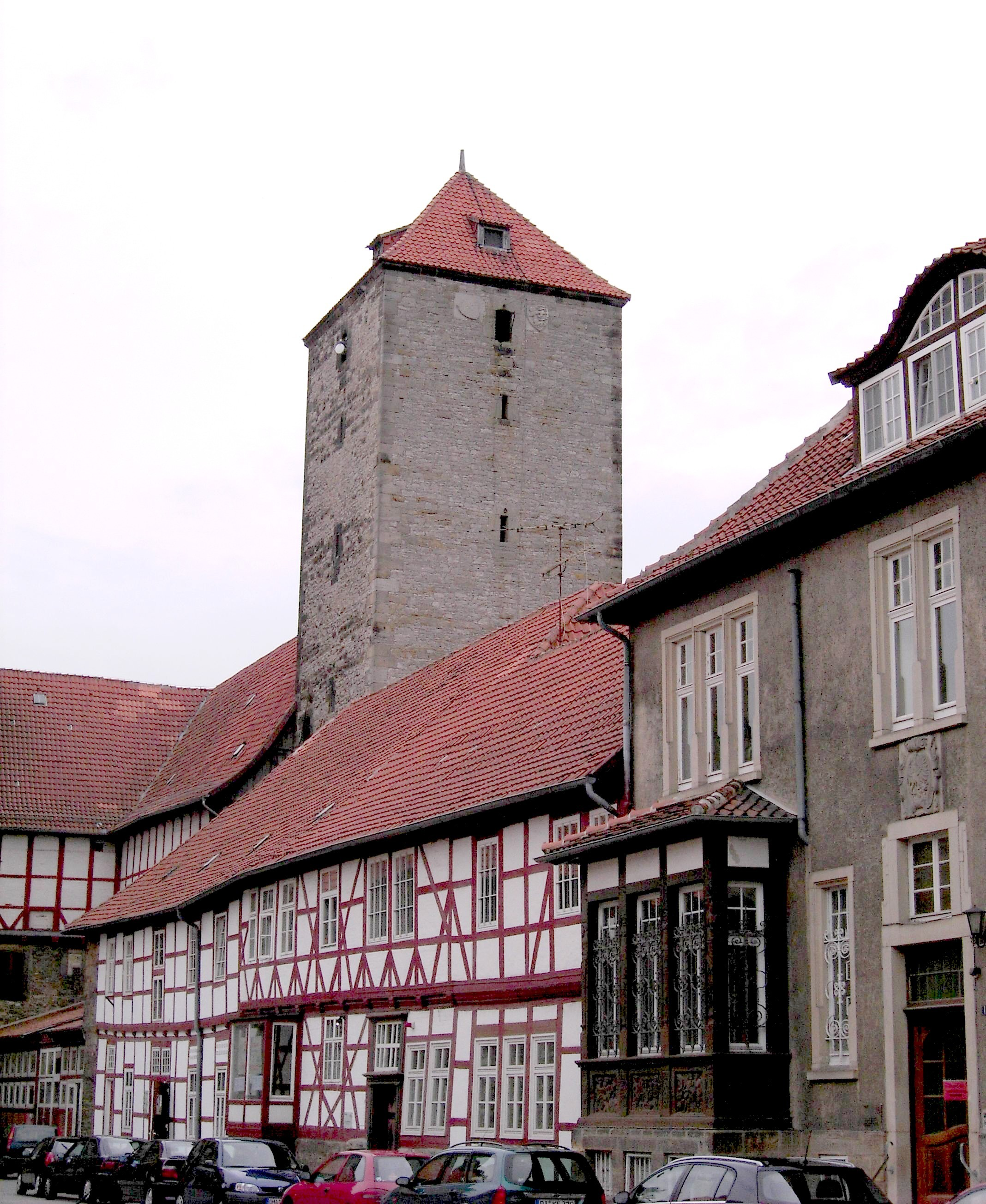
Inner court.

== History ==
Hildesheim was founded as the seat of the Bishopric of Hildesheim in 815. The settlement around the cathedral of Hildesheim was ruled by the clergy for four centuries and it quickly developed into a town which was awarded market rights by King Otto III in 983. The town grew further and obtained city rights in 1249, developing into a very wealthy merchant city. At the end of the 13th century, Hildesheim had about 5,000 inhabitants and was one of the biggest and richest cities in the North of Germany. The citizens gained more and more self-confidence and did not want to be governed by the bishop any longer. As the bishop did not want to reside in the rebellious and dangerous city any longer, he ordered Steuerwald Castle in the North of the city to be built as a new residence. When the castle was completed in 1313, he left Hildesheim. But just one castle proved insufficient to intimidate and to control the citizens. Bishop Henry III, his successor (1331–1363) who also resided in Steuerwald Castle, ordered another castle to be built in the South of Hildesheim, hoping to increase his power by controlling the city from two directions.

According to the orders given by Henry III, Marienburg Castle was built in 1346–1349 on the river Innerste in the South of Hildesheim, about 6 kilometres from the city The castle was built with three aisles, a high bergfried and very thick walls (2 metres) in a strategically advantageous location on the trade route linking Hildesheim to Goslar, another important merchant city. Marienburg Castle was surrounded by two moats. In addition, a part of the castle was protected by the river. In the Thirty Years' War, Marienburg Castle was conquered in 1623, but only the upper floors of the Southern and Eastern aisles suffered some damage. They were rebuilt in half-timbered style in 1663. After the Thirty Years' War, Marienburg Castle was only used for residential purposes and lost its strategic importance. The castle was remodelled several times. During the secularization, the Catholic Church lost the castle which was transformed into a government-owned domain.

The small village of Marienburg developed around the castle on the river Innerste. At the beginning of the 20th century it had 195 inhabitants, most of whom were working in the domain. In 1974, the village of Marienburg became a part of the city of Hildesheim.

During World War II, Marienburg Castle remained undamaged. From 1945 to 1981, some of the buildings served as a canning factory. Vegetables were grown on the fields surrounding the castle, and the two medieval moats were levelled as the space was needed for the cultivation. From 1949 to 1991, the deep vaulted cellar of the castle was used as an ice-cream factory. Since 1993, the castle has been used by the University of Hildesheim. In 2005, the City of Hildesheim bought Marienburg Castle for €12.1 million.

== Architecture ==
Over the centuries, Marienburg Castle has been remodelled and enlarged several times, but the oldest parts dating from the High Middle Ages are well-preserved. Some buildings were added in the 15th, 17th and 18th century. One of the barns was transformed into a lecture hall.

The castle keep, reaching a height of 31 metres, has an almost quadrate basis measuring 8.55 x 8.75 metres, firing slits and a tent roof.

The Romanesque palas is comparatively large, reaching a height of 29.5 metres. Its basis measures 21.06 x 12.65 metres and the walls are extraordinarily thick, reaching a thickness of up to 2.35 metres. Inside the building, which has four floors, there is a great hall on the third floor reaching a height of 5 metres. On the fourth floor, there is a bay window with a medieval toilet (sic). The palace has small romanesque windows and gothic lancet windows as well. As the building was used as a grain store for several centuries, it has hardly been remodelled.

The representative Tenant's House was built in the 18th century in Baroque style.

== Marienburg Castle today ==
As Marienburg Castle is used by the University of Hildesheim, only a part of the castle is open to the public. Some buildings are just being renovated. There is a footpath around the castle with a scenic view giving a good impression of the whole complex. Sometimes special exhibitions are held in the castle.
