= Lautenthal =

Formerly free mining town in Langelsheim, Germany

Coordinates: 51°52′13″N 10°17′27″E

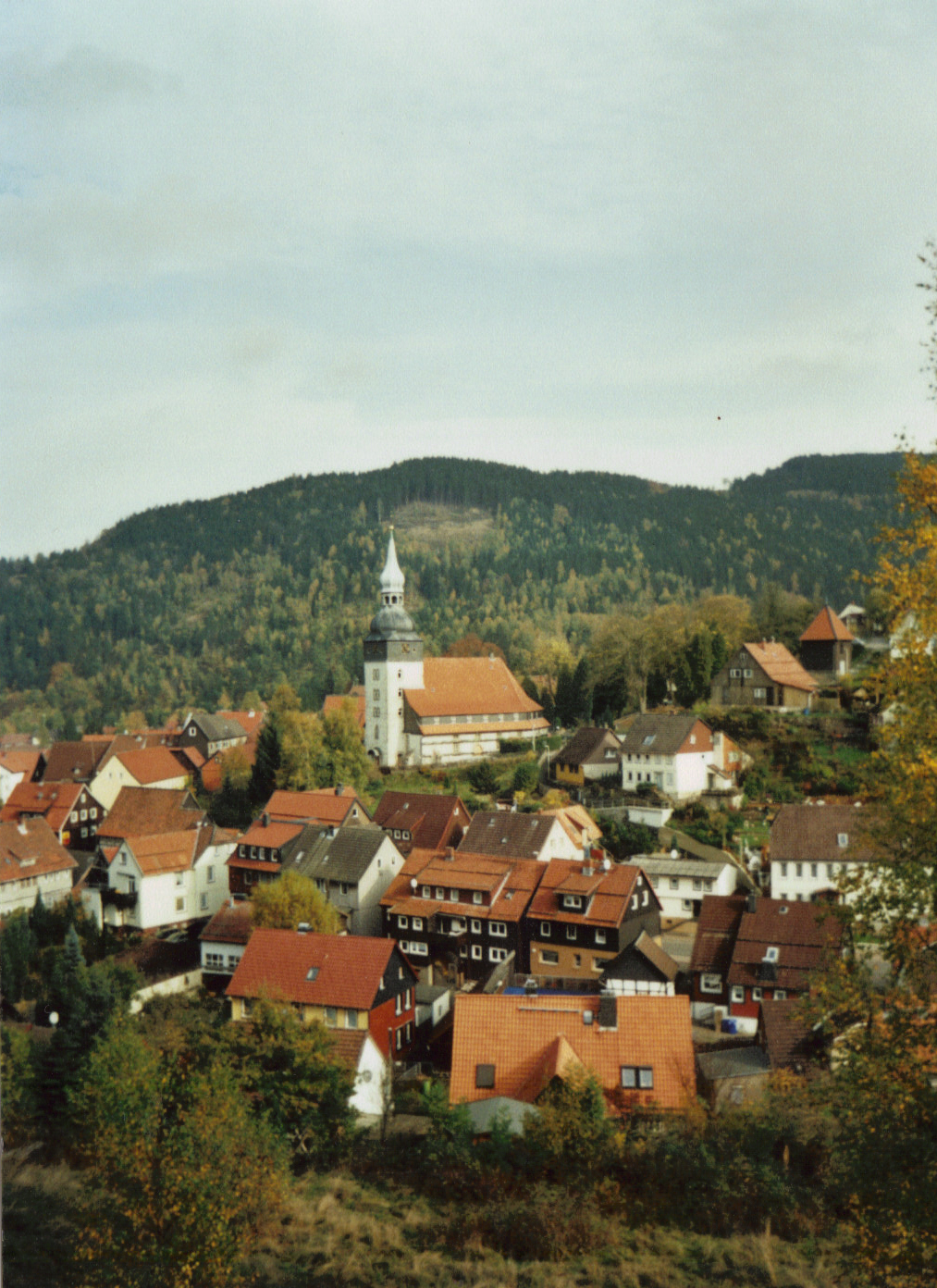
View of the town centre

The formerly free mining town (Bergstadt) of Lautenthal in Germany is a state-recognised, climatic spa with around 1,570 inhabitants and has been part of the borough of Langelsheim since 1972.

== Geography ==
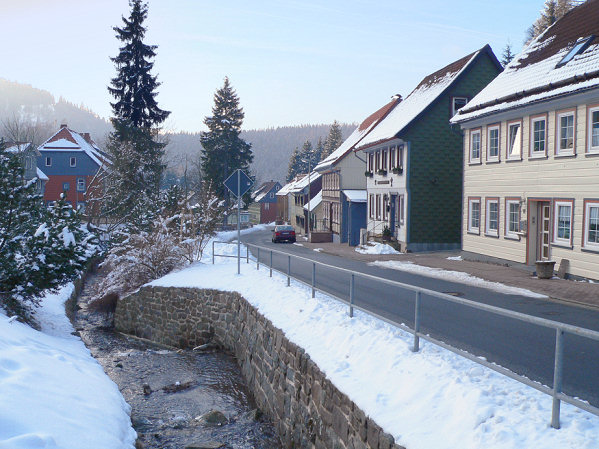
Laute in Lautenthal

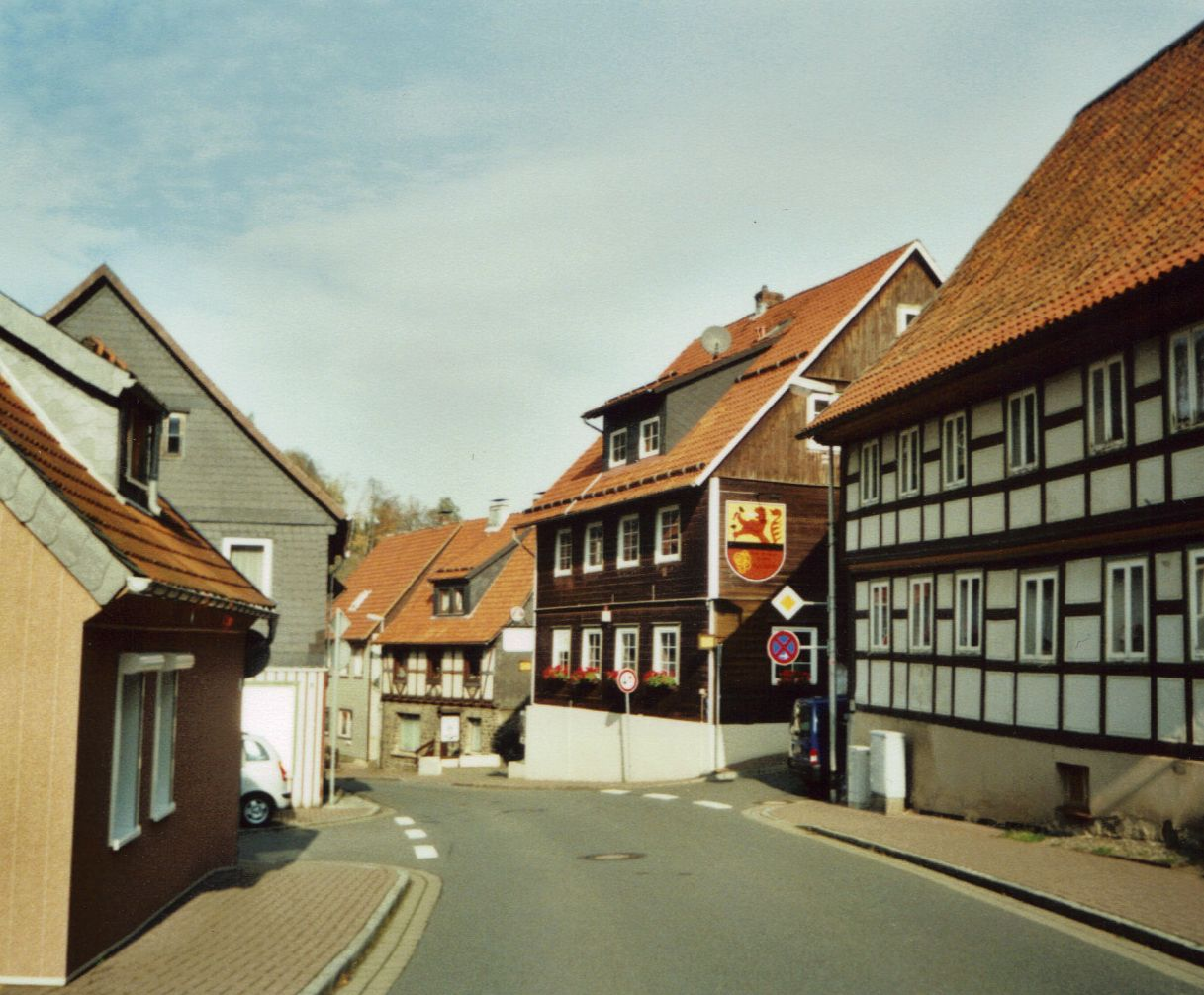
High Street (Hahnenkleer Straße)

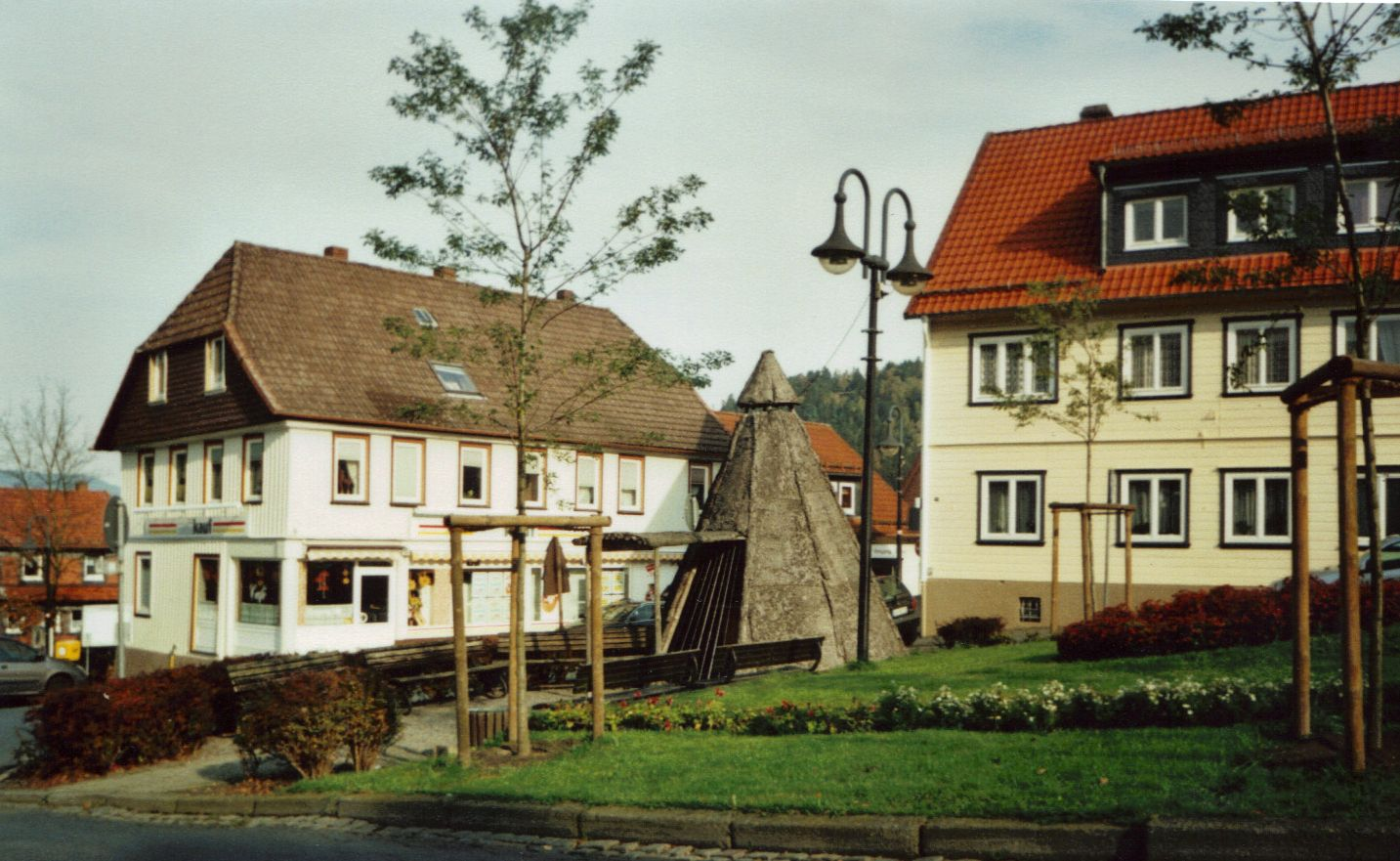
Market Place

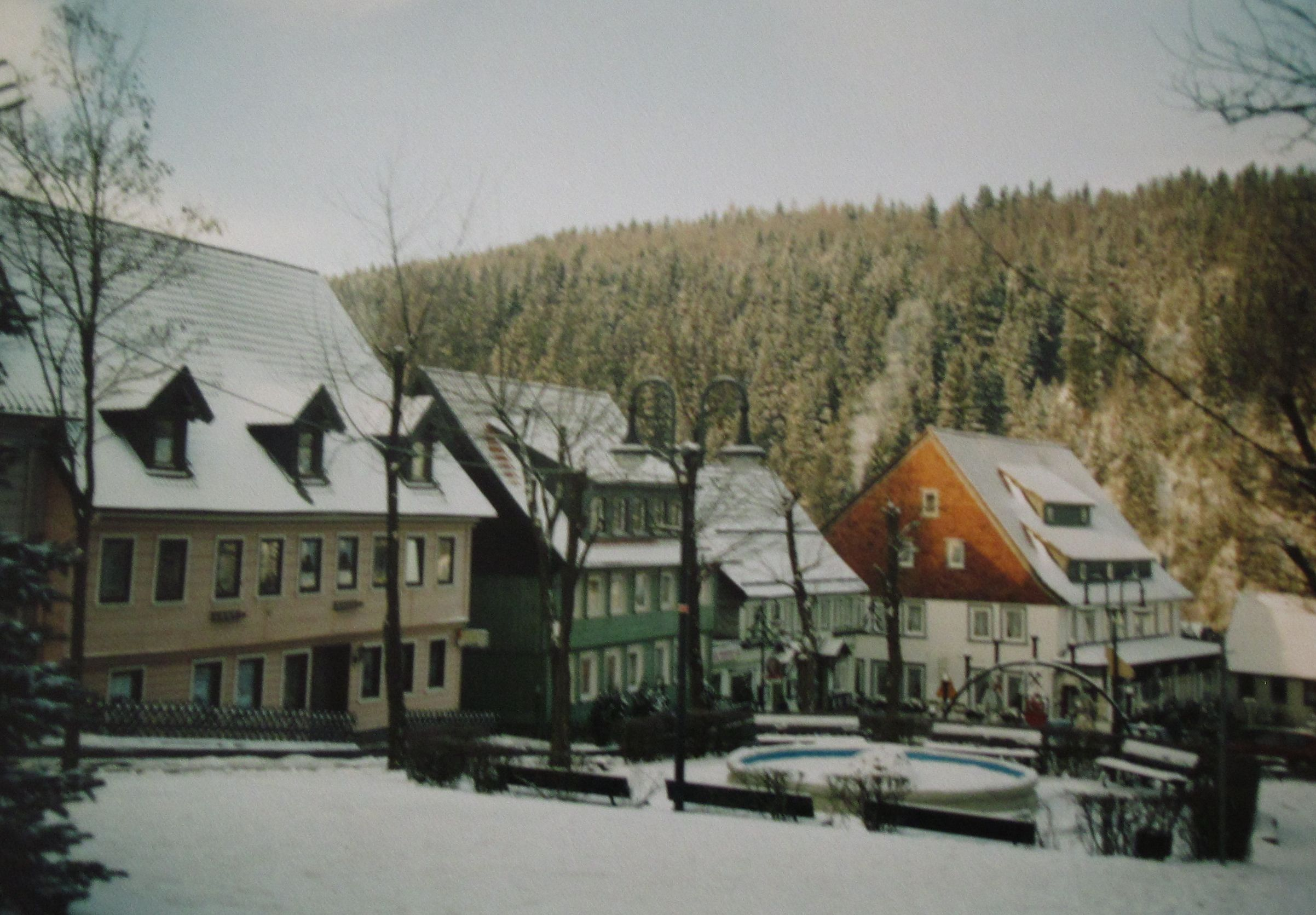
Market Place with former Town Hall

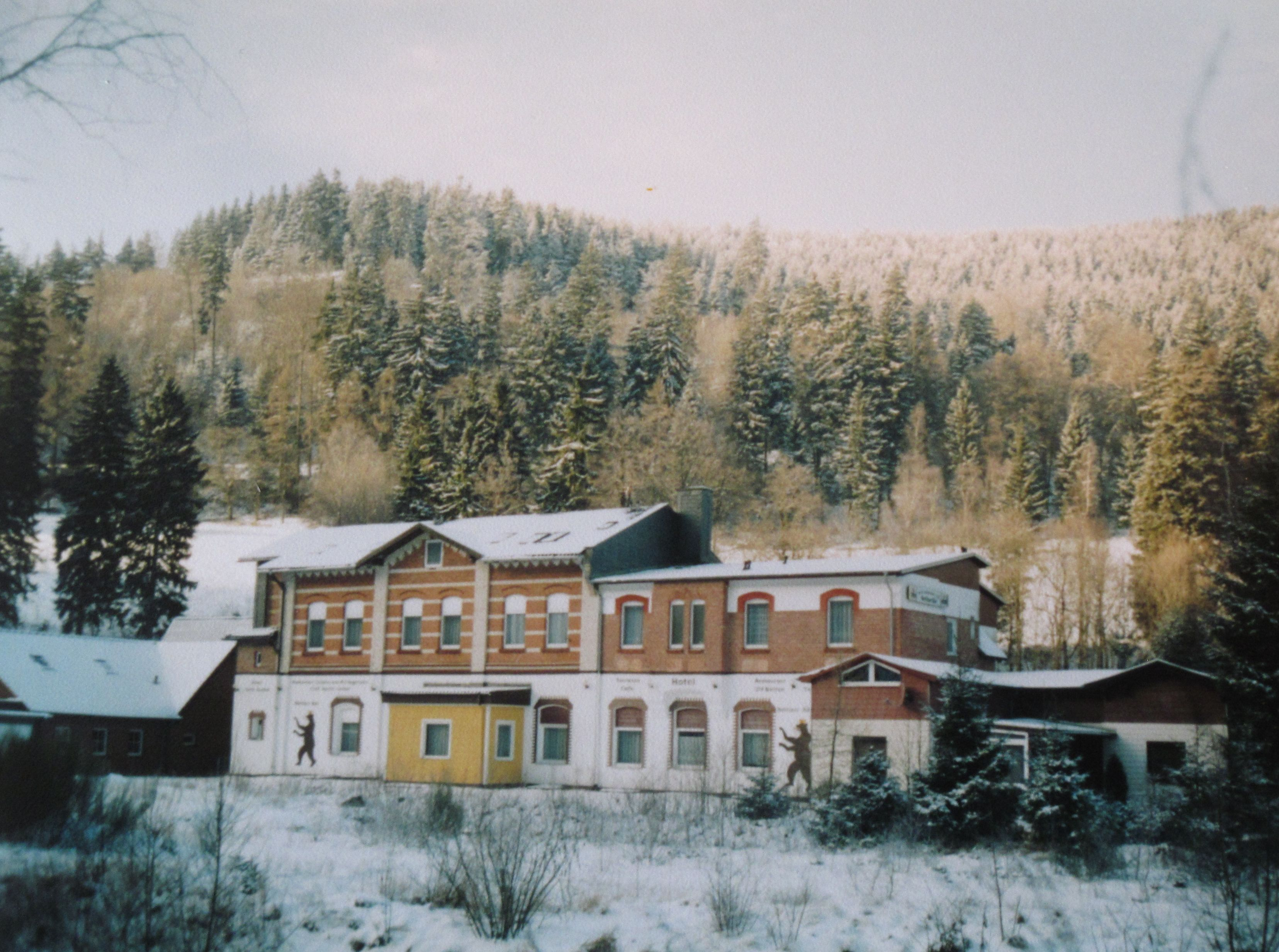
Former railway station

Lautenthal lies in the Innerste valley between Clausthal-Zellerfeld and Langelsheim in the northwestern Upper Harz. The town is located at a height of about 300 m above sea level (NN) in a valley bowl, the surrounding mountains being up to 620 m above NN. The two rivers of the Innerste and the Laute flow through the town. Towards Langelsheim the Innerste is impounded by the Innerste Dam.

== History ==
Mining of copper, lead and silver in the area around Lautenthal started about 1225. In the middle of the 14th century, however, the Harz was depopulated because of plague and mining came to an end.

Mining in the Harz was started again in 1524. Lautenthal was founded in 1538 as a mining settlement on the river Laute, a small tributary of the Innerste, and had already been given the status of a town by 1580. Sixteen years later it became a free mining town. The town was enlarged in 1560 and a rectangular market place was laid out. A comparatively large town hall was built in 1570. The building was transformed into a hotel later. In 1626, the town was plundered by the troops of Johann Tserclaes, Count of Tilly in the Thirty Years' War. The Protestant town church was built 1649-59. In 1690, 28 mines were operated in and around Lautenthal. In 1821, the town had 2.006 inhabitants. The railway line to Lautenthal, Innerste Valley Railway, was inaugurated in 1875 and extended to Altenau in 1914. Railway bridges were built over the Laute and the Innerste. Tourism gradually developed creating more and more jobs. At the beginning of the 20th century, Lautenthal had 2.626 inhabitants.

As of 30 June 2018, Lautenthal had a population of 1,570.

With the closure of the mines in 1959 the town lost its significance and was incorporated into the borough of Langelsheim in 1972. In 1976 the railway line to Lautenthal was closed and the former railway station was transformed into a hotel.

== Sights ==
- The former silver mine Lautenthals Glück was transformed into a museum in 1975.
- Paul Gerhardt Church, a Protestant church in the old town centre, was built from 1649-59. Its altar and the organ date from 1719.
- Originally, Lautenthal did not have a real Market Place, but an oblong street market on both sides of the oldest street Hahnenkleer Straße, the high street. Several well-preserved half-timbered houses from the 18th and 19th centuries can be seen here.
- One of the half-timbered houses in Hahnenkleer Straße was a brewery called Zwergenbräu from 1660-1959. It was transformed into a brewery museum in 1960.
- The present Market Place (Marktplatz) was laid out in 1560. In the Middle Ages, many inhabitants of Lautenthal worked as charcoal-burners who lived in small wooden huts in the forest in summer. A small charcoal-burner's hut, rebuilt in a traditional style, can be seen in the middle of the Market Place. The former Town Hall was built in 1570 and transformed into a hotel in 1658. It was inhabited by Goethe in 1784 and by King George V. in 1862.
- The old clocktower was built in 1680 on a hill offering a scenic view of the town. Opposite, the former hospital is worth a look.
- One of the tourist attractions of Lautenthal is the smallest house of the western Harz Mountains which can be seen in the lane An der Laute.
- The former railway station of Lautenthal was inaugurated in 1877. After the railway line had been closed in 1976, it was transformed into a hotel.

== Sources ==
- Paul Ernst (1940), Das Glück von Lautenthal (in German), München: Albert Langen/Georg Müller
