= Grumbach (Innerste) =

River in Germany

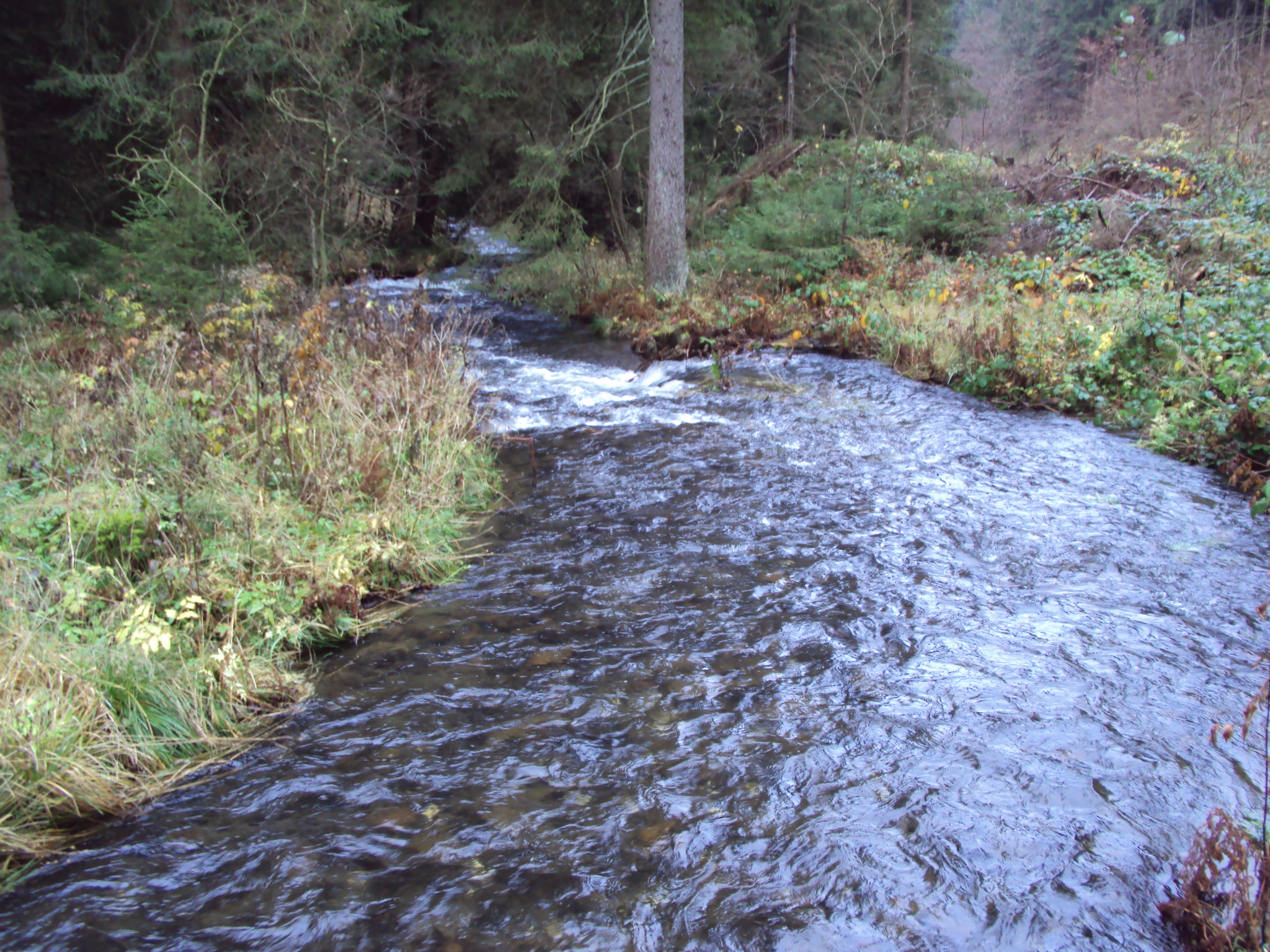

Location
- Country: Germany
- States: Lower Saxony

Physical characteristics
- Mouth
  - location: Innerste
  - coordinates: 51.8286°N 10.2817°E

Basin features
- Progression: Innerste→ Leine→ Aller→ Weser→ North Sea

Grumbach is a river of Lower Saxony, Germany. It flows into the Innerste in Wildemann.

== See also ==
- List of rivers of Lower Saxony
