= Kupferstrang =

River in Germany

Coordinates: 52.1699°N 9.9231°E

Location
- Country: Germany
- States: Lower Saxony

Kupferstrang is a small river of Lower Saxony, Germany. It is a branch of the Innerste in Hildesheim.

== See also ==
- List of rivers of Lower Saxony
