= Laute =

River in Germany

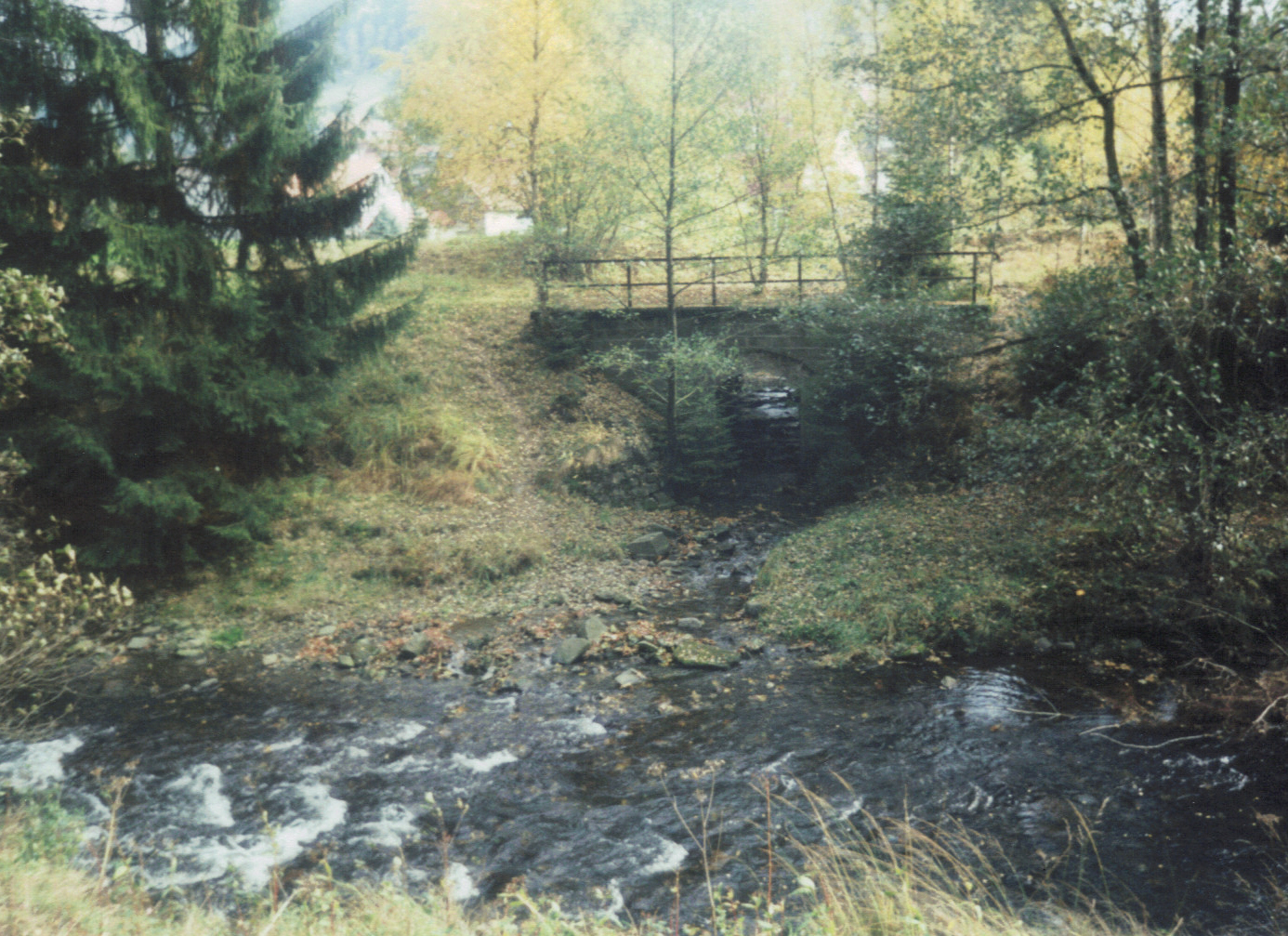

Location
- Country: Germany
- State: Lower Saxony
- Location: Upper Harz

Physical characteristics
- Source
  - location: near Hahnenklee
  - elevation: ca. 540 m above sea level (NN)
- Mouth
  - location: in Lautenthal into the Innerste
  - coordinates: 51.8698°N 10.2851°E
  - elevation: 300 m above sea level (NN)
- Length: 6 km (3.7 mi)

Basin features
- Progression: Innerste→ Leine→ Aller→ Weser→ North Sea

Laute is a river of Lower Saxony, Germany. It is a right tributary of the Innerste.

The Laute rises in the vicinity of Hahnenklee in the Upper Harz and discharges about 6 km (3.7 mi) later into the Innerste in Lautenthal. The source is at an elevation of about 540 m at the bottom of a mountain called Kuttelbacher Berg. The Laute flows to the west parallel to road L 516 which is called Hahnenkleer Straße in Lautenthal. The name of the town means Laute Valley. The mouth is at an elevation of about 300 m in the west of Wildemanner Strasse, the high street of Lautenthal.

In 1875 a railway bridge of the Innerste Valley Railway was built over the Laute close to its mouth. Although the railway line was closed in 1977, the bridge is well preserved and still used by hikers. A flood of the Laute caused considerable damage in Lautenthal in 1877.

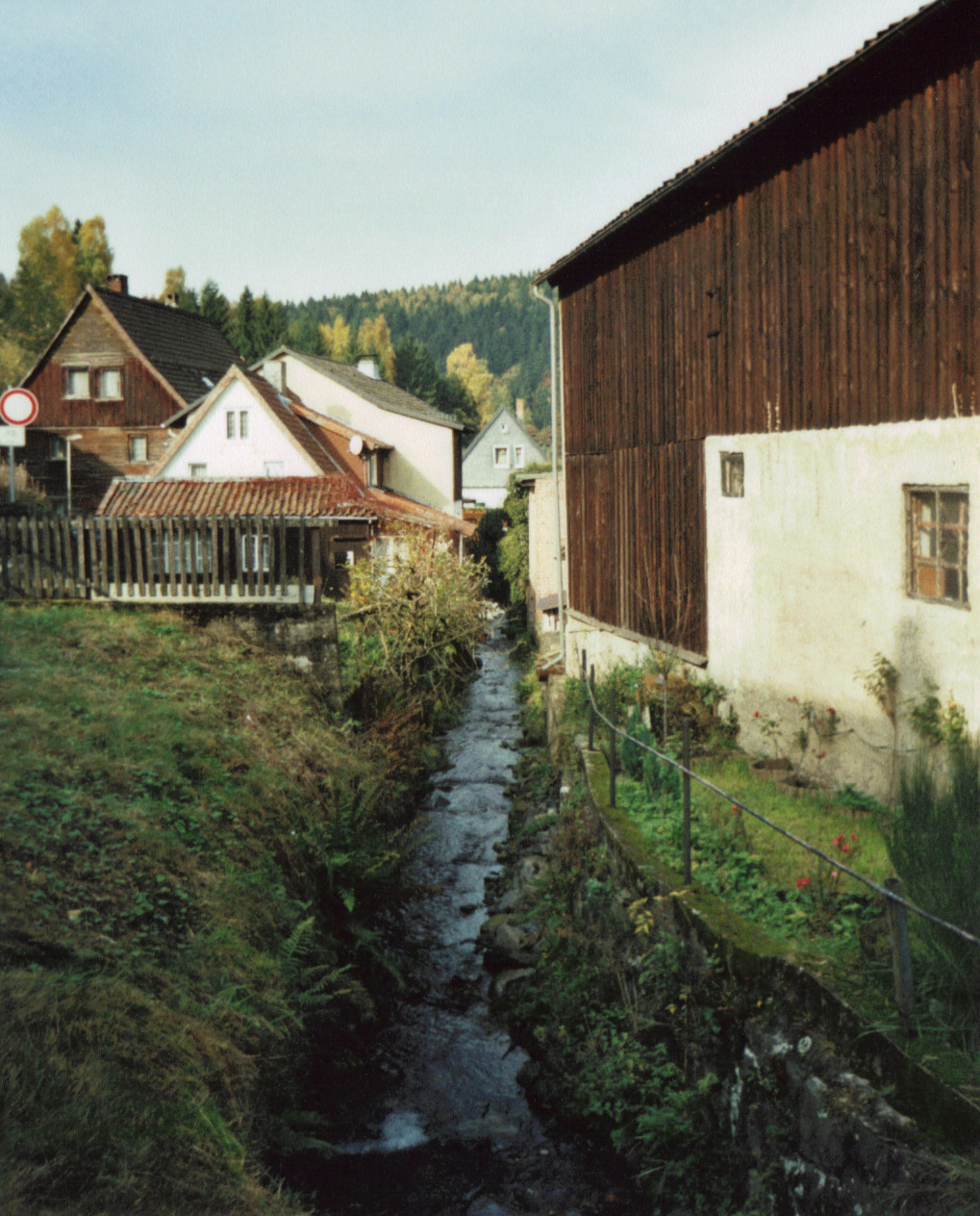
Laute in the east of Lautenthal

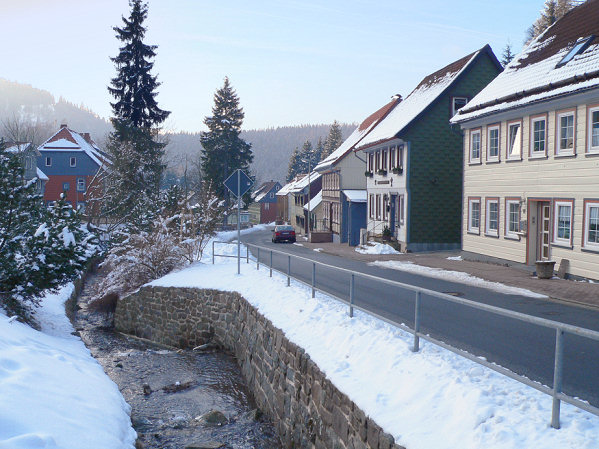
Laute in the middle of Lautenthal

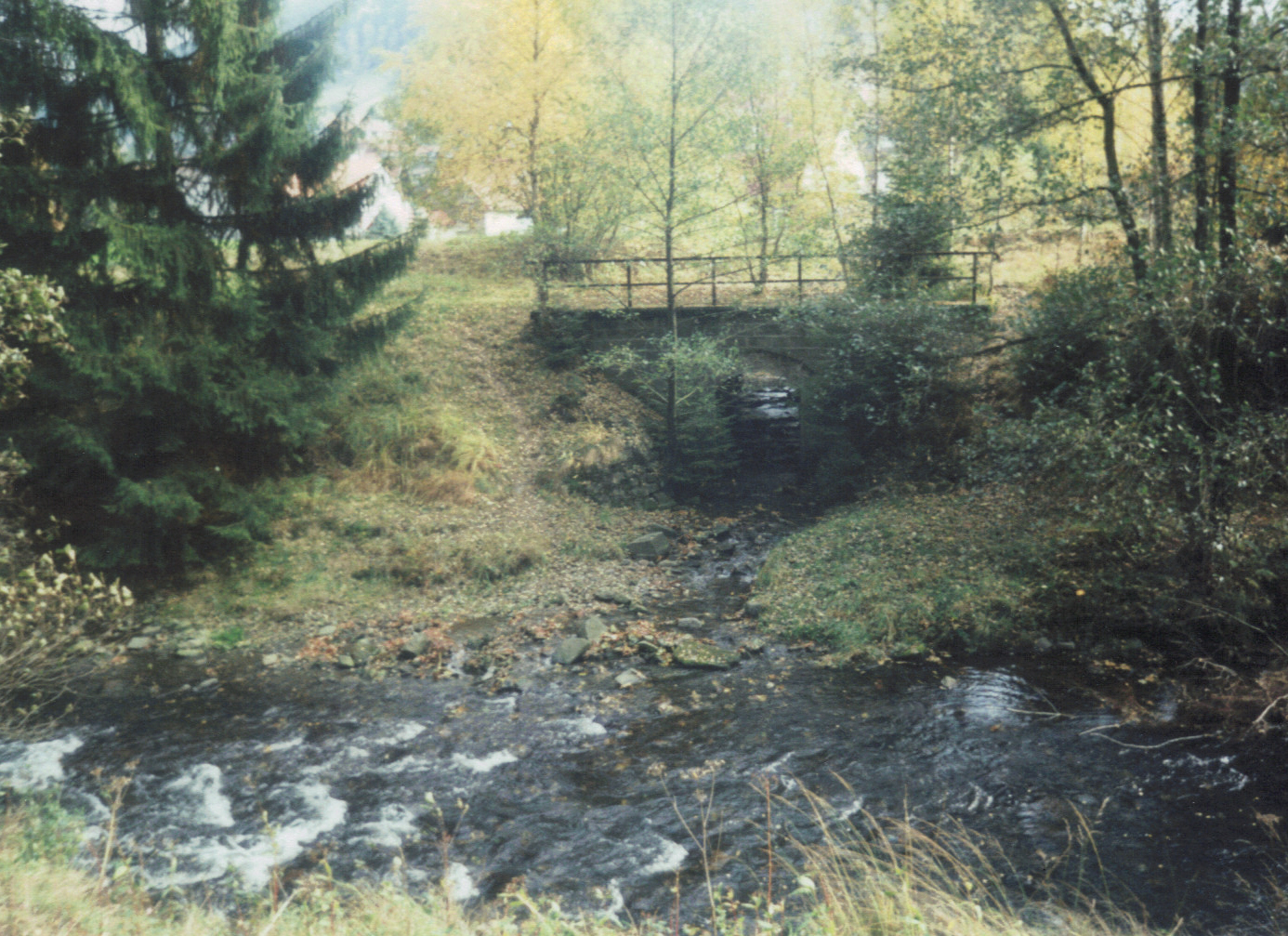
Former railway bridge over the Laute which discharges into the Innerste (in the foreground)

== See also ==
- List of rivers of Lower Saxony
