= Steuerwald Castle =

Coordinates: 52°10′09″N 9°55′39″E

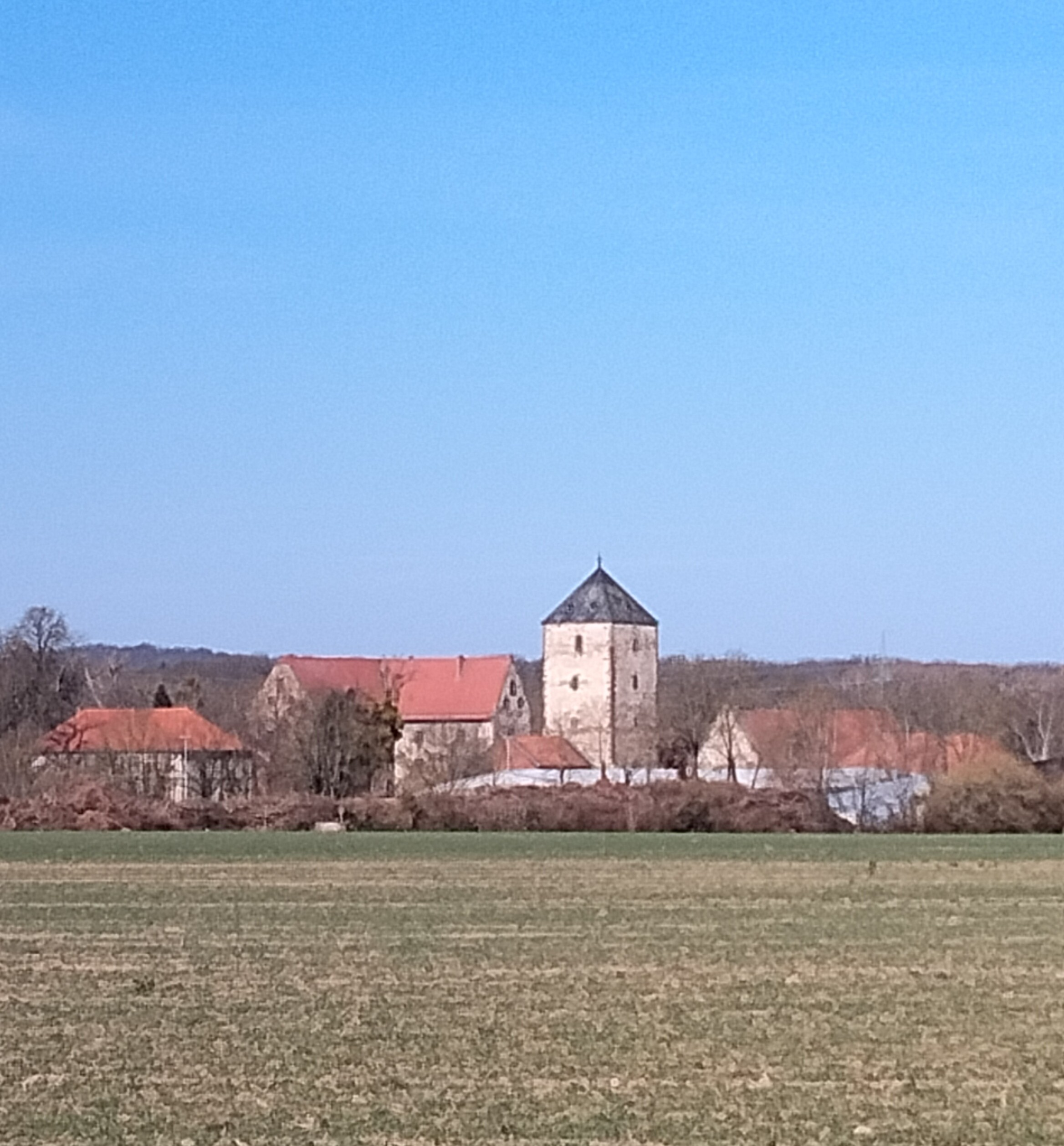
General view from the south

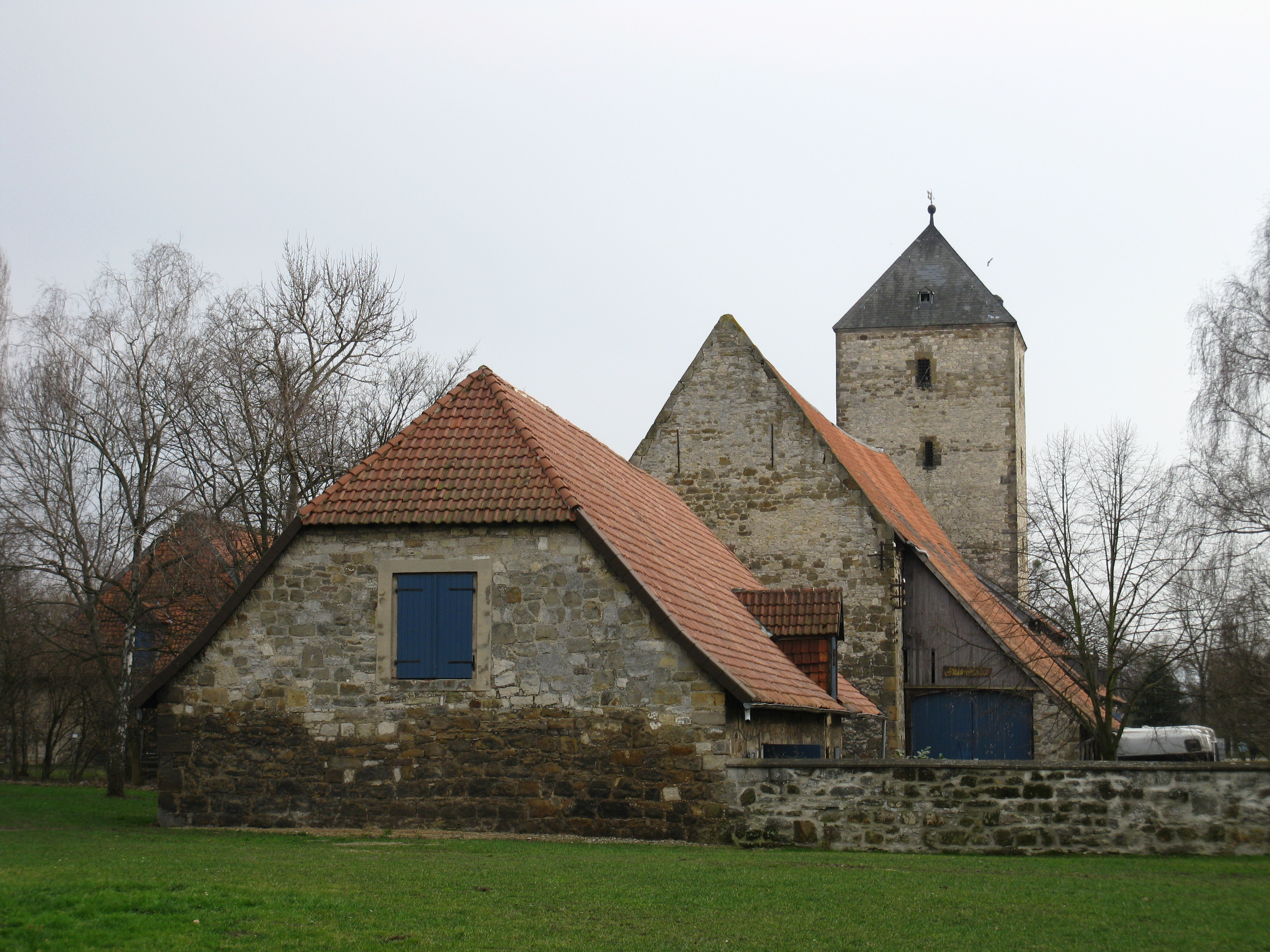
General view from the north

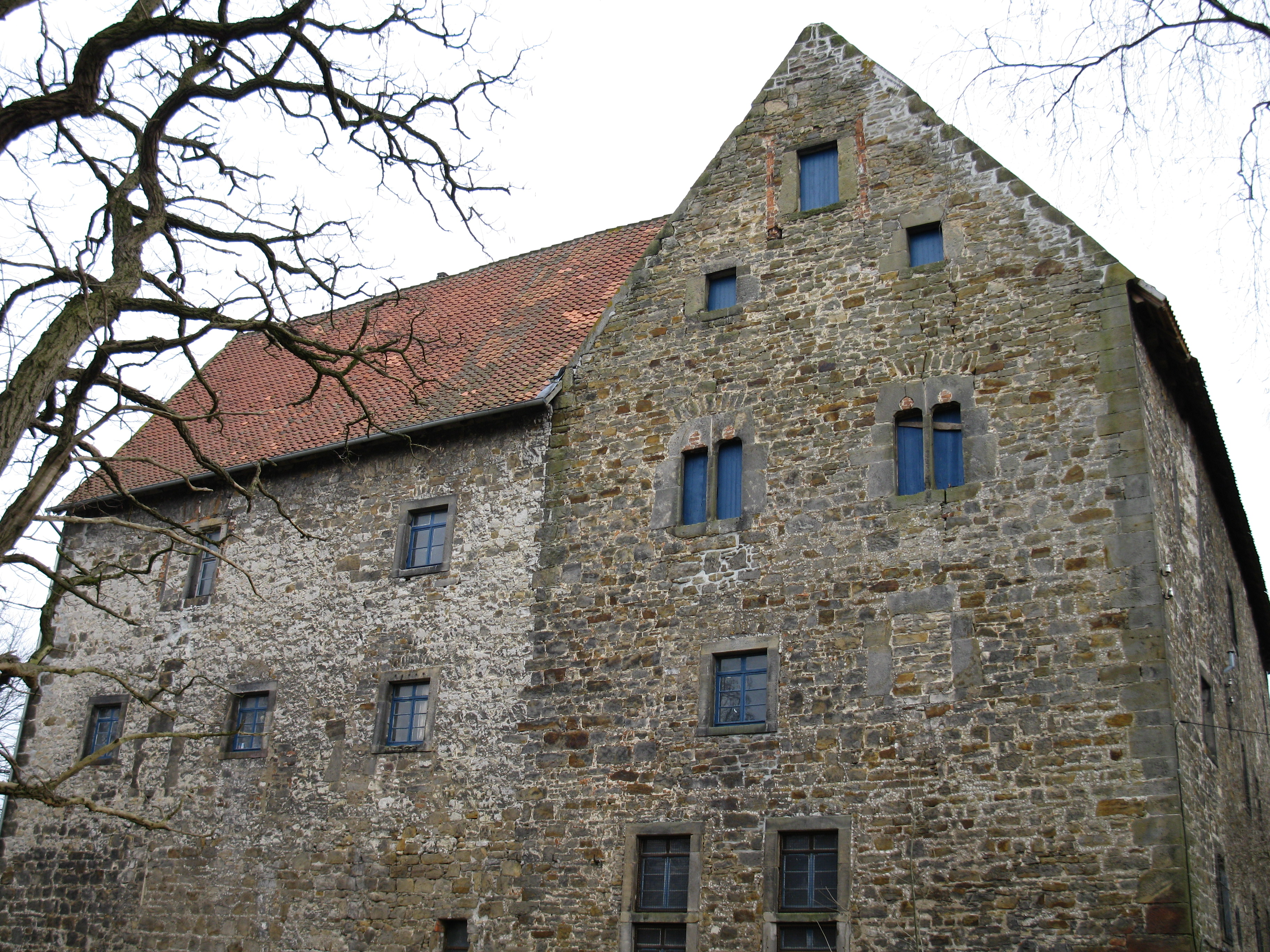
Romanesque palas

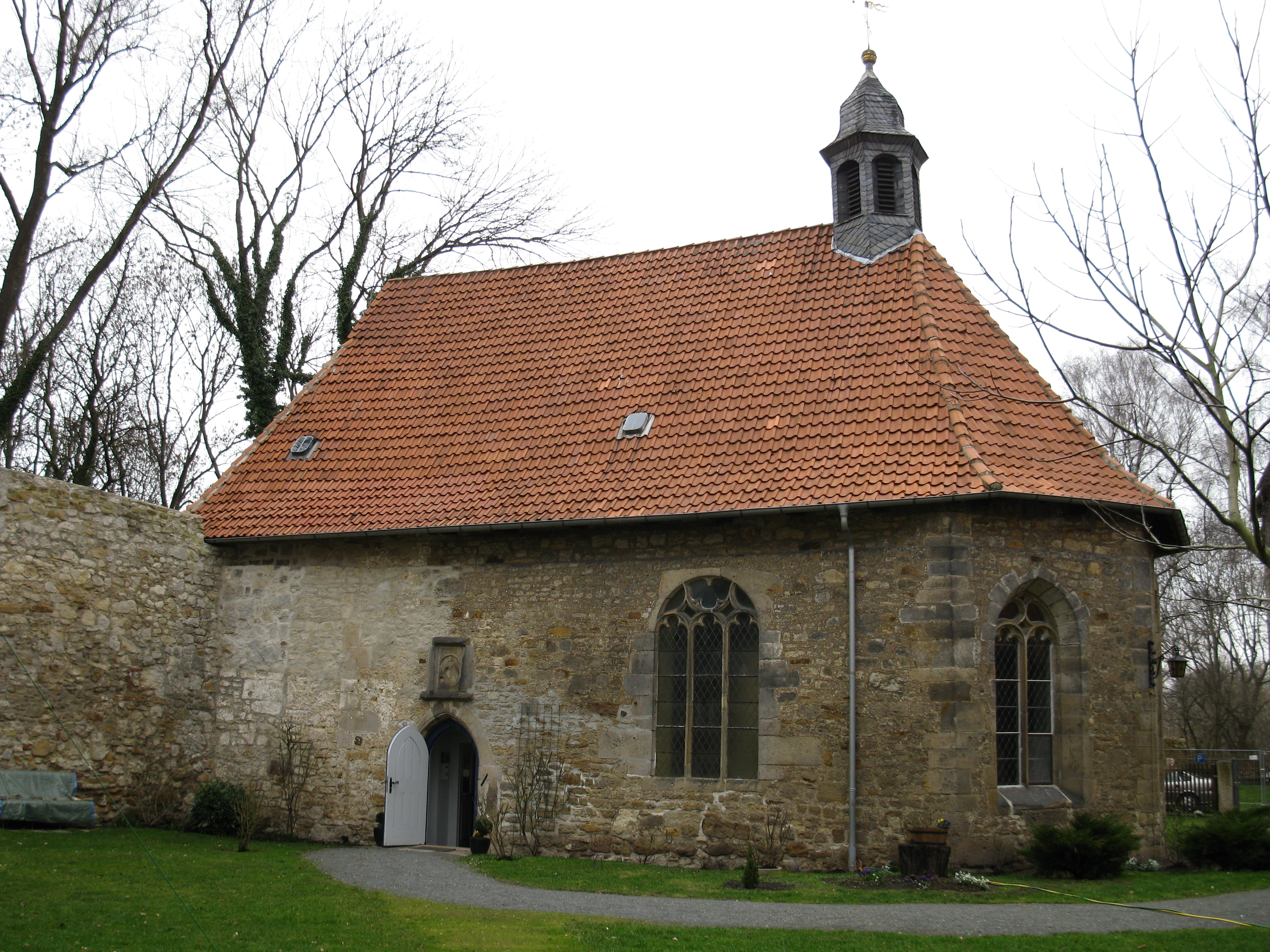
St. Magdalena's Chapel

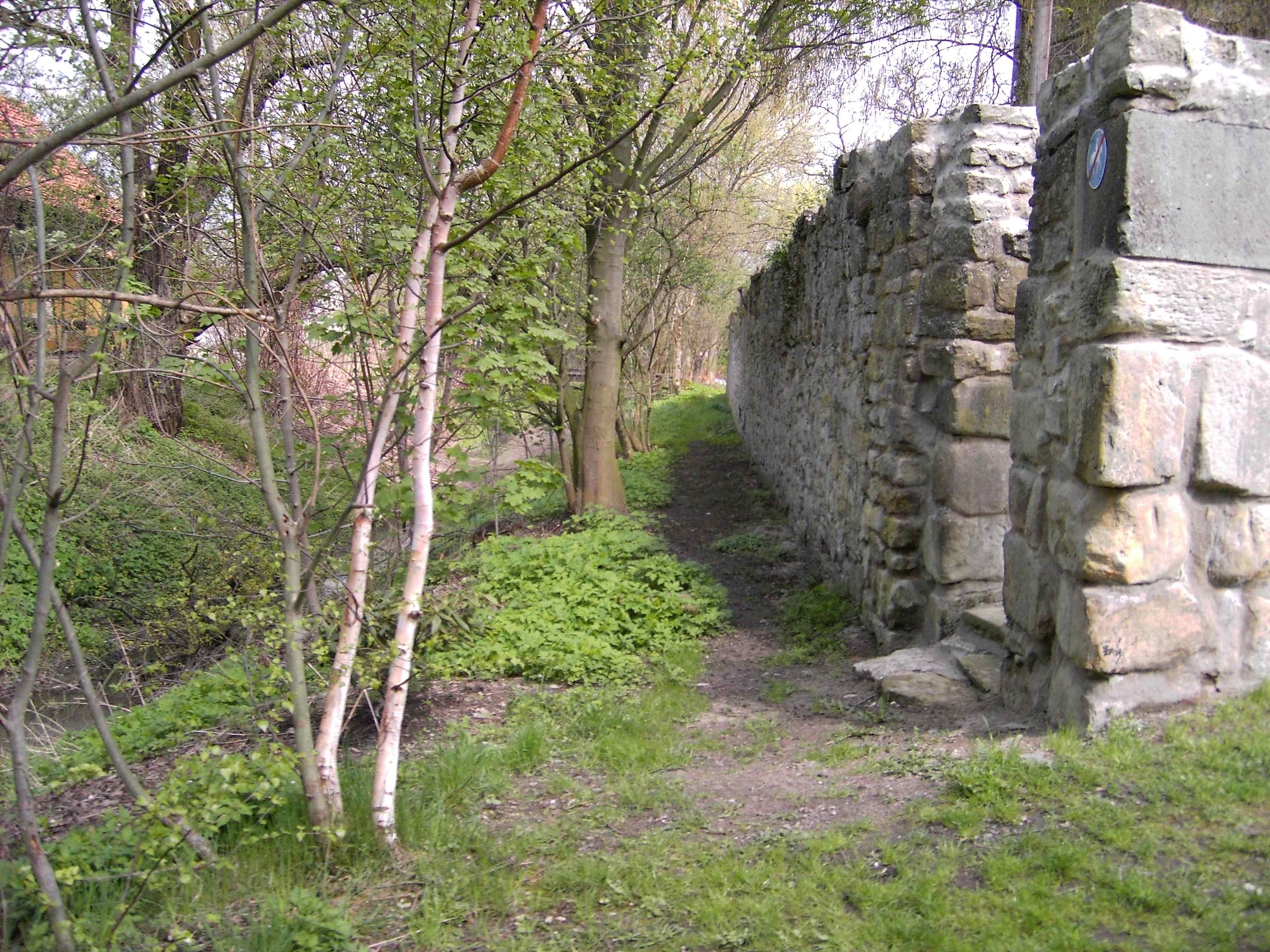
Moat and old wall

Steuerwald Castle (Burg Steuerwald) is a Romanesque castle in Hildesheim, a city in Lower Saxony, Germany.

The castle is currently used by a private riding club and is not open to the public. There are plans to convert the castle into a cultural centre and to use it for exhibitions and concerts afterwards. The roofs of the Romanesque palace and of several other buildings were renovated in 2010.

== History ==
Hildesheim was founded as the seat of the Bishopric of Hildesheim in 815. The settlement around the cathedral of Hildesheim was ruled by the clergy for four centuries and it quickly developed into a town which was awarded market rights by King Otto III in 983. The town grew further and obtained city rights in 1249, developing into a very wealthy merchant city. At the end of the 13th century, Hildesheim had about 5,000 inhabitants and was one of the biggest and richest cities in the North of Germany. The citizens gained more and more self-confidence and did not want to be governed by the bishop any longer. As the bishop did not want to reside in the rebellious and dangerous city any more, he ordered Steuerwald Castle in the North of the city to be built as a new residence. When the castle was completed in 1313, he left Hildesheim. The bishops of Hildesheim resided in Steuerwald Castle until 1763. Then a bishop's palace was built in the centre of the city opposite the cathedral.

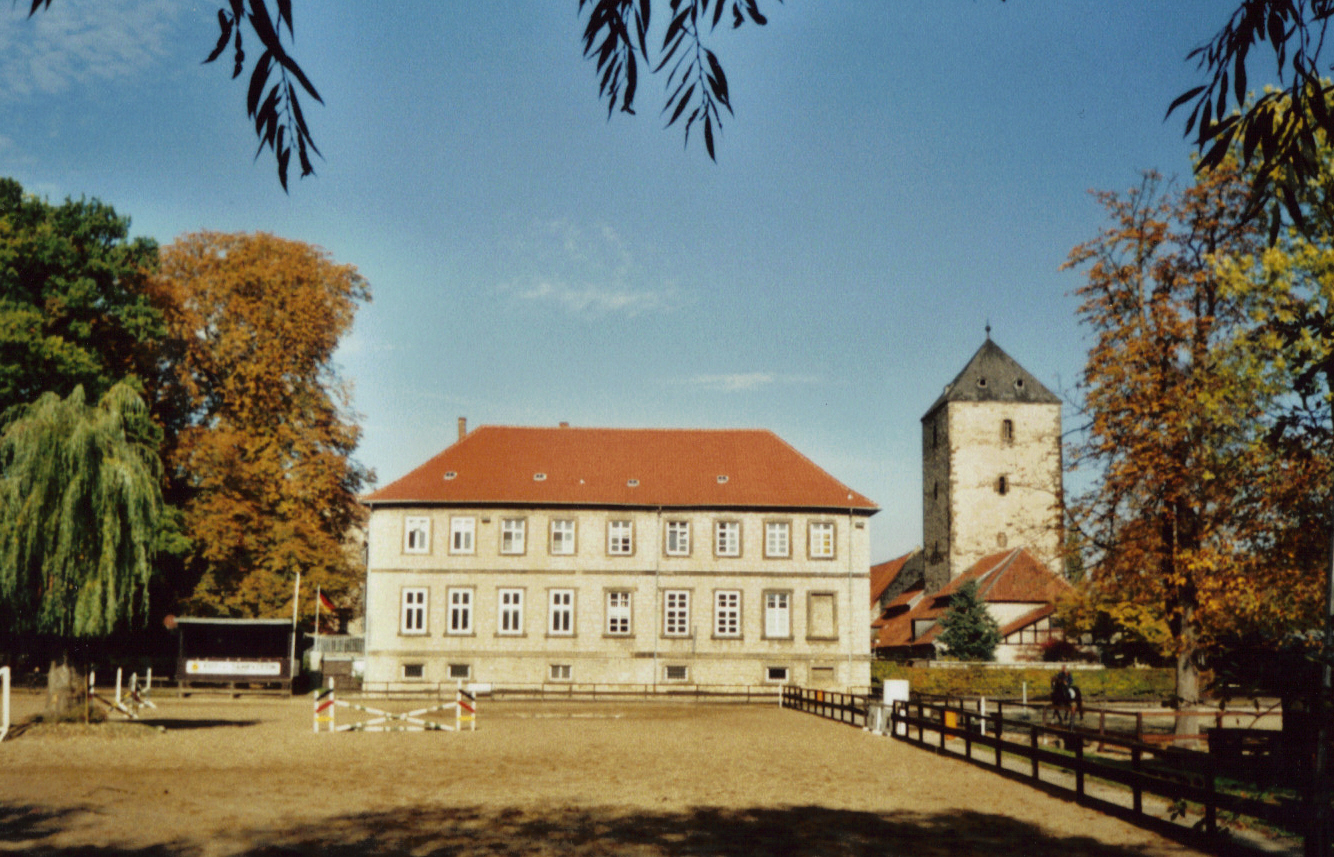
Castle keep and Tenant's House

According to the orders given by Henry III, Steuerwald Castle was built in 1310–1313 near the river Innerste in the North of Hildesheim, about 3 kilometres from the city The Castle was surrounded by a rampart with a moat. Bishop Otto II (1319–31), successor of Henry III, ordered the castle to be enlarged. The tall castle keep was built in 1325. In the Thirty Years' War, Steuerwald Castle was enlarged again in 1622 under bishop Ferdinand of Bavaria. Then it was besieged several times and conquered on 4 June 1632, but only slightly damaged. After the Thirty Years' War had come to an end in 1648, the bishops of Hildesheim continued residing in Steuerwald Castle. Bishop Clemens August of Bavaria ordered a part of the castle to be remodelled in 1728 once more. During the secularization, the Catholic Church lost the castle in 1803. It was transformed into a government-owned domain, and some buildings which had deep cellars were used as a brewery. Several barns and stables were built, and a part of the moat was levelled, as the space was needed for the construction of a tenant's house in 1819. The City of Hildesheim bought the castle on 1 September 1912 as most of its grounds were needed to construct an inland harbour and a canal.

The small village of Steuerwald developed around the castle on the river Innerste. At the beginning of the 20th century it had 231 inhabitants, of whom most were working in the domain. In 1912, the village of Steuerwald became a part of the city of Hildesheim. Most of the buildings of the village had to be torn down when the inland harbour of Hildesheim was built. The harbour was inaugurated in 1926.

During World War II, the roofs of the romanesque palace and of some of the barns received some damage, when a bomb exploded near Steuerwald during an air raid on Hanover on 9 October 1943. After the war, Steuerwald Castle was used for residential purposes, as the city of Hildesheim had suffered severe bomb damage. In the 1970s, a race course was laid out behind the castle which has been used by a riding club since 1973.

== Architecture ==
Steuerwald Castle has been remodelled and enlarged several times over the centuries, but the castle keep, the north and west aisles, a large barn and especially the romanesque palace, all dating from the Late Middle Ages, are well-preserved.

- In the west, a part of the moat and the old wall with firing slits is preserved. In the second half of the 18th century, a large half-timbered store house was built outside the castle; this is to be renovated.
- The castle keep reaching a height of 26 metres has a quadrate basis measuring 9.35 × 9.35 metres, firing slits and a tent roof. Due to its walls reaching a thickness of 2 metres it was used as a prison in former times. Originally there was a door in the basis of the keep which served as the main entrance to the castle. Today, the keep is surrounded by a stable which was built in 1819.
- The inner court measures 175 × 175 metres. The Romanesque palas, reaching a height of 23.15 metres, was built of sandstone at the beginning of the 14th century. Only the north and the west aisles are preserved. The palace has four floors and several gothic lancet windows. On the third floor there is a great hall. The roof was renovated in 2010.
- In the inner court there is a large barn, built of sandstone dating to the 14th century.
- The Tenant's House is one of the buildings which were added later. It was built in 1819 with a flight of outdoor stairs.
- St. Magdalena's Chapel was built in a Romanesque style in 1310. In 1507 it was remodelled in a gothic style and an apse with lancet windows was added. Above the entrance with a typical pointed arch there is a noteworthy sandstone relief showing the coat of arms of bishop John IV who ordered the chapel to be remodelled. The chapel, which was renovated in 1990, has 55 seats and is used for concerts and weddings.
