= Innerste =

River in Germany

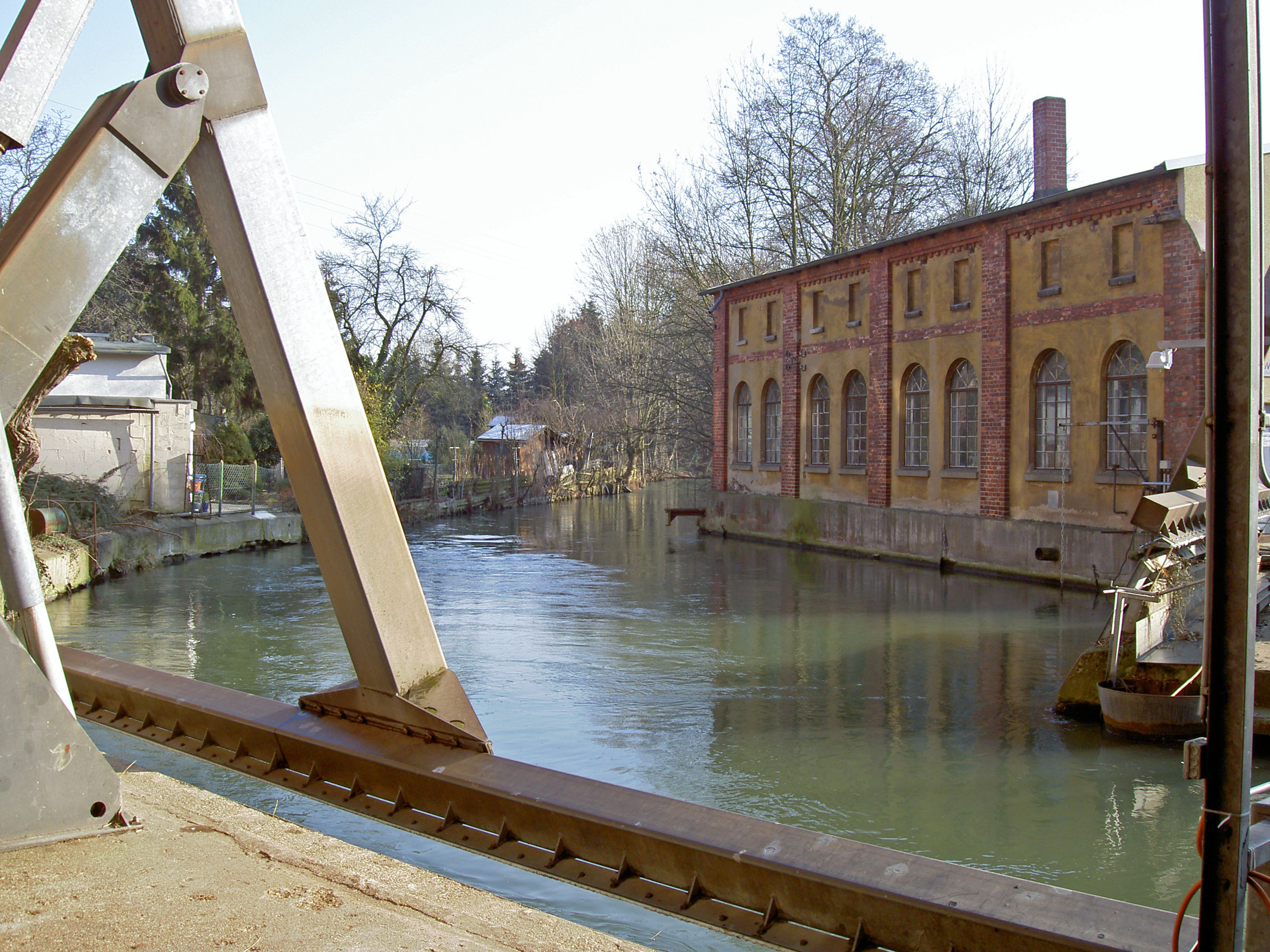
- The Innerste in Sarstedt

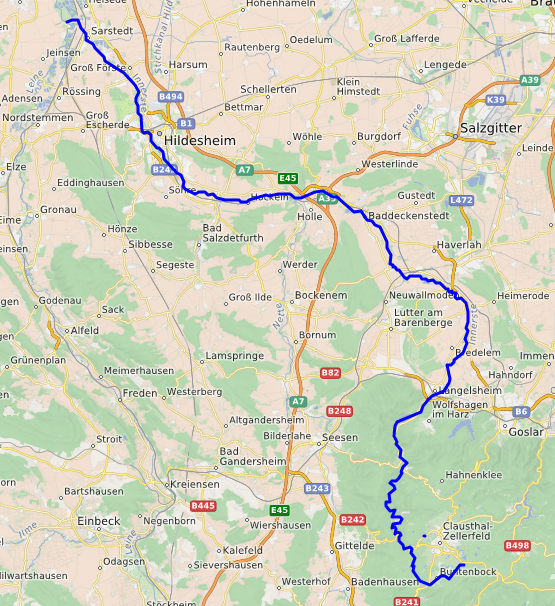

Location
- Country: Germany
- State: Lower Saxony

Physical characteristics
- Source
  - location: Harz
  - elevation: 615 m (2,018 ft)
- Mouth
  - location: Leine
  - coordinates: 52°14′50″N 9°49′30″E
- Length: 100.7 km (62.6 mi)
- Basin size: 1,265 km^{2} (488 sq mi)
- Discharge
  - average: ±10 m^{3}/s (350 cu ft/s)

Basin features
- Progression: Leine→ Aller→ Weser→ North Sea

The Innerste (German pronunciation: [ˈɪnɐstə]) is a river in Lower Saxony, Germany. It is a right tributary of the Leine river and 101 km (63 mi) in length.

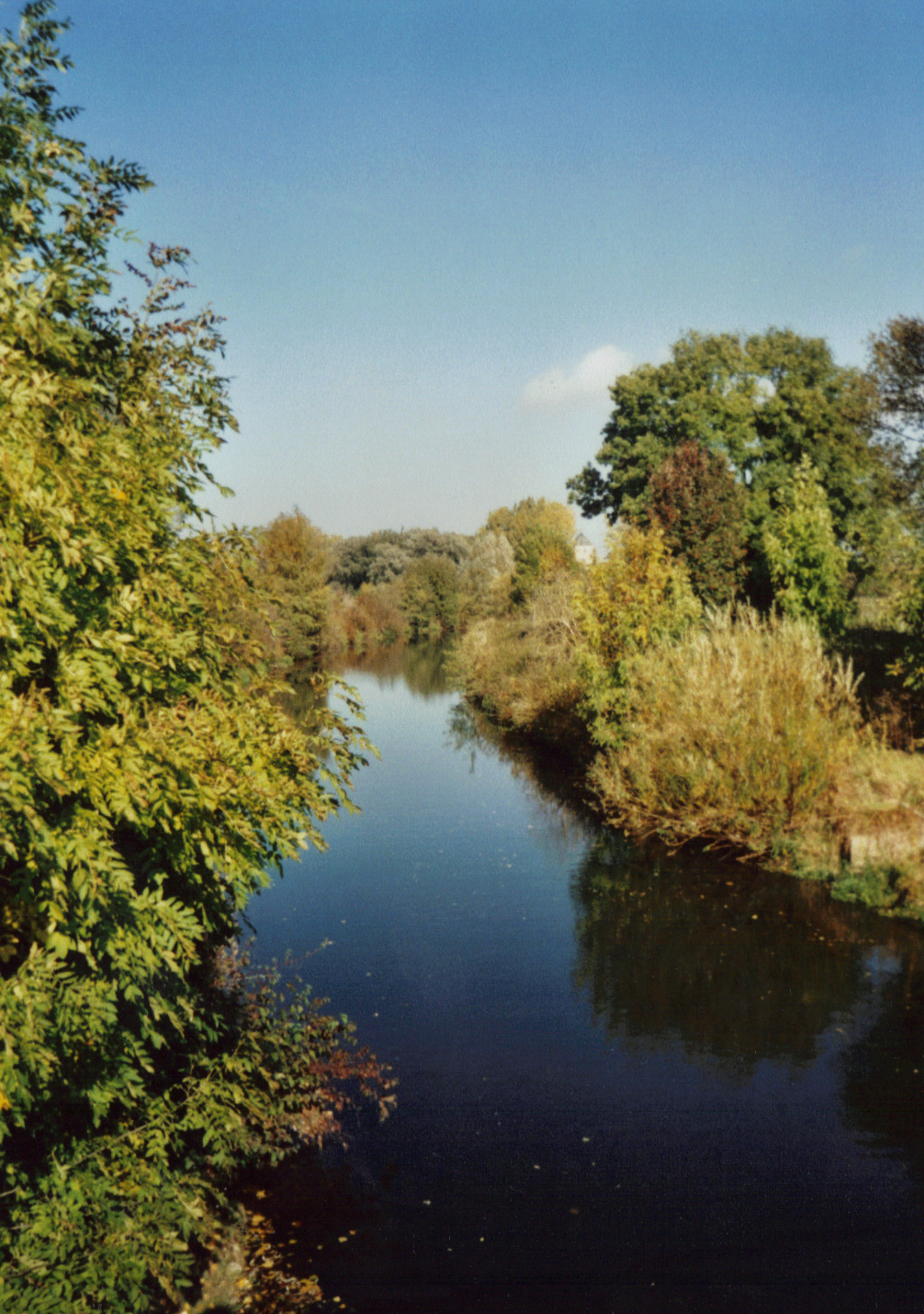
River Innerste near Steuerwald Castle

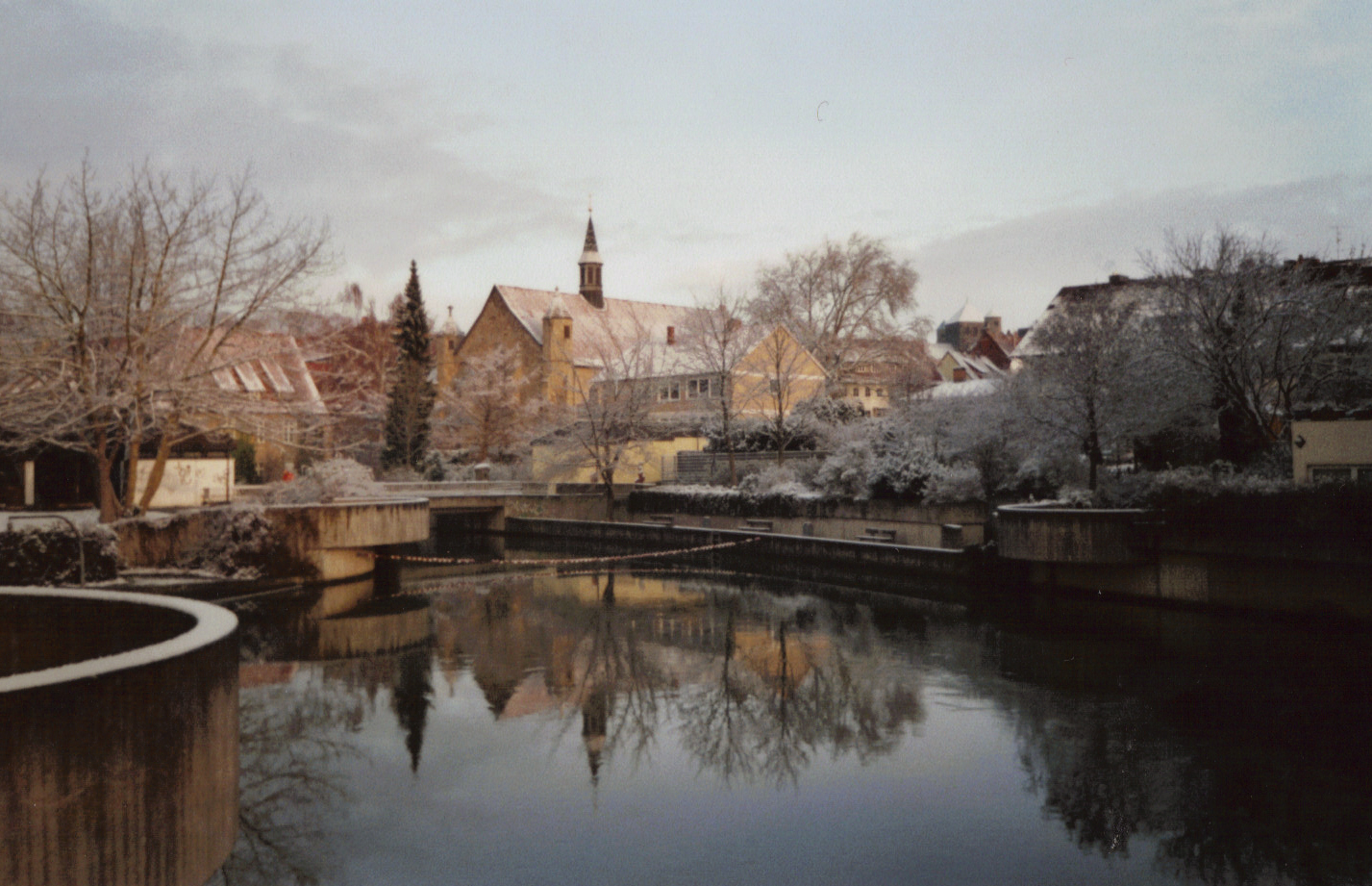
River Innerste in the center of Hildesheim in winter

== Origin of the name ==
The river name is not related to the German word innerste meaning innermost. Innerste, in earlier times called the Inste (1805), Inderste (1567), Indistria (1313), Entrista (1065) and Indrista (1013), probably goes back to the Indo-Germanic root oid = turbulent, strong. It may be the name referred to in the name of the battlefield of Idistaviso (16 A.D.).

== Course ==
The river's source is in the Harz mountains, 4 km (2.5 mi) from the town of Clausthal-Zellerfeld to the southwest at an elevation of 615 m and is called Innerstesprung. As a small brook, the Innerste flows west and passes a system of lakes, the first of which is called Entensumpf. The next lakes are Oberer Nassenwieser Teich, Bärenbrucher Teich, Ziegenberger Teich, and Sumpfteich. The German word Teich means "pond".

Having passed through the middle of the village of Buntenbock, the Innerste passes Prinzenteich and turns to the west to Wildemann (390 m), one of the smallest towns in Germany. Grumbach, one of the first tributaries, flows into the Innerste in the middle of Wildemann. The Innerste turns to the North to Lautenthal (300 m), another town on its course and flows parallel to the abandoned track of the Innerste Valley Railway. Here the Laute flows into the Innerste in the middle of Lautenthal. The name of the town means "Laute Valley". Near Lautenthal the Innerste is dammed (the Innerstetalsperre). When the dam was built 1963–1966, a nice lake for holidays and watersports was created. A few kilometers further on, the Innerste leaves the Harz Mountains near the town of Langelsheim (204 m) and turns to the Northwest. The first tributary is river Grane (12 km (7.5 mi) in length).

From here, the Innerste flows through the Harzvorland, a hilly countryside. Further tributaries are river Nette (42 km (26 mi) in length), river Lamme (21 km (13 mi) in length), river Bruchgraben, river Neile and river Beuster (12 km (7.5 mi) in length). Some more towns on its course are the southern quarters of Salzgitter and Hildesheim. The Innerste passes Marienburg Castle, the centre of Hildesheim (90 m) and Steuerwald Castle in the North of the City.

North of Hildesheim, the Innerste enters the North German Plain. About 18 km (11 mi) further on, it flows into the Leine near the town of Sarstedt, south of Hanover, at an elevation of 65 m.

== Media ==
Wilhelm Raabe wrote a novelle titled Die Innerste.

== See also ==
- List of rivers of Lower Saxony
