= Nordharz (Verwaltungsgemeinschaft) =

Coordinates: 51°54′N 10°43′E

Nordharz ("north Harz") was a Verwaltungsgemeinschaft ("collective municipality") in the district of Harz, in Saxony-Anhalt, Germany. It was situated north of the Harz mountain range and the town of Wernigerode. The seat of the Verwaltungsgemeinschaft was in Veckenstedt. It was disbanded on 1 January 2010.

== Subdivision ==
The Verwaltungsgemeinschaft Nordharz consisted of the following municipalities (population as of 2006):

1. Abbenrode (946)
2. Derenburg (2,662)
3. Heudeber (1,273)
4. Langeln (1,110)
5. Reddeber (880)
6. Schmatzfeld (355)
7. Stapelburg (1,391)
8. Veckenstedt (1,475)
9. Wasserleben (1,540)
