= Heudeber =

- Ortsteil of Nordharz
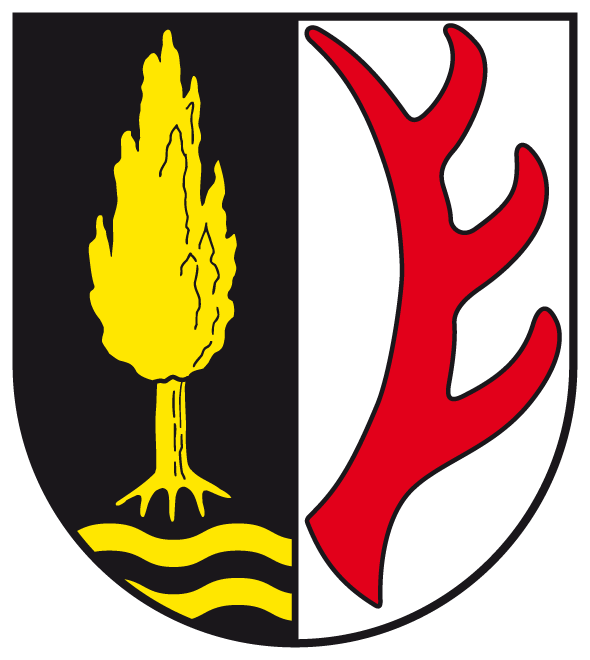
- Coat of arms
- Interactive map of Heudeber
- Location within Germany Location within Saxony-Anhalt
- Coordinates: 51°53′N 10°50′E
- Country: Germany
- State: Saxony-Anhalt
- District: Harz
- Municipality: Nordharz

Area
  - Total: 16.06 km^{2} (6.20 sq mi)
- Elevation: 189 m (620 ft)

Population (2006-12-31)
  - Total: 1,273
  - Density: 79.27/km^{2} (205.3/sq mi)
- Time zone: UTC+01:00 (CET)
  - Summer (DST): UTC+02:00 (CEST)
- Postal codes: 38855
- Dialling codes: 039458
- Vehicle registration: HZ

Heudeber is a village and a former municipality in the district of Harz, in Saxony-Anhalt, Germany. Since 1 January 2010, it is part of the municipality Nordharz. The largest company in the town is Agroservice Landhandel GmbH.

== History ==
=== 20th Century ===
On 1 November 1928 Gutsbezirk Mulmke got united with the commune of Heudeber.

=== 21st Century ===
On 1 January 2010 following communes got together to the new municipality of Nordharz:

- Langeln
- Abbenrode
- Danstedt
- Schmatzfeld
- Stapelburg
- Veckenstedt
- Wasserleben
- Heudeber
