= Eckertal =

German Village

Coordinates: 51°53′48″N 10°38′59″E

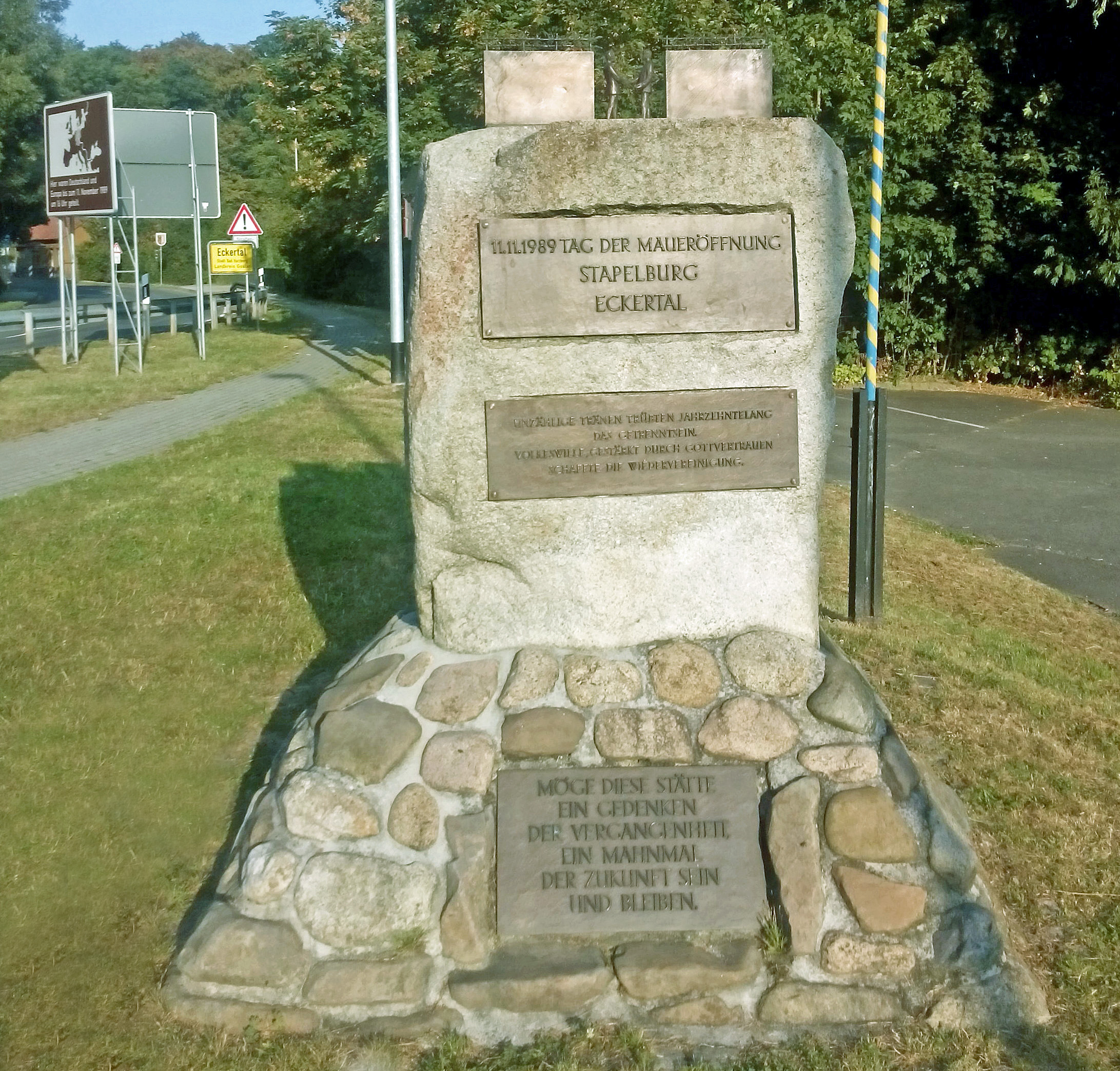
Memorial at the site of the former inner German border

Eckertal is a hamlet of about 160 inhabitants in Bad Harzburg in Lower Saxony, Germany.

== Location ==
The settlement is situated just north of the Harz mountain range at the entrance of the densely forested Ecker valley, about 8 km (5.0 mi) downstream of the Ecker Dam. Located on the rim of the Bad Harzburg municipal area, about 6 km (3.7 mi) east of the town centre, its direct neighbour is the village of Stapelburg, part of the Ilsenburg municipality in the state of Saxony-Anhalt. The parish is part of the Harz Nature Park; from here, the protected area of the Harz National Park stretches up to the Brocken massif in the south.

== History ==
The Ecker valley above the present-day settlement was the site of the medieval Ahlsburg fortress, an Imperial castle presumably erected in the 12th century. The picturesque vale was linked to public transport with the opening of the Wernigerode–Ilsenburg–Bad Harzburg railway line via Stapelburg and Eckertal on 1 October 1894. Two years later the Jungborn destination spa was founded in the Ecker valley, temporary home of notable guests like Franz Kafka in July 1912.

In the course of the German re-armament, the Luftwaffe forces in 1936 had a vast aircraft munitions depot (Luft-Munitionsanstalt, Muna) built on the railway line in the Schimmerwald forest northwest of the village. It was destroyed in the last days of World War II on 10 April 1945, when retiring German troops blew it up while US Army forces entered the region. The blast left severe damages in the surrounding villages and even destroyed window panes in the Bad Harzburg train station about 7 kilometres (4.3 mi) away. On the munitions site, which had an area of 270 ha, there were over 120 bunkers and a large number of bomb craters with a diameter of up to 60 metres (200 ft). The Lower Saxon bomb disposal service continued to work at Eckertal until 2011.

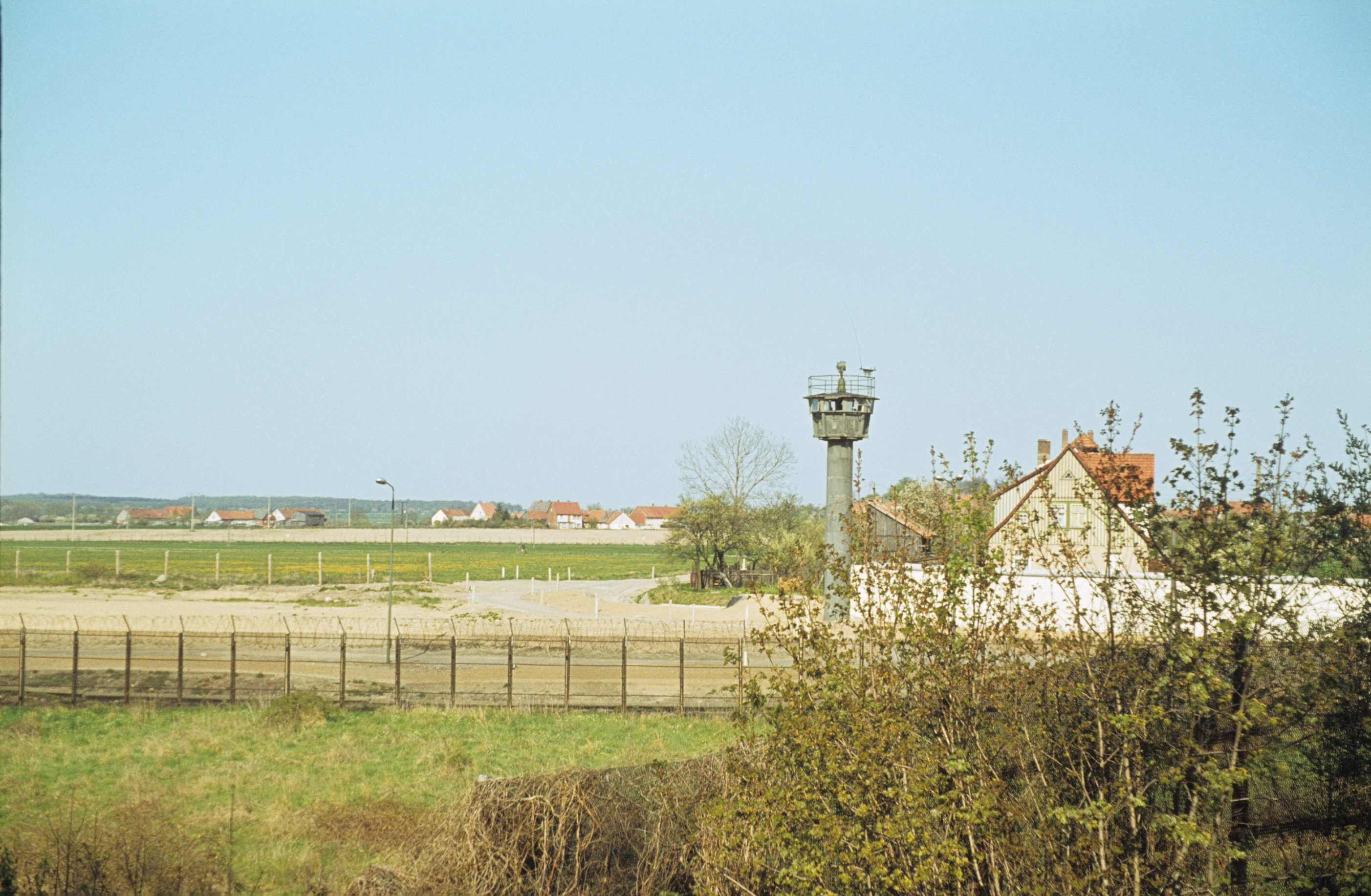
View over the border fortifications, c. 1980

During the period of the post-war division of Germany, Eckertal was the site where the Inner German border along the Ecker interrupted the Bundesstraße 6. Likewise, Eckertal became the terminus for trains from Bad Harzburg and the railway tracks were finally dismantled in the 1970s. A restaurant and an observation post overlooking the border installations were a popular destination for day-trippers.

After the Wall was opened on 9 November 1989 in Berlin, the inner German Border followed suit. On 11 November 1989 around 4.30 pm the highway was re-opened between Eckertal and Stapelburg. From a historic point of view this was the first new border crossing between East and West Germany in the process of reunification. Today a monument commemorates this event. It bears the inscription "Einigkeit und Recht und Freiheit für das Deutsche Vaterland" from the third stanza of the Deutschlandlied.
