= Halle–Vienenburg railway =

Railway line in Germany

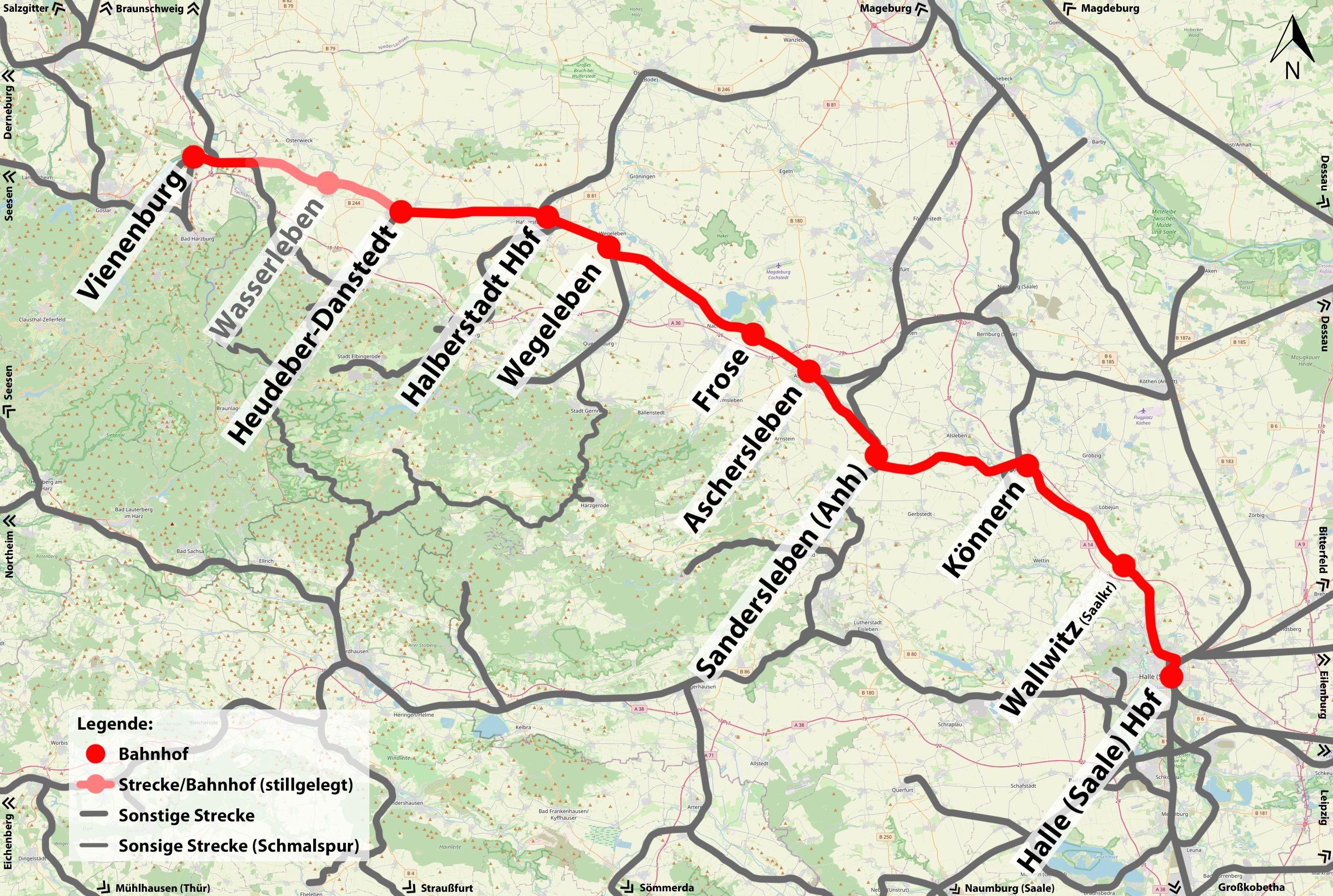

Overview
- Line number: 6344; 6346, 6050 (S-Bahn track)
- Locale: Saxony-Anhalt and Lower Saxony, Germany

Service
- Route number: 330

Technical
- Line length: 123.2 km (76.6 mi)
- Number of tracks: 2: (Aschersleben–Frose and Wegeleben–Halberstadt); 1: (elsewhere)
- Track gauge: 1,435 mm (4 ft 8 1/2 in) standard gauge
- Operating speed: Halle–Halberstadt: 160 km/h (99.4 mph) (max); Halberstadt–Vienenburg: 120 km/h (74.6 mph) (max)

The Halle–Vienenburg railway is a 123 kilometre long non-electrified main line north of the Harz Mountains in central Germany. It is an important connection between the metropolitan area of Halle (Saale) and the northern Harz mountains. It was opened in several sections between 1862 and 1872 by the Magdeburg–Halberstadt Railway Company (Magdeburg-Halberstädter Eisenbahngesellschaft, MHE) and is now maintained by DB Netz except for the disused section between Heudeber-Danstedt and Vienenburg. Since 1996, traffic between Heudeber-Danstedt and Vienenburg has used the railway via Wernigerode running further to the south.

Between Halle Hauptbahnhof and Halle-Trotha, a single-track electrified line of the S-Bahn Mitteldeutschland runs parallel to the Halle–Halberstadt railway, but there is no connection between the lines in Halle-Trotha.

== History ==
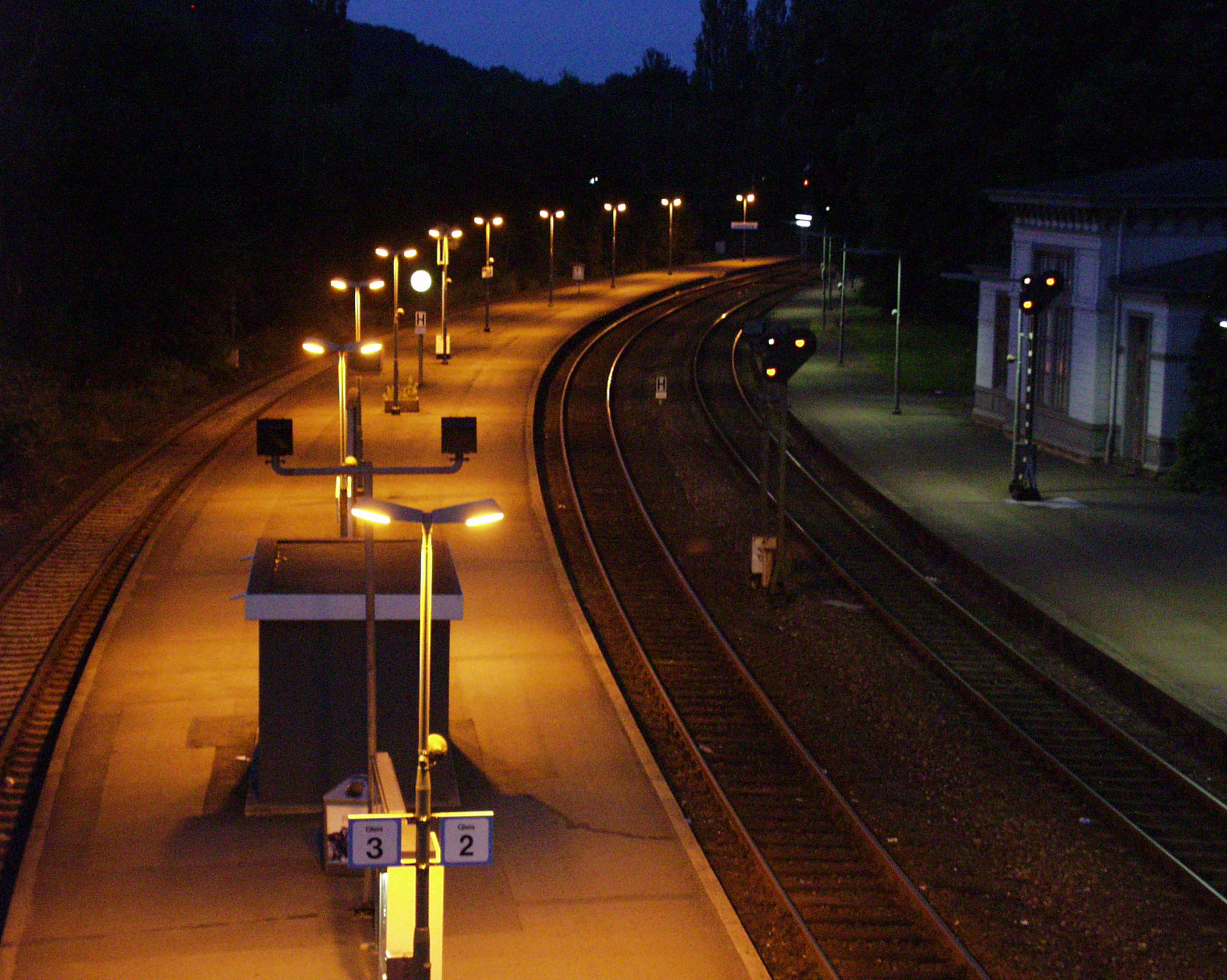
Vienenburg station

As early as 1841 and 1843 respectively, Vienenburg and Halberstadt were connected to the railway network. Likewise, in 1843 the line from Oschersleben via Jerxheim to Wolfenbüttel was taken into service, as a result of which one could travel by rail between Vienenburg and Halberstadt, albeit on a route running a long way to the north. Nevertheless, there were further plans for a railway close to the Harz Mountains, that would run westwards from Halberstadt.

The first section, from Halberstadt to Wegeleben, was opened in 1862 along with the Halberstadt–Thale railway. Only three years later the Wegeleben-Aschersleben section went into service.

In 1864 a state treaty between Prussia and the Brunswick was agreed that envisaged a railway line from Halberstadt to Vienenburg. A reasonably level route was chosen, at some distance from the Harz, running via Heudeber-Danstedt and Wasserleben. The Kingdom of Hanover, on whose territory Vienenburg was located, initially rejected this scheme however. Not until Prussia's victory in the Austro-Prussian War and the resulting annexation of Hanover could the Magdeburg-Halberstadt Railway Company (MHE) begin work on its construction in 1867. On 1 March 1869 the line was taken into service. Two years beforehand the MHE had opened the eastern extension of the railway towards Halle (Saale). In 1871, this line was extended to the neighbouring village of Könnern, and, in 1872, the last section to Halle (Saale) was completed.

In 1875, the line from Vienenburg to Hildesheim, in the shape of the Vienenburg–Langelsheim railway, also opened and, with that, the direct line from Halle to Hanover was complete.

Long-distance passenger services were moved after the nationalisation of the MHE to the more northerly lines of the Prussian state railways, but the line retained significance for long-distance freight traffic.

During World War II, traffic increased further as the route was an important part of the connection between the Ruhr and central Germany. The line suffered almost no damage during the Second World War but, as a result of the division of Germany, it was cut in 1945 between Vienenburg on the West German side and Wasserleben on the East German side, and later dismantled.

After the Wende there were attempts to reactivate the link between Halberstadt and Vienenburg. But because the line missed out larger towns like Wernigerode and Ilsenburg, the decision went in favour of the southern route, the Heudeber-Danstedt–Ilsenburg railway. Until 1945 this had also crossed the state border, to Bad Harzburg.

Because the trackbed of the old line was no longer usable in the area of Bad Harzburg, the Deutsche Bahn decided to build the new line, which branches off the old one at Stapelburg and runs northwards to the Halberstadt–Vienenburg route. Just before the state border it rejoins the old route and follows it to Vienenburg. Because the line uses the old trackbed on Lower Saxon soil, the project could be viewed locally as a renovation of an existing line, which enabled the installation of level crossings. On 2 June 1996 the new section, approximately 10 kilometres long, was opened. Since then passenger trains between Halberstadt and Vienenburg have used the Halberstadt–Heudeber-Danstedt section of the old line and the three kilometre long section on Lower Saxony territory, but otherwise they run along the southern route via Ilsenburg and Wernigerode.

Passenger trains were still using the section of line between Heudeber-Danstedt and Wasserleben until 28 September 2002, continuing along the track of the former Osterwieck-Wasserleben Railway to Osterwieck. Thereafter services were withdrawn and, by 30 June 2003, the line was closed by the Federal Railway Office.

At the end of the 1990s the Halle–Halberstadt section was completely converted in order to enable it to handle tilting trains with a top speed of 160 km/h. The entire control and safety equipment was modernised (including the installation of an electronic signal box at Sandersleben), the track layouts of many stations were reduced to the minimum necessary. Several stations were abandoned completely.

The line from Halberstadt via Wernigerode to Vienenburg was converted in 2007 to take trains using tilting technology. In the new 2008 timetable, journey times shortened again due to the completion of renovation work.

== Rail services ==
The Deutsche Bahn's Regional Express trains (HarzExpress) work the line every two hours between Halle, Halberstadt and Hanover, stopping at all stations, as do local services on the North Harz Network (Nordharznetz) operated by Veolia Verkehr Sachsen-Anhalt. At weekends Veolia runs an excursion service between Berlin and Wernigerode that uses the Halberstadt–Heudeber-Danstedt section.

The stations between Halle (Saale) Hauptbahnhof and Halle-Trotha are on a separate track operated as part of line S7 of the S-Bahn Mitteldeutschland.

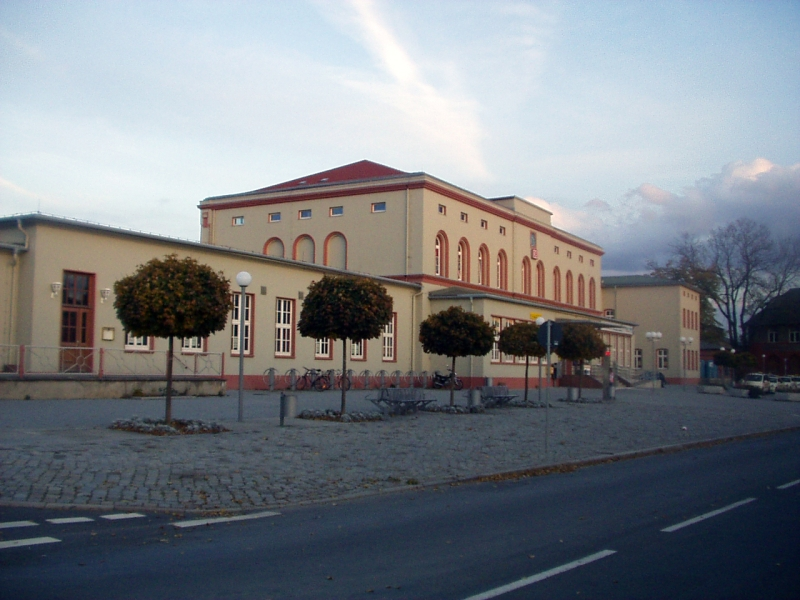
Aschersleben station

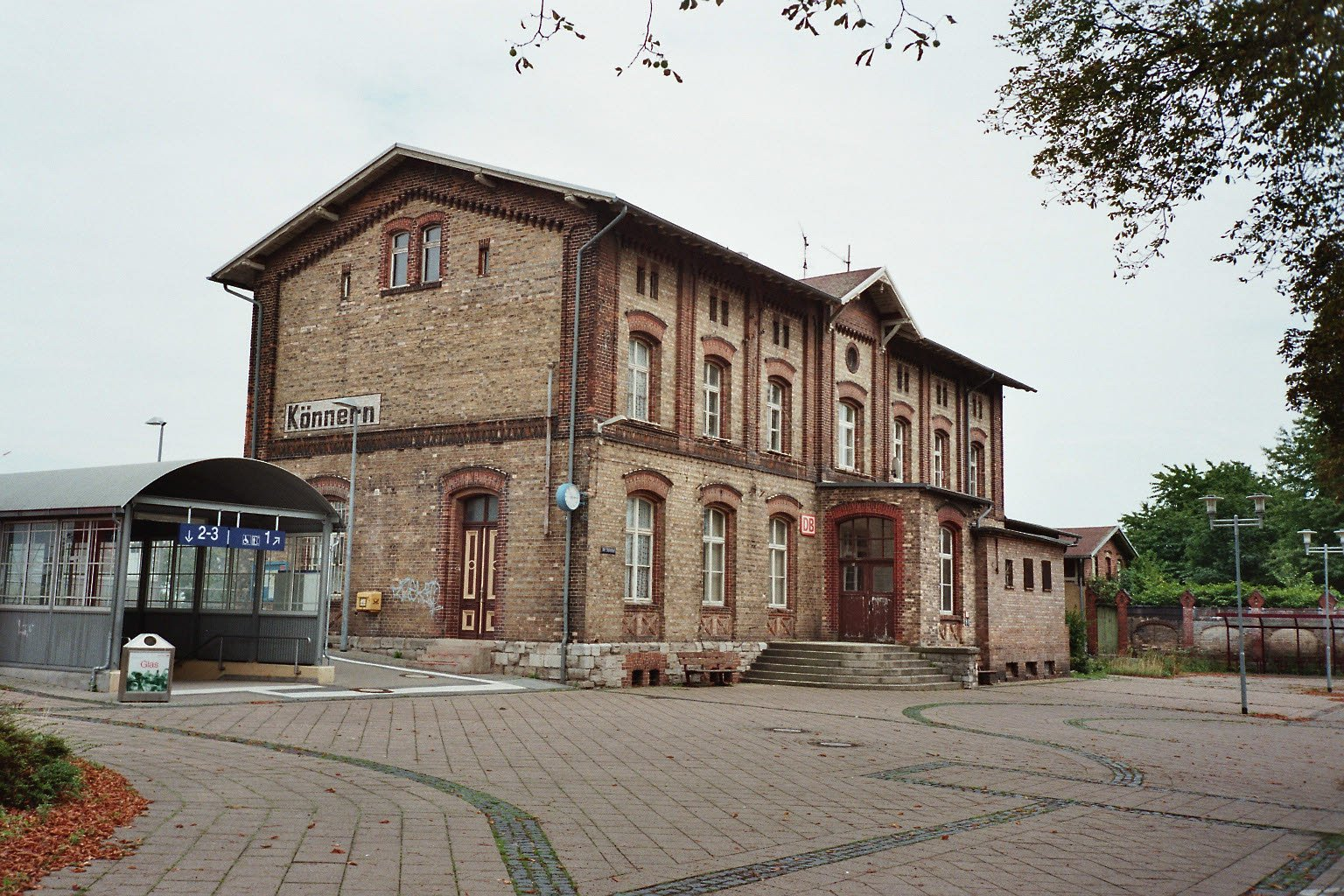
Könnern station

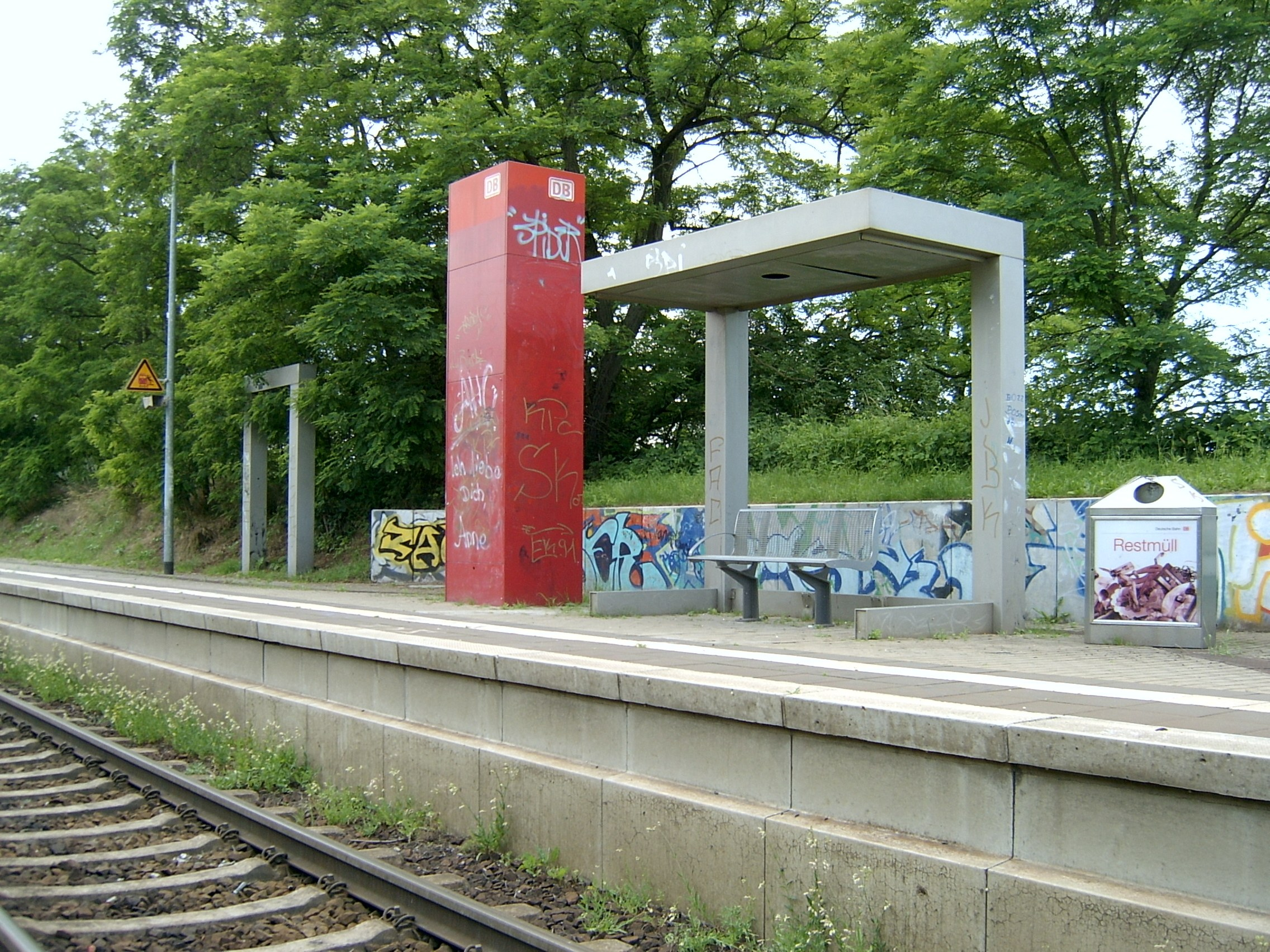
Teicha halt
