= Hildesheim–Goslar railway =

Railway line in Germany

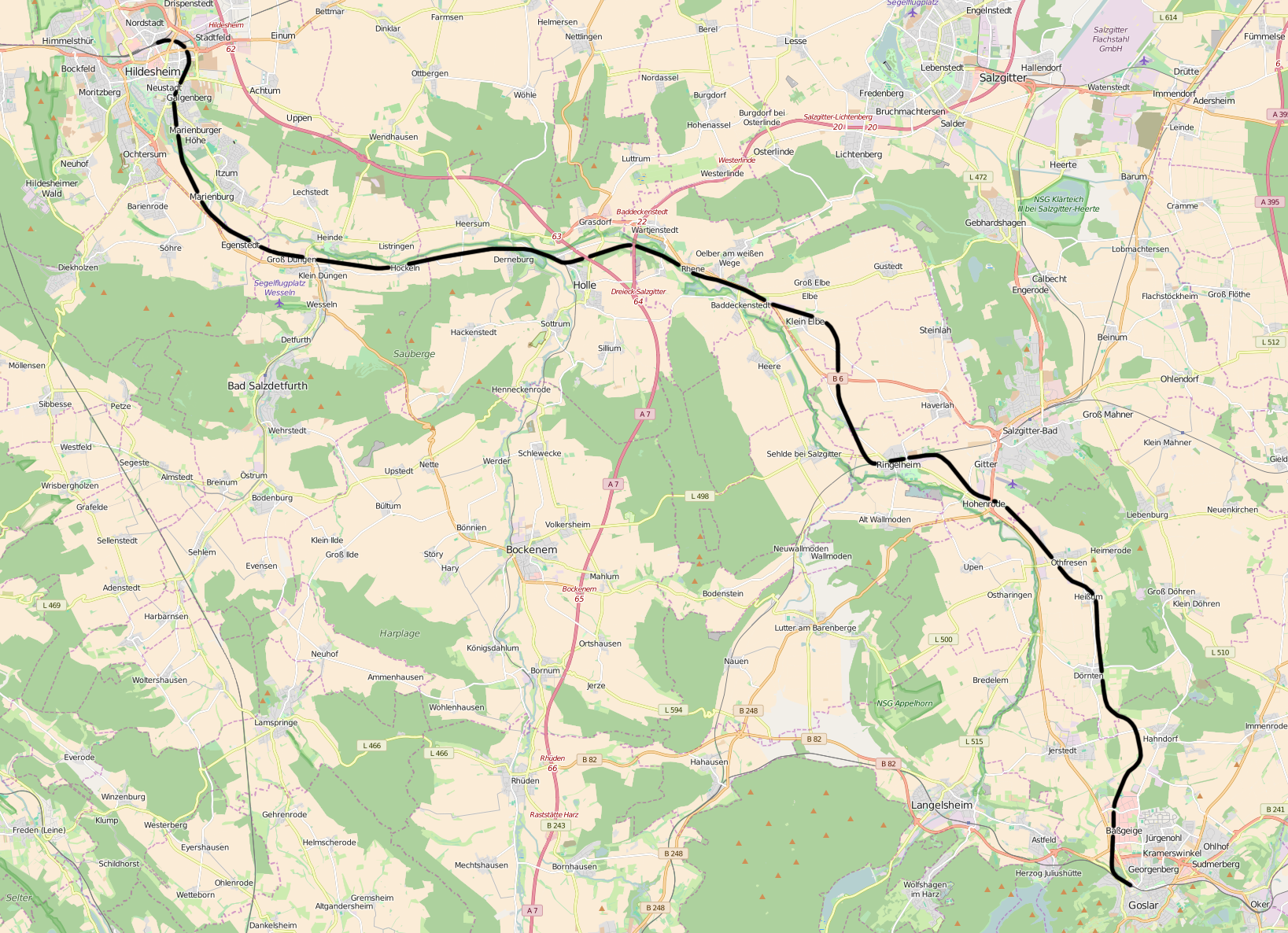

Overview
- Line number: 1773
- Locale: Lower Saxony, Germany

Service
- Route number: 320

Technical
- Line length: 53.4 km (33.2 mi)
- Track gauge: 1,435 mm (4 ft 8 1/2 in) standard gauge
- Operating speed: 160 km/h (99 mph) (max)

The Hildesheim–Goslar railway is a 53 kilometre long, double-track and non-electrified main line in the northern Harz foothills in the German state of Lower Saxony. It serves mainly to connect with the tourist region in the northern Harz (Goslar, Bad Harzburg and Wernigerode) with Hildesheim and Hanover. It is served by the HarzExpress, running between Halle, Halberstadt, Goslar and Hannover Hauptbahnhof. The most important station and junction of the line is Salzgitter-Ringelheim station.

== Route ==
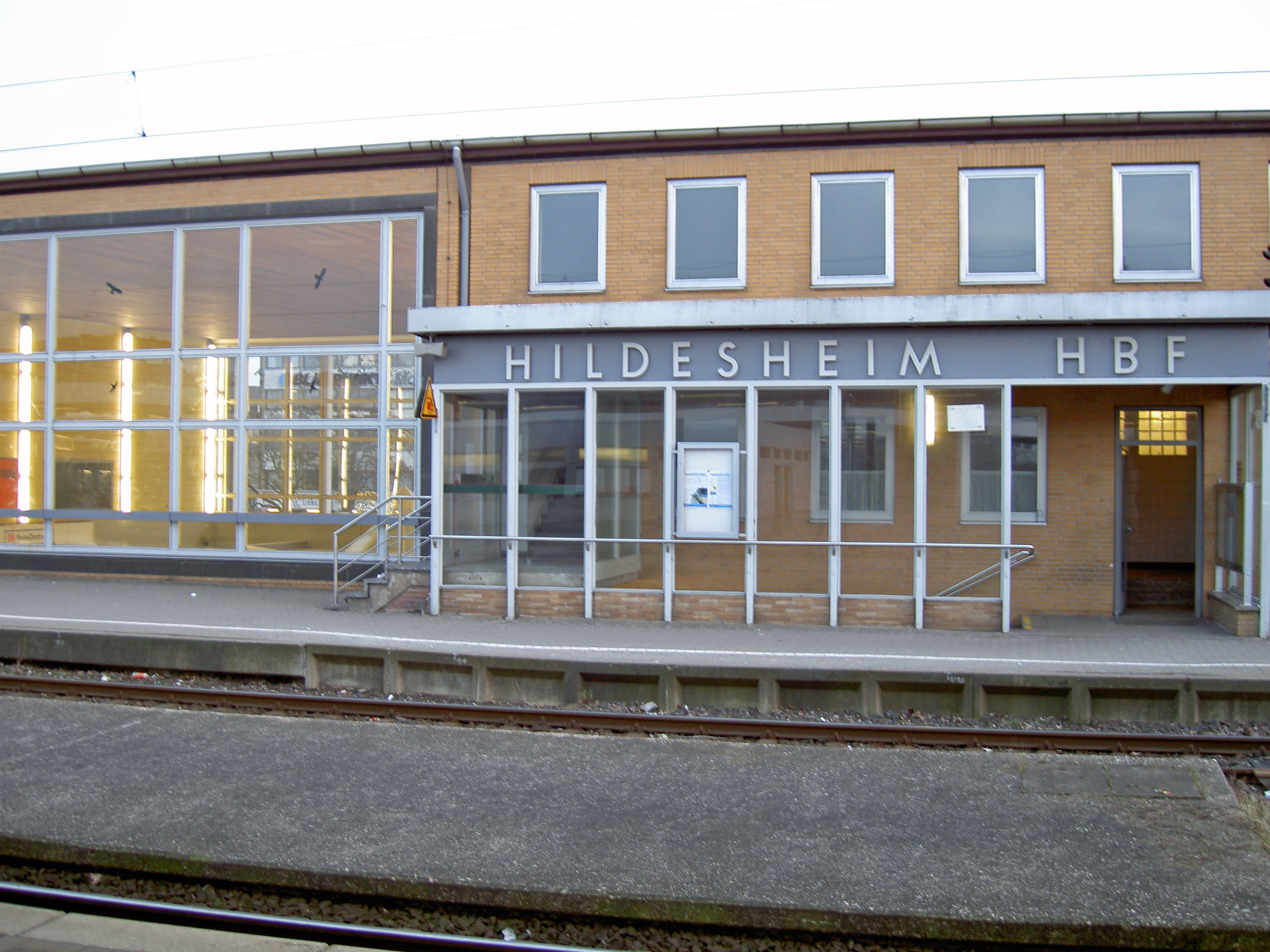
Hildesheim Hauptbahnhof

The line runs out of Hildesheim mostly towards the south-east along the Innerste river. The occasional designation of the route as the Innerstebahn (Innerste Valley Railway) is not officially used as it leads to confusion with the now closed Innerste Valley Railway between Langelsheim and Altenau, which was further upstream. In Groß Düngen, the Lamme Valley Railway branches off. In Derneburg, there was a connection to the former Brunswick–Seesen railway of the Brunswick State Railway Company. It continues through Baddeckenstedt and crosses the Brunswick Southern Railway at Salzgitter-Ringelsheim station. From about Othfresen it leaves the Innerste and runs through the former Grauhof junction to Goslar.

== History ==
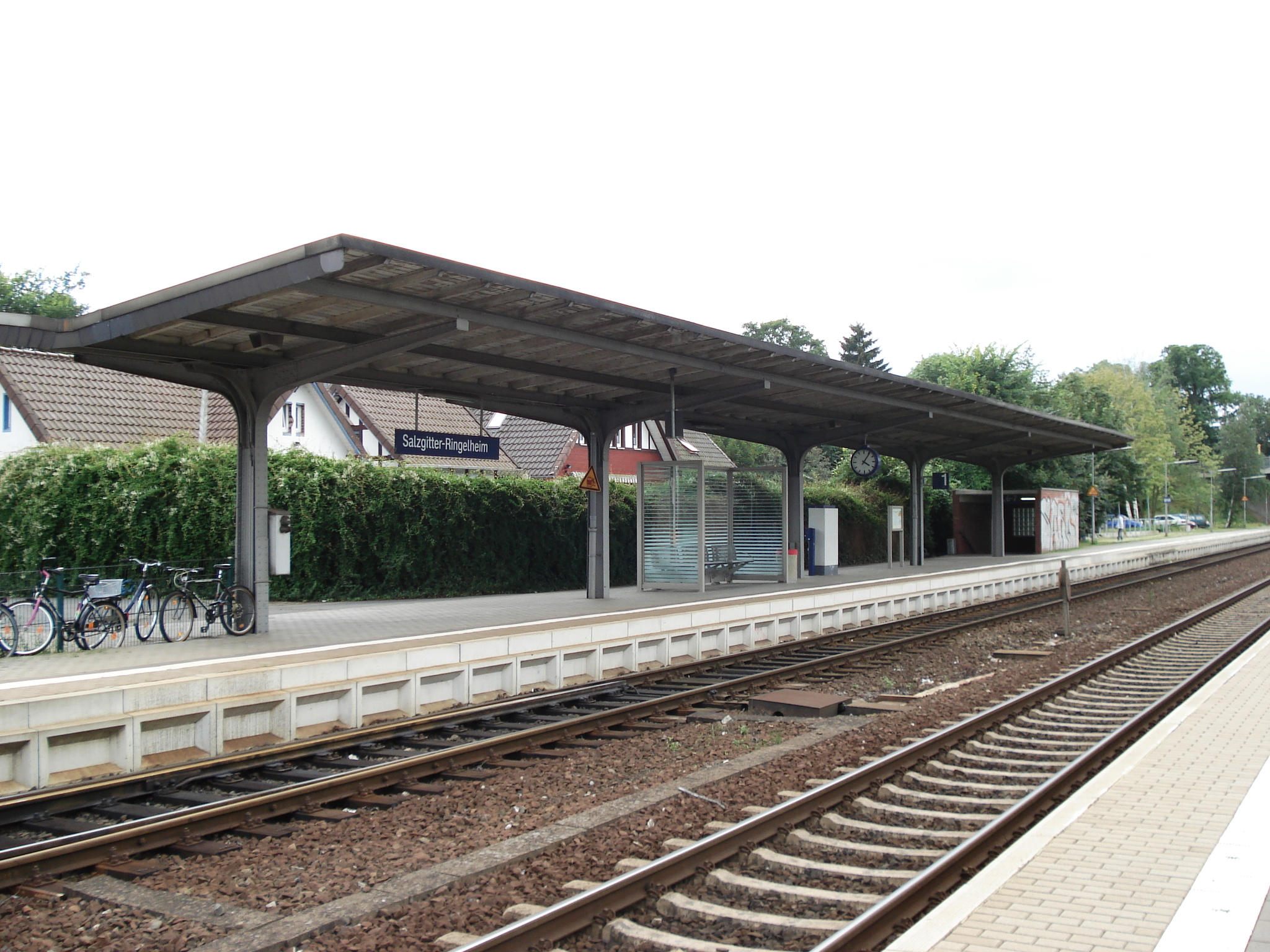
The rebuilt platform towards Goslar in Salzgitter-Ringelheim station

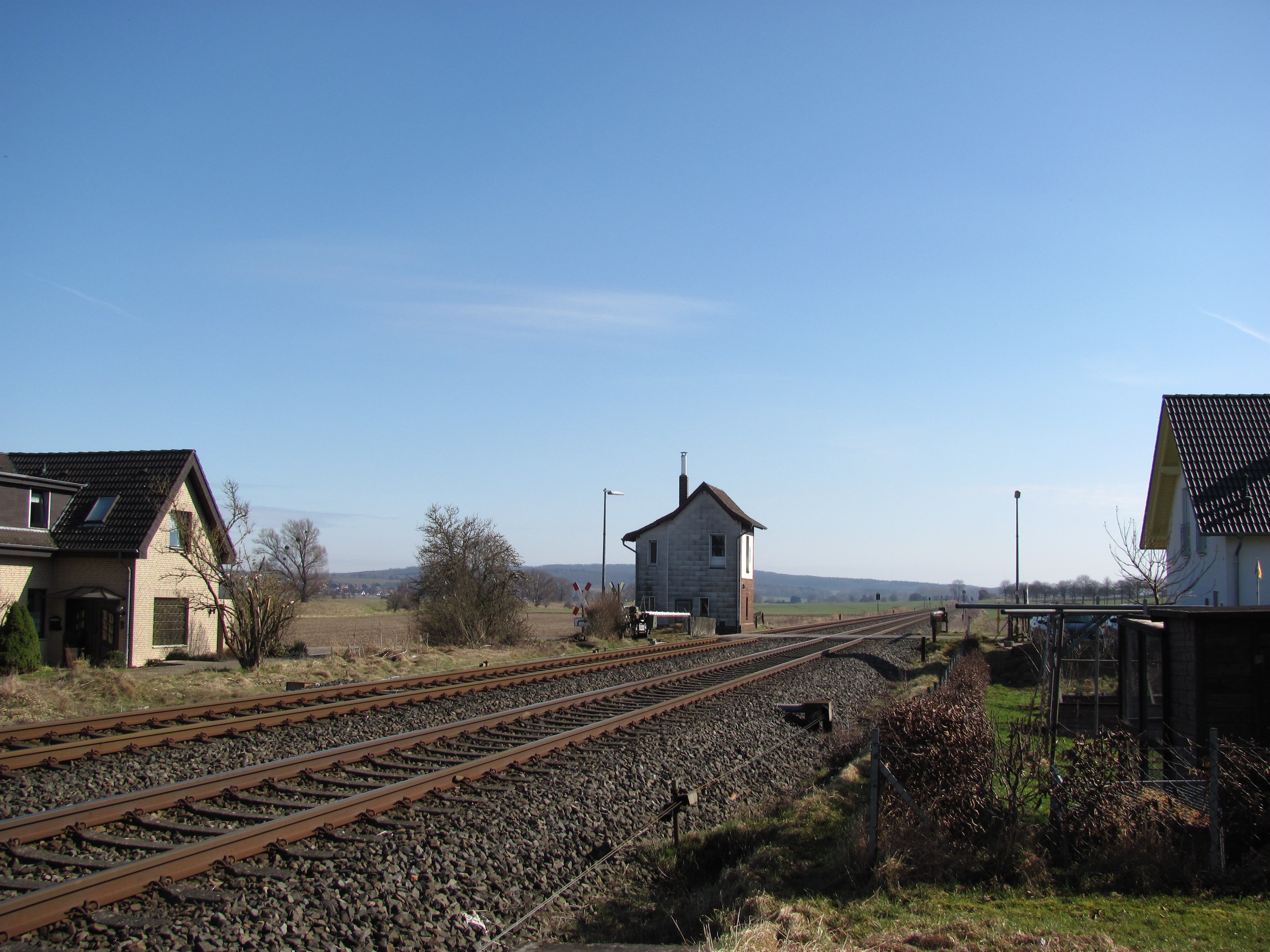
Gatekeeper's house in Hockeln

Even before the War of 1866, which effectively led to the abolition of the national borders between the Kingdom of Hanover, the Duchy of Brunswick and the Kingdom of Prussia, the Magdeburg–Halberstadt Railway Company (German: Magdeburg-Halberstädter Eisenbahngesellschaft, MHE) sought a connection from Halberstadt to the west. The first goal was to obtain a connection towards Kreiensen via Vienenburg. Operations began on the Halberstadt–Vienenburg railway in 1869. From there, the line via Grauhof and Langelsheim was built from 1875 to 1877, continuing to Neuekrug-Hahausen (on the Brunswick Southern Railway) and as the Innerste Valley Railway to Clausthal.

Approximately at the same time, the Hanover-Altenbeken Railway Company (Hannover-Altenbekener Eisenbahn-Gesellschaft, HAE) planned a connection to the east, bypassing the cities of Hanover and Brunswick. In 1875, it completed the Elze–Löhne railway (known as the Weserbahn or Weser Railway) from Löhne via Hamelin to Elze on the existing Hanoverian Southern Railway, which connected to the Lehrte–Nordstemmen railway to Hildesheim. It signed a contract with the MHE to build a line from Hildesheim to Grauhof and connect there. However, the HAE got into economic difficulties, so the project had to be taken over by the MHE. Freight was carried from Hildesheim via Grauhof to Vienenburg on 19 May 1875 and passenger traffic commenced on 30 June. On 1 May 1883, the Brunswick Railway, the successor to the privatized Brunswick State Railway, opened an extension to Goslar. At the same time the gap between Goslar and Langelsheim was closed.

The line soon became part of a long-distance connection from the Netherlands and northern Westphalia via Löhne, Hildesheim and Halberstadt to Halle and Leipzig, continuing to some extent to the parts of the German Empire that are now in Poland and the Czech Republic. Freight traffic took the direct connection from Grauhof to Vienenburg, while passenger trains ran via Goslar and from 1912 also continued via Bad Harzburg and Wernigerode. In addition, rail services slowly increased for vacationers travelling from Hamburg and Bremen via Hanover to Goslar; some of these also conveyed through coaches via Halberstadt to Berlin.

Through traffic ended with the division of Germany after the Second World War. In 1956, the line from Grauhof to Vienenburg was abandoned. However, the northern connection from the Harz to Hanover and Hamburg, served by D-Zug expresses and later InterRegio services, remained.

== Passenger services ==
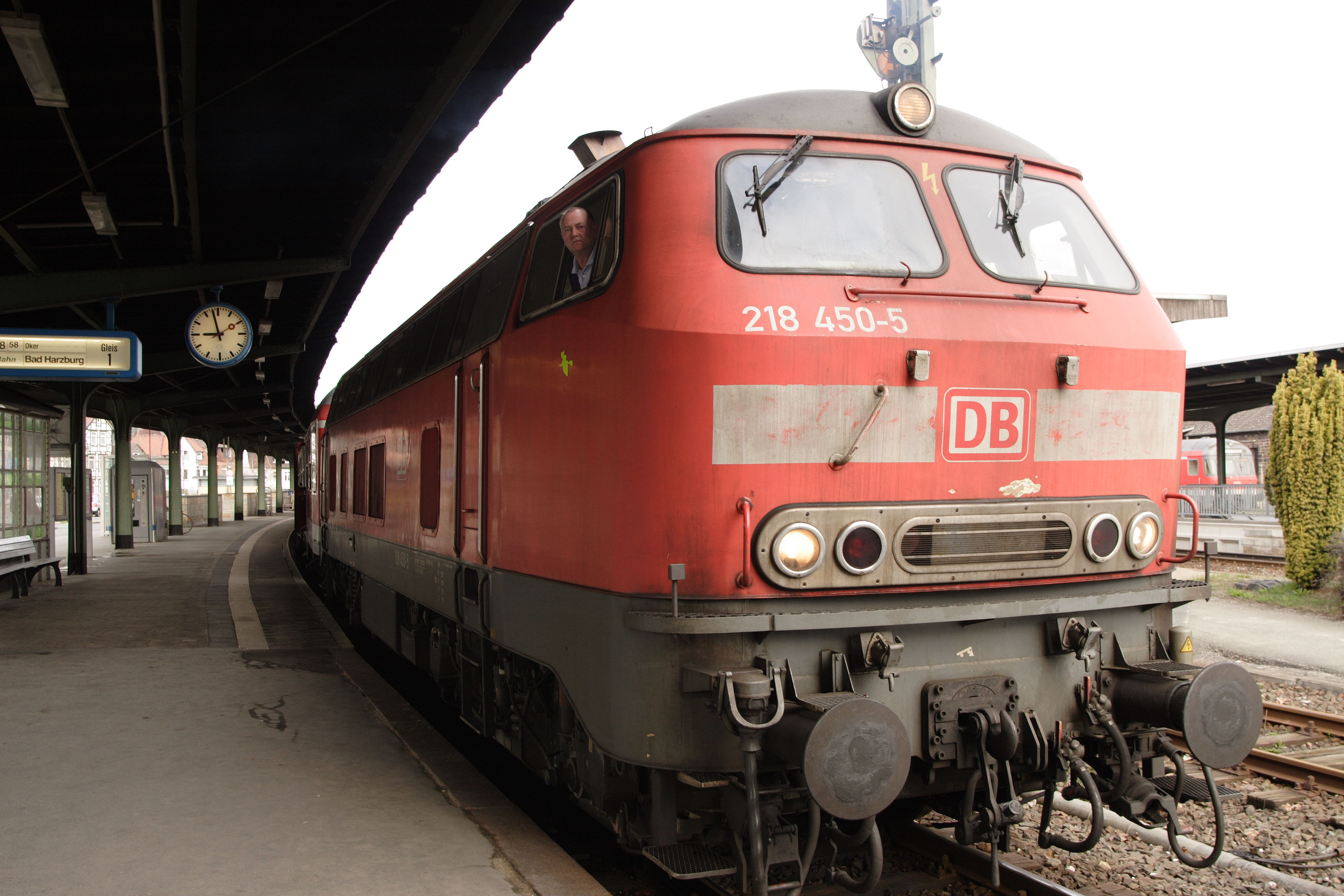
Local service from Hanover to Bad Harzburg via Goslar

Since the reopening of the Heudeber-Danstedt–Bad Harzburg/Vienenburg railway (including the construction of some new line) in 1996, a service has run to Halberstadt and Halle. This route was served from the beginning with a Regional-Express service on the Hanover–Goslar–Halberstadt–Halle route. For Expo 2000, the Goslar–Hildesheim line was developed for the operation of class 612 tilting diesel multiple units. There are also other local services between Bad Harzburg and Hanover, which serve all stations except Groß Düngen station; Groß Düngen is served only by trains on the Lamme Valley Railway and some trains in the morning towards Hildesheim. Passengers to Hildesheim can use the Regional-Express service from Goslar. An InterRegio service ended after Expo 2000, since then only regional services have run on the line.
