= Rudolf Pleil =

German serial killer

- Born: Rudolf Pleil; 7 July 1924; Bärenstein, Erzgebirgskreis, Germany
- Died: 18 February 1958 (aged 33); Celle, West Germany
- Cause of death: Suicide by hanging
- Other name: The Deathmaker
- Convictions: Murder (9 counts); Manslaughter
- Penalty: Life imprisonment

Details
- Victims: 10–25
- Span of crimes: 1946–1947
- Country: Germany
- Date apprehended: April 1947

Rudolf Pleil (7 July 1924 – 18 February 1958) was a German serial killer known as Der Totmacher (literally: "The Deadmaker"). He was convicted of killing a salesman and nine women, but claimed to have killed 25 people. Many of his crimes took place in the Harz mountain range.

== Early life ==
Pleil was born on 7 July 1924, in a small village close to the border of the former Czechoslovakia. His father was an industrial worker and communist. After the seizure of control by the Nazis, he was arrested and then moved with his family to the neighbouring Czech town of Vejprty. At the age of nine, Pleil had to support his parents through border smuggling and was repeatedly arrested. He did not attend school regularly because he had to earn money for his unemployed parents and his sister. His brother died prematurely and his older sister submitted to forced sterilization due to her epilepsy, according to Nazi law. At the age of 13, he had his first sexual experience with a prostitute.

In 1939, when he was 15, he left home and began working as a butcher, but quit after a few weeks. He worked as a shipboy on barges on the Elbe and Oder. Here too, he operated smaller, illegal businesses. In the summer of 1939, he was hired as a machine boy on a merchant ship to South America. After the beginning of the Second World War, he came to the Kriegsmarine, where he was sentenced to one year in prison for theft. On 26 October 1943, he was found unfit for service due to epileptic seizures. After his dismissal worked as a waiter, he continued to suffer from seizures, which is why, according to a medical report, he was supposed to be sterilized. A bomb attack destroyed the operating room a few days before the scheduled appointment. Pleil had previously fathered an illegitimate child, which was taken care of by his sister.

== Murders ==
Pleil became a cook in a labor camp, where he killed and ate cats. After the invasion of the Red Army, he was hired as an auxiliary policeman in his home village. During this time he claimed that in his hometown to have shot and killed a drunken looting Soviet soldier while robbing him. However, he managed to escape punishment for this crime, as local residents helped bury the body in the forest. Pleil married a young woman whom he had impregnated. Around the same time, he began sexually assaulting women at night. He admitted to having committed murders as early as 1945, but this could not be proven.

After the war, he worked as a sales representative, eventually starting his own small business on the side; he was soon fired, however, and his enterprise went out of business. In 1946, he moved from Zöblitz to Zorge in the southern Harz.

Between 1946 and 1947, Pleil worked as a frontier worker in the Harz and helped paying people, mostly women, to cross illegally to East and West. In these two years he raped and murdered at least 12 women, with help from two accomplices, Karl Hoffmann and Konrad Schüßler. On April 18, 1947, Pleil was arrested after the robbery of the Hamburg businessman Hermann Bennen, whose body, dismembered by axe blows, was found in the creek Zorgebach.

=== Murders ===
From 1945 to 1950, 13 police officers were murdered in the border area of this region, which led to the fact that police went on patrol only in groups. It was not difficult for frontier workers such as Pleil and his two accomplices to evade the patrols, especially as police authority ended at the zonal border. In addition, individual police departments, such as the Kriminalpolizei and the police, did not cooperate effectively. So it came to an investigation of murders of women at the border area to a more serious one, as a Schutzpolizist from Vienenburg reported that body parts were found in a well there. In fact, the corpses of two women whom Pleil had killed on that mountain were also found. Pleil and his accomplices killed at least three other women before they were arrested. When Pleil worked in a Celle prison as an executioner, he boasted that he had prior experience with killing, and had left two of his victims in the Vienenburg Well. Shortly afterwards, he was arrested and charged with the murders of several women in the border area.

Pleil was ultimately convicted of several murders:

==== 1946 ====
- Erica M., 32 years old. She was raped, robbed and killed by blows to the head.
- On 19 July, he sexually assaulted and killed an unknown approximately 25-year-old woman in the forest between Walkenried and Ellrich on the edge of southern Harz. He used a hammer to kill her. (Body found near forest road).
- On 19 August, Pleil and his accomplice Karl Hoffmann lured an unknown 25-year-old woman to the grounds of the freight depot in the Upper Franconian border town of Hof. Hoffmann stabbed her in the head with his knife while raping her, before slitting her throat. It was dropped to the bottom of a seven-meter well near the railway station. It was discovered on 20 August 1946.
- On 2 September, Pleil and Hoffmann met a 25-year-old woman "Inga X" crossing the border at Bergen. Pleil killed her with a fieldstone, and Hoffmann buried the body in the forest. It was discovered in the undergrowth near a country road on 4 September 1946
- In mid-September, Pleil and Hoffmann met a 25-year-old Black woman "Frau X" from Trappstadt who was going towards the zonal border. Hoffmann robbed and killed her in the nearby forest, decapitating her corpse afterwards. It was discovered in the forest on 9 November 1946, a month after the disappearance.
- At the end of November, Pleil offered to guide a 25-year-old young woman "Krista 3" across the border. In the forest between Ellrich and Walkenried, he suffered from a strong alcoholized epileptic seizure. When he came to, the girl lay next to him, dead. It was discovered in November 1946.
- On 12 December, Pleil and Schüßler robbed a 55-year-old widow near Nordhausen and beat her with clubs. The woman survived this attack, and was a crucial witness in the trial.
- On 14 December, Pleil killed a 37-year-old woman in the guard booth of Vienenburg in the presence of Schüßler, then threw her body in a well. Five days later, he killed a 44-year-old widow, also throwing her body in the well.

==== 1947 ====
- On 16 January, Pleil and Hoffmann offered a 20-year-old woman "Margot M" to take her to the East Zone. Pleil killed her near the road that runs between Abbenrode and Stapelburg. He then disposed of the corpse in a stream. It was discovered on 17 January 1947.
- In mid-February, Pleil killed a 49-year-old woman "Frau S" in a forest near Dudersieben, with Hoffmann robbing the corpse. Death from severe skull damage made with an iron rod, and rape. It was found in the woods under a stack of firewood in February 1947.
- At the beginning of March, Pleil and Hoffmann committed another murder near Zorge in the Soviet occupation zone. Hoffmann stabbed an unknown young woman to death and then cut off her head [found]. Her body was later found in the British sector.

The beginning of the trial in the district court of Brunswick was set for 31 October 1950. Pleil had already been sentenced to 12 years in prison on a manslaughter charge by the Landgericht Braunschweig.

== Background to the arrest ==
The most frequent references to Rudolf Pleil came from the Harz, but also in other regions, one knew about him and pointed towards this person. A resident of Hof, who maintained a small pension for returnees in the 1940s and was informed about the conditions on the border, thought that he still had an impressive memory of Pleil.

Pleil's arrest was initially arrested for killing Hermann Bennen during a physical altercation at a border crossing; Pleil had killed Bennen with a hatchet. Bennen was his second male victim. The court found him guilty of manslaughter, as he was heavily intoxicated at the time. If he had been found guilty of murder, he could have received a death sentence, as the West German judiciary still permitted capital punishment at the time. The remaining crimes remained unsolved, for which the police and judicial authorities shared a superficial approach. The fact that many of the victims were not from the area was also considered, as they were often people uprooted as a result of the war and post-war conditions.

While in custody in Celle, Pleil finally confessed to further murders. In a memoir titled Mein Kampf - after Adolf Hitler’s autobiography - he claimed to have committed a total of 25 murders, and thus one more than Fritz Haarmann. In the book, he referred to himself as the "greatest murderer".

=== The accomplices ===
- Karl Hoffmann, born in 1913 in Hausdorf, was a tailor of women's clothing by profession. He was considered brutal and callous, and killed to get stolen goods. He died in prison in 1976.
- Konrad Schüßler, from Leukersdorf, was an 18-year-old butcher. He was pardoned in the late 1970s.

== Trial ==
The German press covered the trial of Pleil and his accomplices extensively, and it eventually drew international media coverage as well. Pleil enjoyed the attention and talked to several reporters, often exaggerating his crimes. The smiling Pleil confessed in the so-called "Brunswick trial" to the murders of several women, boasting to have allegedly committed a total of 40 murders.

During the trial, Pleil claimed to suffer from mental illness, in the hopes of being institutionalized in lieu of prison. This ploy was unsuccessful, however; three weeks after the start of the trial, on 17 November 1950, Pleil and his two accomplices were each sentenced to life imprisonment for multiple murders.

== Death ==
On 16 February 1958, Pleil hanged himself in his cell.

== Witnesses and later analysis ==
- Jutta Schultz, at the time a stenographer, described it as follows: Pleil was then only slightly older than she was, and yet it was not possible to estimate his true age. His hair was already very thin, he wore small round glasses and spoke only broken German. However, she noticed that he always had a small folder with him, in which he apparently took notes. He also appeared very self-confident and stated that he was the "dead man". She later said that she did not believe his claims of mental illness: "He was a sadist and has every action before exactly adjusted: I find myself a woman, robbing her and then I make her cold. That was his logic. The guy knew exactly what he was doing."
- Erich Helmer, a former prison chaplain, remembered that he was allowed to visit Pleil only under official supervision, as Pleil was considered dangerous. Helmer recalled that during one such visit, Pleil sat in his cell crying and showed him a letter from England in which Christian women wrote that they were praying for him. On that day, Pleil gave Helmer three notebooks, in which he had written a kind of autobiography entitled Mein Kampf - in which he boasted of having committed 25 murders. Another notebook bore the title “Without mercy I will kill the child and the old man, and after a hundred years one should still speak of me”.
- The criminal psychologist Ulrich Zander said in his analysis of Pleil that he was not stupid, but rather very devious. He examined a letter from Pleil and described it as showing a clear picture of Pleil's narcissism and egomania, particularly in his boasting of having a “special talent” as a "deadmaker".
- In 2007, filmmaker Hans-Dieter Rutsch directed the documentary film Der Totmacher Rudolf Pleil about the life of Rudolf Pleil for the Das Erste series Die großen Kriminalfälle.
- Hella Mock, the daughter of one of Pleil's victims, tells in a newspaper article about her mother's diaries.

== Literature ==
- Wolfgang Ullrich: The case of Rudolf Pleil and comrades. In: Archive for Criminology, Volume 123, 1959, pp. 36–44, 101–110.
- Christian Zentner : Illustrated history of the Adenauer era. Munich 1984, ISBN 3-517-00845-1 , p 92ff.
- Gerhard Feix: Death came by mail. From the history of the FRG-Kripo. Publisher Das Neue, Berlin 1988, ISBN 3-360-00197-4.
- Hans Pfeiffer: The compulsion to the series - serial murderers without mask, Militzke publishing house, OA (1996), ISBN 3-86189-729-6, (on- line (P. 163 ff.)), Retrieved on May 30, 2014
- Kathrin Kompisch, Frank Otto: Monster for the masses the Germans and their serial killers. Militzke, Leipzig 2004, ISBN 3-86189-722-9.
- Kathrin Kompisch, Frank Otto: devil in human form. The Germans and their serial killers. Bastei-Lübbe, Bergisch Gladbach 2006, ISBN 3-404-60571-3.
- Reinhold Albert, Hans-Jürgen Salier: The "Deadmaker" Rudolf Pleil. In: border experiences compact: the border regime between South Thuringia and Bavaria / Hessen from 1945 to 1990. Leipzig / Hildburghausen 2009, ISBN 978-3-939611-35-6, P. 277ff.
- Does the herring have a soul? In: Der Spiegel. No. 29, 1958 (online - Pleil Memoiren).
- Wiltrud Wehner-Davin: The case Rudolf Pleil, Totmacher aD, in: Kriminalistik - independent journal for the criminal science and practice 1985, pp. 339–341.

== See also ==
- Fritz Haarmann
- List of serial killers by number of victims
- List of German serial killers
