= Heudeber-Danstedt–Bad Harzburg/Vienenburg railway =

Railway line in Germany

Heudeber-Danstedt–Bad Harzburg railway (old route)
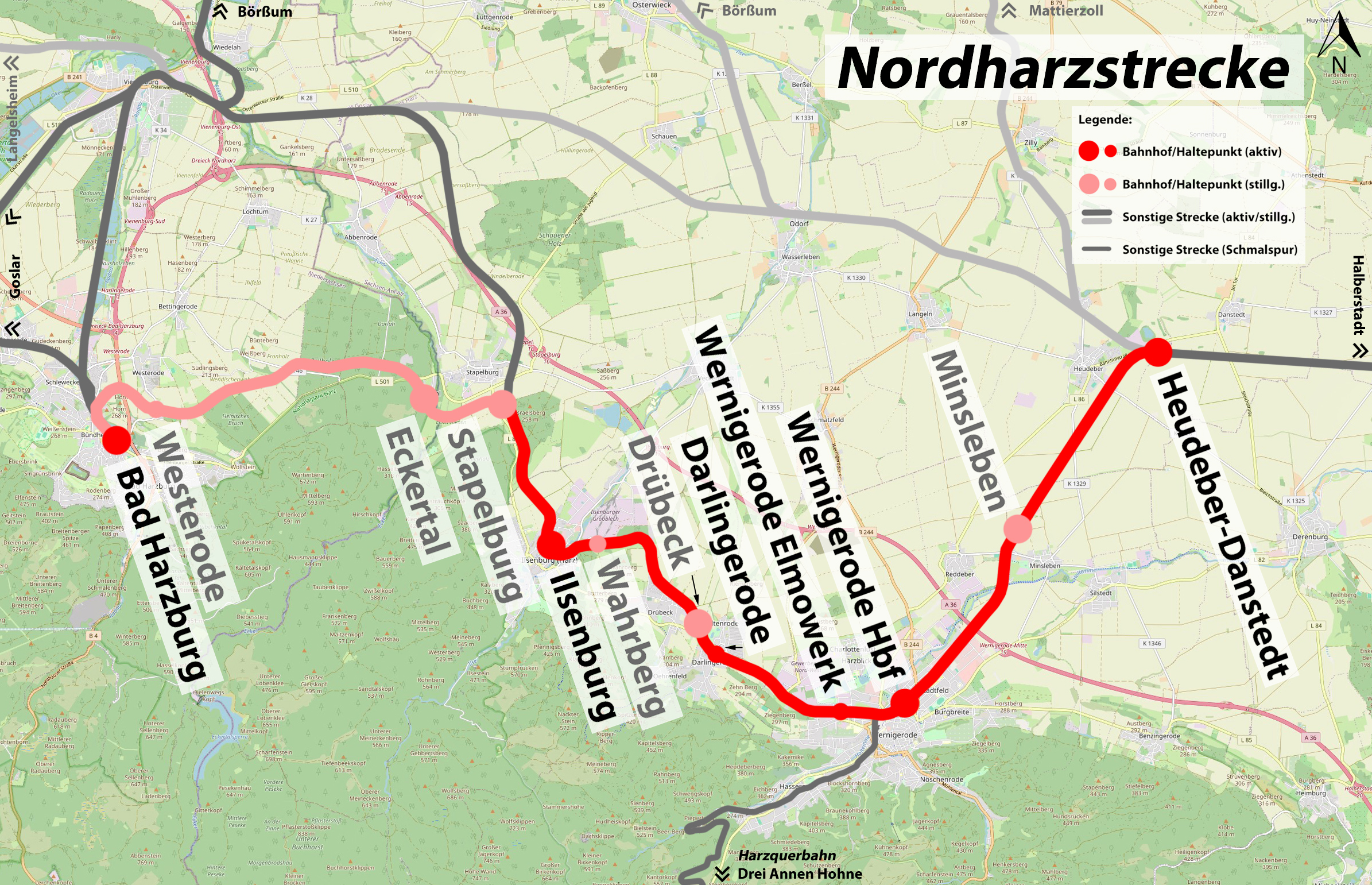

Overview
- Line number: 6425
- Locale: Saxony-Anhalt and Lower Saxony, Germany

Service
- Route number: 330

Technical
- Line length: 32.2 km (20.0 mi)
- Track gauge: 1,435 mm (4 ft 8 1/2 in) standard gauge
- Operating speed: 120 km/h (74.6 mph) (max)

Ilsenburg–Vienenburg railway (new section)

Overview
- Line number: 6393
- Locale: Saxony-Anhalt and Lower Saxony, Germany

Technical
- Line length: 13.6 km (8.5 mi)

The present-day Heudeber-Danstedt–Vienenburg railway is a 32 kilometre long main line, that serves the northern edge of the Harz Mountains in central Germany. Its main role is the handling of tourist traffic in the Harz and the Harz Narrow Gauge Railways there, but it is also worked by goods trains to and from the rolling mills in Ilsenburg.

The line originally ran from Ilsenburg further south towards Bad Harzburg. This section was cut, however, by the division of Germany in 1945. In 1996 a new section of line was built from Ilsenburg towards Vienenburg, that used parts of the previously closed Halberstadt–Vienenburg railway. At the same time the railway was upgraded to handle speeds of up to 120 km/h. The line has since acted as a direct link between Halberstadt and Vienenburg.

== History ==
=== To 1945 ===
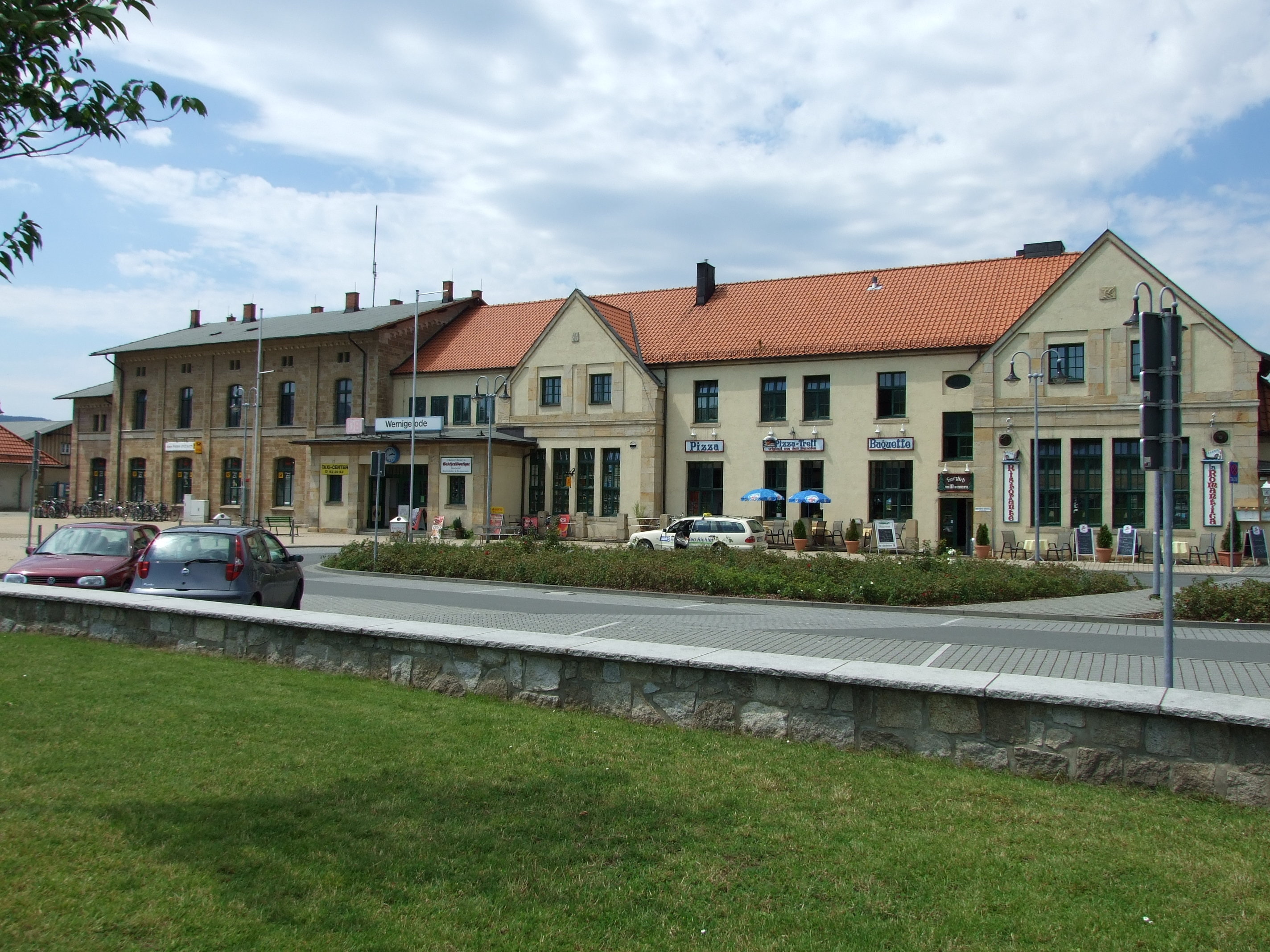
Wernigerode station

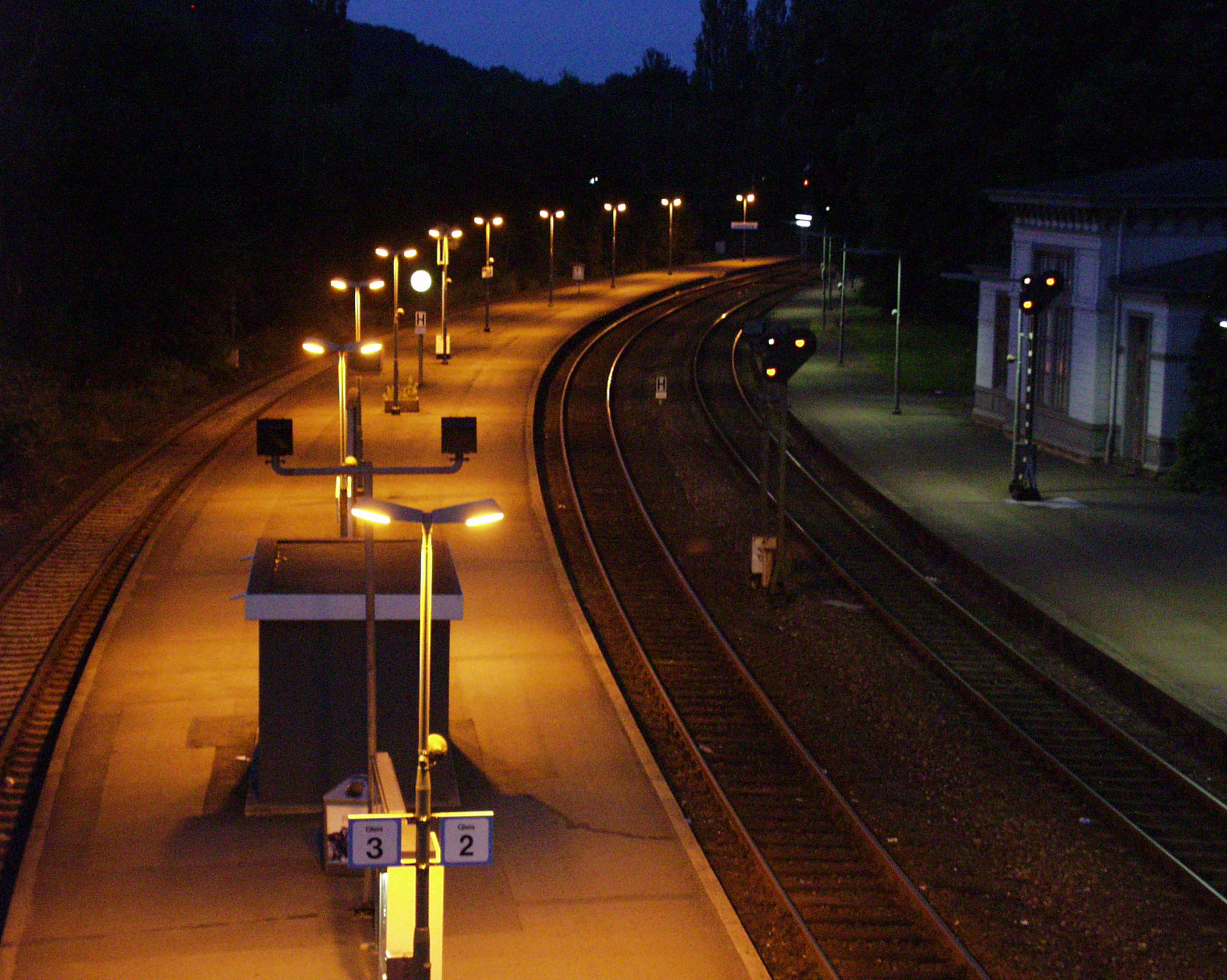
Vienenburg station

There had been a direct link between Halberstadt, Heudeber-Danstedt and Vienenburg since 1869. This took the shortest distance, but missed out the densely populated Harz Foreland and towns like Wernigerode and Ilsenburg. The spa town of Wernigerode, already important, was able to persuade Berlin, that the Magdeburg-Halberstadt Railway Company was obliged to deliver a roughly nine kilometre long branch line from Heudeber-Danstedt. This was opened on 11 May 1872.

This was following by growing demands from Ilsenburg with its burgeoning iron and steel industry. There were long negotiations about a rail link from Wernigerode via Ilsenburg to Bad Harzburg with a possible extension to Goslar, which was not considered commercially viable according to estimates at that time. In the end, the Prussian state railways had the line built and, on 20 May 1884, Ilsenburg and Wernigerode were linked to one another. As the line was only of regional importance a winding route was accepted. Questionmarks over the planned route and the resistance of landowners further delayed the construction of the section to Bad Harzburg. It was not until 1 October 1894 that services called here, going via Stapelburg and Eckertal. From the outset there were through passenger trains from Bad Harzburg to Halberstadt.

Even if this link mainly served the local region, there was a number of long-distance trains, including in the 1930s by going through coaches from Hamburg via Wernigerode to Berlin.

=== Division in 1945 ===
Although the line had suffered no heavy damage during the war, upon the division of Germany in 1945 it was cut on the border between the zones of occupation between Stapelburg and Eckertal. The Deutsche Bundesbahn discontinued passenger services to Eckertal in 1958.

In 1961 the Deutsche Reichsbahn cut public services back from Stapelburg, which was in the border area, to Ilsenburg. The line did remain open as a military branch however.

=== Reconnexion in 1996 ===
In December 1989 in the euphoria after the fall of the Berlin Wall the section from Ilsenburg to Stapelburg was reopened. In the years that followed there was and intensive debate about reconnecting lines between Lower Saxony and Saxony-Anhalt in the North Harz region. It was soon clear that the federal government and the railway authorities only wanted to fund one link at the time. The old goods line was however unsuitable for regional services, the inclines near and Bad Harzburg and the change of running direction there were major drawbacks for goods traffic. As a result, it was decided to create a new route that started in front of Stapelburg on the line from Ilsenburg and rejoined the line to Vienenburg in Saxony-Anhalt. That also meant that the construction work in Lower Saxony could be viewed by the planning authorities as the renovation of an existing line which enabled the installation of level crossings On 12 April 1995 the Ilsenburg–Stapelburg line was closed again and, on 2 June 1996, the new link was taken into service. Stapelburg was given a railway connexion for the third time with a new halt.

The line was initially worked by Interregio trains, but they soon disappeared again.

In 2007 the line was closed for trackworks; it was given new electronic signal boxes and was equipped for the trains using tilting technology. In December 2007 it was open again from end to end. As part of the upgrade almost all the old signal boxes were torn down, including the one that was a protected monument at Ströbeck station. The conservation authorities filed charges and the Deutsche Bahn were not able to reach a resolution with them.

== 2010 operations ==
The current operating concept envisages fast passenger trains running between Halle and Hanover (the HarzExpress) and local trains operated by (HEX) stopping at all stations, both at two-hourly intervals. The line is part of the North Harz Network (Nordharznetz). At weekends the Harz Berlin Express links the Harz with Berlin. Since the 2008 timetable change journey times have reduced as a result of the completion of construction work.

In addition steel is moved between the factories in Salzgitter and Ilsenburg.

== Sources ==
- Dirk Endisch (2009), Die Strecke Halberstadt–Vienenburg (in German), Stendal: Verlag Dirk Endisch, ISBN 978-3-936893-36-6
- Wolfgang Fiegenbaum; Wolfgang Klee (2002), Rückkehr zur Schiene. Reaktivierte and neue linen im Personenverkehr 1980–2001 (in German), Stuttgart: transpress, ISBN 3-613-71185-0
- Josef Högemann (1995), Eisenbahnen im Harz (I). Band 1: Die Staatsbahnstrecken (in German), Nordhorn: Verlag Kenning, ISBN 3-927587-43-5
