= Ecker =

River in Germany

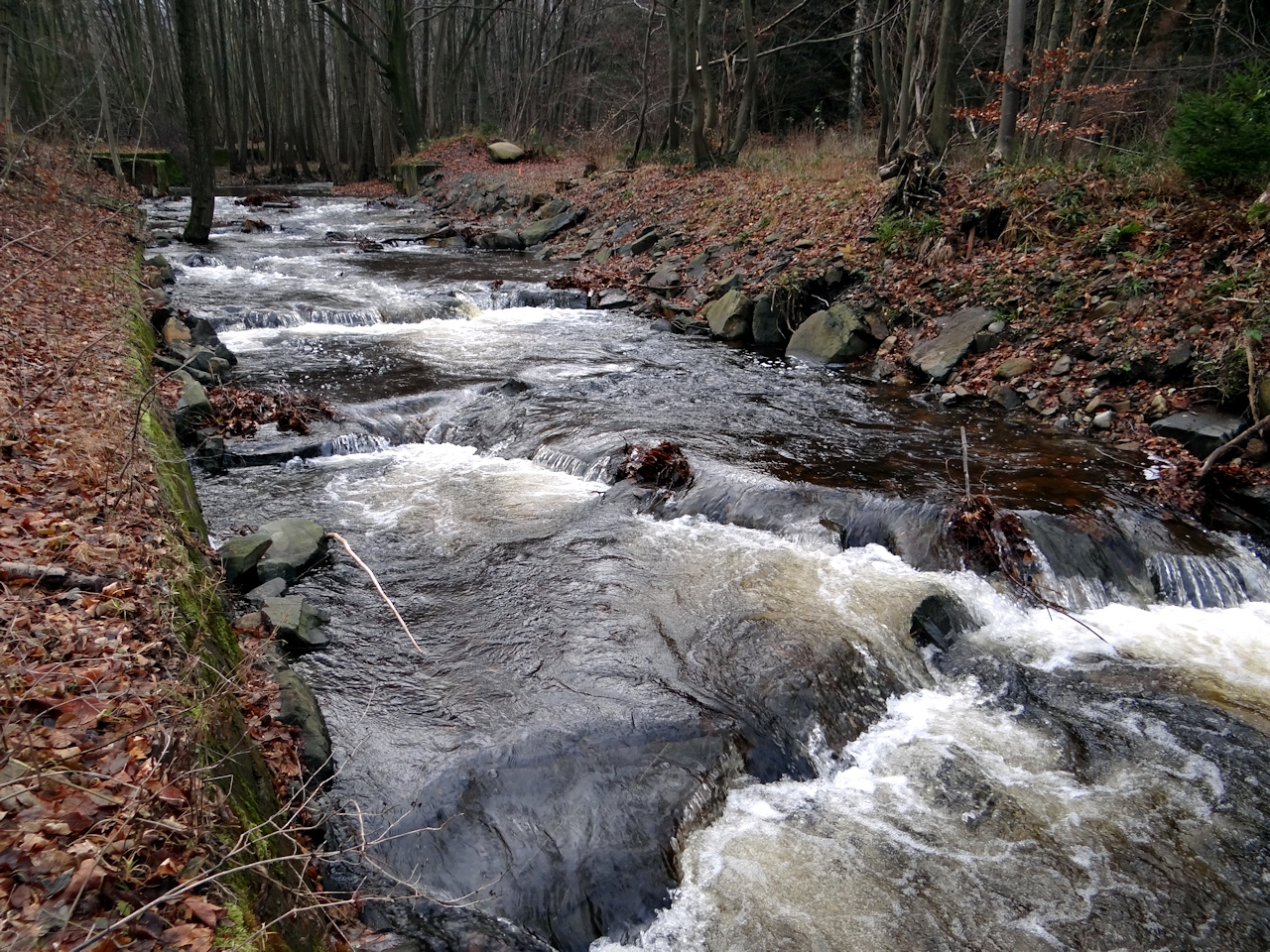

Location
- Country: Germany
- States: Saxony-Anhalt and Lower Saxony

Physical characteristics
- Source
  - location: Eckersprung: Southwest of the Brocken in the Harz
  - coordinates: 51°N 10°E
  - elevation: 893 m above sea level (NN)
- Mouth
  - location: North of Wiedelah into the Oker
  - coordinates: 51°N 10°E
  - elevation: 124 m above sea level (NN)
- Length: 28.0 km (17.4 mi)
- Basin size: 76.1 km^{2} (29.4 sq mi)

Basin features
- Progression: Oker→ Aller→ Weser→ North Sea
- Landmarks: Small towns: Vienenburg; Villages: Nordharz
- Tributaries
  - left: Abbe, Fuhler Lohnbach, Blaubach, Schamlahbach
  - right: Morgenbrodsbach, Großer Giersbach
- Waterbodies: Reservoirs: Ecker Reservoir

The Ecker is a 28-kilometre (17 mi), right-hand, southeast tributary of the Oker which runs mainly through the Harz mountains in the German states of Saxony-Anhalt and Lower Saxony.

== Course ==
From its source to Abbenrode the Ecker is a border river, today running between the federal states of Saxony-Anhalt and Lower Saxony. Prior to German reunification this was also the border between the German Democratic Republic in the east and Federal Republic of Germany to the west.

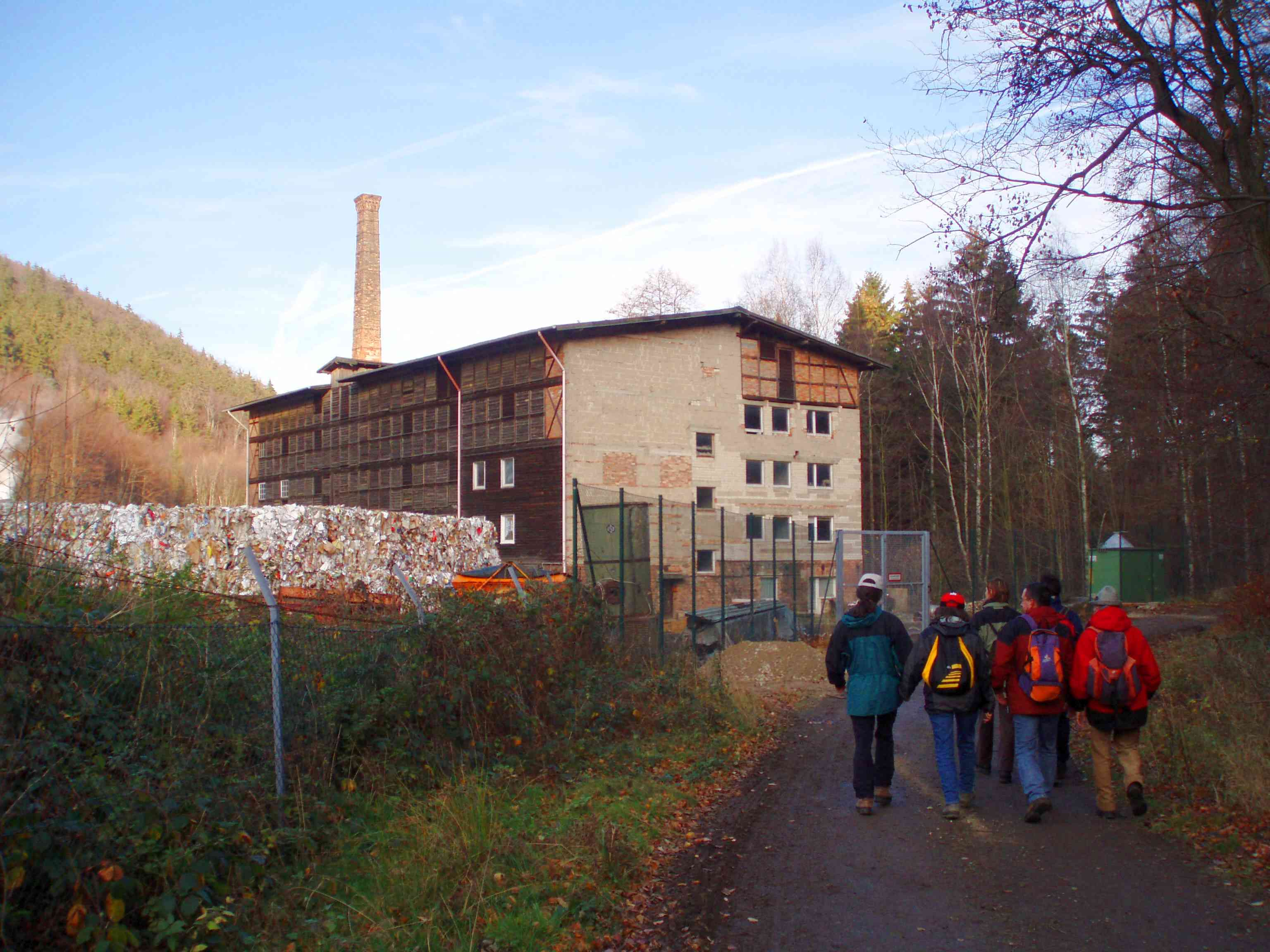
Cardboard factory in the upper Ecker valley

The Ecker rises around 2.5 kilometres (1.6 mi) southwest of the Brocken at 890 m above sea level (NN) at the Eckersprung. Until the border was reopened it was the end of the Goethe Way (Goetheweg) from Torfhaus. Today there is a large picnic area with toilets at the Eckersprung.

Along a steep, rocky bed, the Ecker initially flows to the Ecker Dam, then through the deeply incised Ecker valley towards the north-northeast, where it passes the Ahlsburg, and then leaves the Harz. The upper Ecker valley is part of the Harz National Park. Only the site of the paper factory, located there since the 19th century, was excluded.

Next, the Ecker runs via Stapelburg to Abbenrode (a Nordharz district) before emptying later into the Oker, a tributary of the Aller, just north of Wiedelah (a Vienenburg district) on the A 395 motorway at about 120 m above NN. Before Wiedelah some of the water is diverted as the Ecker Ditch (Eckergraben) and only feeds back into the Oker 10 kilometres (6 mi) north of Schladen.

== See also ==
- List of rivers of Lower Saxony
- List of rivers of Saxony-Anhalt
