= Vienenburg–Langelsheim railway =

Railway line in Germany

Overview
- Line number: 1934 (Vienenburg–Grauhof); 1935 (Grauhof–Langelsheim)
- Locale: Lower Saxony, Germany

Technical
- Line length: 17.9 km (11.1 mi)
- Track gauge: 1,435 mm (4 ft 8 1/2 in) standard gauge

The Vienenburg–Langelsheim railway was a nearly 18-kilometer-long railway along the northern edge of the Harz in the German state of Lower Saxony. It was mainly used for freight traffic. It was opened in 1875, but it lost its importance with the closure of a line connecting to the east as a result of the division of Germany after the Second World War and it is now closed and dismantled.

== History ==
The Magdeburg–Halberstadt Railway Company (German: Magdeburg-Halberstädter Eisenbahngesellschaft, MHE) had been trying to develop a western connection from its network since the 1850s, but had failed as a result of disputes between the Kingdom of Prussia, the Kingdom of Hanover and the Duchy of Brunswick. In 1864, a treaty was finally contracted between Prussia and Brunswick authorising construction of the Halberstadt–Vienenburg railway, which was completed in 1869. With the annexation of Hanover by Prussia in 1866, it was possible to extend the line further to the west. Around the same time the Hanover-Altenbeken Railway Company (Hannover-Altenbekener Eisenbahn-Gesellschaft, HAE) was looking for a connection to the east and the mountain towns in the Upper Harz also wanted a connection to the rail network. So the HAE planned a new long-distance line on the Vienenburg–Hildesheim–Hamelin–Löhne route. The MHE line would build a connection from Vienenburg via Langelsheim to Clausthal. However, in 1873, the HAE ran into financial difficulties, so it was taken over by the MHE. This brought together the two projects aiming at building railways to Vienenburg and instead a line was built to Grauhof, splitting there to run towards Clausthal (the former Innerste Valley Railway) and towards Hildesheim (now part of the Hildesheim–Goslar railway). The latter connected in Ringelheim with the Brunswick Southern Railway, which ran to Kreiensen to meet the Altenbeken–Kreiensen railway, and to the line between Hanover and Kassel, which connected to western and southern Germany.

Freight was carried from Löhne to Vienenburg on 19 May 1875 and a passenger service followed on 30 June. The branch from Grauhof via Langelsheim to Lautenthal was open for freight from 25 October and for passengers from 15 November 1875.

On 15 September 1877, the line from Langelsheim to Neuekrug-Hahausen was opened, connecting with the Brunswick Southern Railway, which avoided having to go via Ringelsheim to reach Kreiensen. It has since been operated as part of the main line between Vienenburg and Langelsheim.

Goslar was at this time connected to the railway network only by the Vienenburg–Goslar railway. To improve this situation, two railway lines were built simultaneously into the city from Grauhof and Langelsheim, which were opened on 1 May 1883. Passenger services ran on the route via Goslar, with the ever-increasing freight traffic remaining on the older and less steep line.

A medium-sized marshalling yard (now closed) was built in Vienenburg, which was associated with a smaller facility in Grauhof.

In 1930, part of a potash mine in Vienenburg voll Wasser collapsed, causing a slump in the ground under the line and requiring repairs to the track, which lasted half a year.

With the division of Germany in 1945, this line lost its connection to the east. Now the line via Goslar could handle all traffic and Deutsche Bundesbahn ended services on the Vienenburg–Langelsheim line. Conflicting sources indicate traffic ended between 1949 and 1960. A section near Grauhof still operated as an industrial siding until the end of the 1990s, when it was finally disconnected.

Today the line is dismantled, but embankments and a bridge can still be found. The Hildesheim–Goslar railway still performs a tight turn at the former railway junction in Grauhof.

== sources ==
- Josef Högemann (1995). Eisenbahnen im Harz (I) (in German). Vol. 1: Die Staatsbahnstrecken. Nordhorn: Verlag Kenning. pp. 12f., 22ff. ISBN 3-927587-43-5.
