= Nordharz =

- Municipality
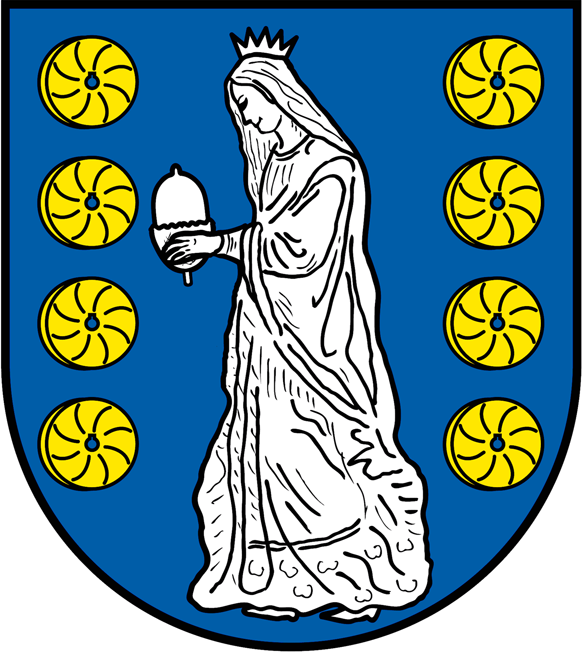
- Coat of arms

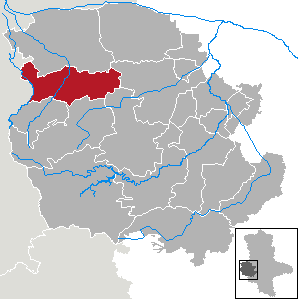
- Location of Nordharz within Harz district
- Interactive map of Nordharz
- Location within Germany Location within Saxony-Anhalt
- Coordinates: 51°54′N 10°46′E
- Country: Germany
- State: Saxony-Anhalt
- District: Harz

Government
  - Mayor (2024–31): Gerald Fröhlich (Ind.)

Area
  - Total: 110.66 km^{2} (42.73 sq mi)
- Elevation: 170 m (560 ft)

Population (2025-12-31)
  - Total: 7,550
  - Density: 68.2/km^{2} (177/sq mi)
- Time zone: UTC+01:00 (CET)
  - Summer (DST): UTC+02:00 (CEST)
- Postal codes: 38855, 38871
- Dialling codes: 039451, 039452, 039458
- Vehicle registration: HZ
- Website: gemeinde-nordharz.de

Nordharz (German pronunciation: [ˈnɔʁtˌhaːɐ̯ts], literally "North Harz") is a municipality in the district of Harz, in Saxony-Anhalt, Germany.

The municipal area consists of eight Ortschaften or municipal divisions:

- Abbenrode
- Danstedt
- Heudeber
- Langeln
- Schmatzfeld
- Stapelburg
- Veckenstedt
- Wasserleben

The administrative seat is located in Veckenstedt. The municipality was formed in the course of an administrative reform on 1 January 2010 by merging seven municipalities of the former Verwaltungsgemeinschaft ("collective municipality") Nordharz with the municipality of Danstedt, formerly part of the Verwaltungsgemeinschaft Harzvorland-Huy.
