= Ahlsburg (castle) =

- Alerdestein
- Stapelburg

Site information
- Type: Hilltop castle
- Code: DE-ST
- Condition: Ruined walls

Location
- Coordinates: 51.8675°N 10.62083°E
- Height: 483 m above sea level (NN)

Site history
- Built: First mentioned in 1357

The Ahlsburg or Alerdestein was an Imperial castle near Stapelburg in the present-day Harz district, in the German state of Saxony-Anhalt.

== Location ==
The site of the former Ahlsburg is located about 4.5 km (2.8 mi) south-southwest of Stapelburg and 4 km (2.5 mi) north-northeast of the Ecker Dam, on the northern edge of the Harz mountain range. It is situated on the eastern bank of the Ecker River, a south-eastern tributary of the Oker that forms the state border with Lower Saxony to the west. The castle stood above a narrow section of the valley, where a footbridge crossed the Ecker, on a spur with steep granite crags.

== History ==
A Saxon noble Alardus of Burgdorf is mentioned as a witness, when in 1218 Emperor Otto IV made his will at nearby Harzburg Castle. Alardus' ancestors had been vested with estates around the former Werla Kaiserpfalz in the 12th century and probably erected the castle where the Ecker River formed the border of the County of Wernigerode with the Principality of Brunswick-Wolfenbüttel.

Ahlsburg Castle itself was first mentioned as Alerdestein in a 1357 deed of donation, when Emperor Charles IV enfeoffed Alard the Elder and Alard the Younger of Burgdorf with 1 ½ hides at the village of Wollingerode (near Ilsenburg) that "belong to the Alerdestein". Like the Werla Kaiserpfalz, it then still was an immediate allod of the emperor, and the lords of the castle were responsible for protecting the game law in the surrounding Imperial forest.

In the early modern period, the castle fell into ruin. With the County of Wernigerode, ownership passed to the Counts of Stolberg (Stolberg-Wernigerode from 1645). After World War II, the Inner German Border passed through the birch pioneer forest. On a right-hand bend in the former Kolonnenweg, there is a signpost to, amongst other places, "Ahlsburg", which runs uphill from the Ecker for about 100 m (330 ft). Today, only a few vestiges of the Ahlsburg remain.

== Sources ==
- Eduard Jacobs: Wüstungskunde des Kreises Grafschaft Wernigerode, Berlin 1921.
