= Schmatzfeld =

- Ortsteil of Nordharz
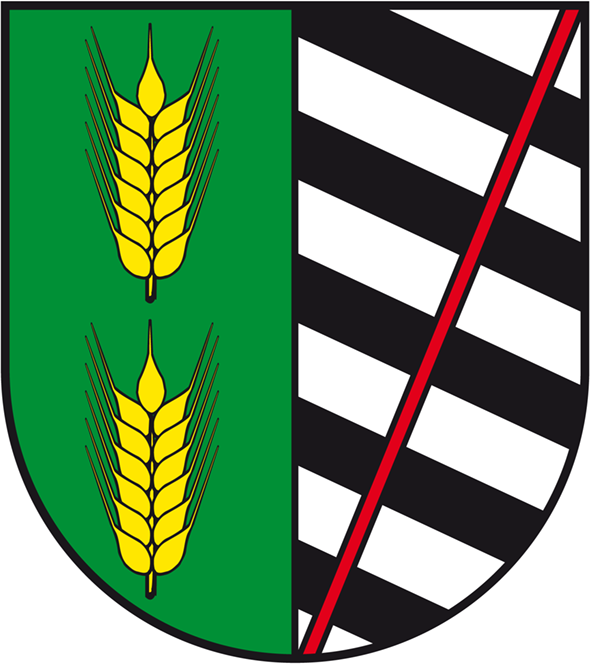
- Coat of arms
- Interactive map of Schmatzfeld
- Location within Germany Location within Saxony-Anhalt
- Coordinates: 51°53′N 10°45′E
- Country: Germany
- State: Saxony-Anhalt
- District: Harz
- Municipality: Nordharz

Area
  - Total: 6.22 km^{2} (2.40 sq mi)
- Elevation: 214 m (702 ft)

Population (2006-12-31)
  - Total: 355
  - Density: 57.1/km^{2} (148/sq mi)
- Time zone: UTC+01:00 (CET)
  - Summer (DST): UTC+02:00 (CEST)
- Postal codes: 38855
- Dialling codes: 039451
- Vehicle registration: HZ

Schmatzfeld is a village and a former municipality in the district of Harz, in Saxony-Anhalt, Germany.

Since 1 January 2010, it is part of the municipality Nordharz.
