= Veckenstedt =

- Ortsteil of Nordharz
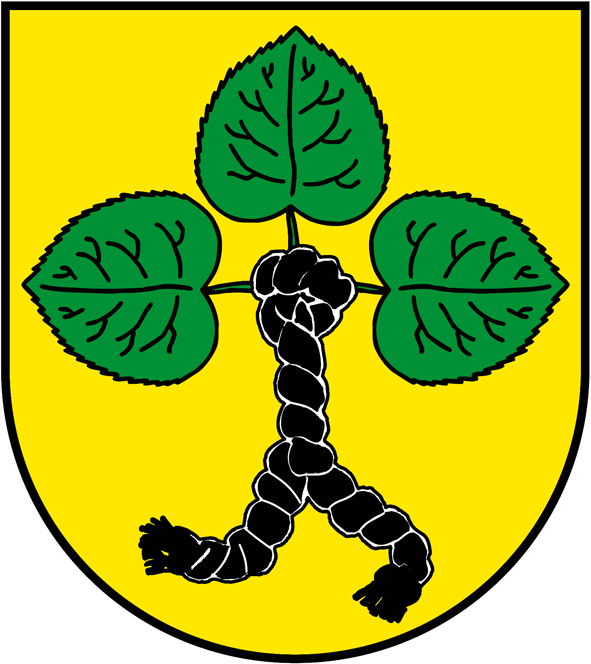
- Coat of arms
- Interactive map of Veckenstedt
- Location within Germany Location within Saxony-Anhalt
- Coordinates: 51°54′N 10°43′E
- Country: Germany
- State: Saxony-Anhalt
- District: Harz
- Municipality: Nordharz

Area
  - Total: 14.73 km^{2} (5.69 sq mi)
- Elevation: 170 m (560 ft)

Population (2006-12-31)
  - Total: 1,475
  - Density: 100.1/km^{2} (259.4/sq mi)
- Time zone: UTC+01:00 (CET)
  - Summer (DST): UTC+02:00 (CEST)
- Postal codes: 38871
- Dialling codes: 039451
- Vehicle registration: HZ

Veckenstedt is a village and a former municipality in the district of Harz, in Saxony-Anhalt, Germany.

Since 1 January 2010, it is part of the municipality Nordharz.
