= Langeln, Saxony-Anhalt =

Langeln
- Ortsteil of Nordharz
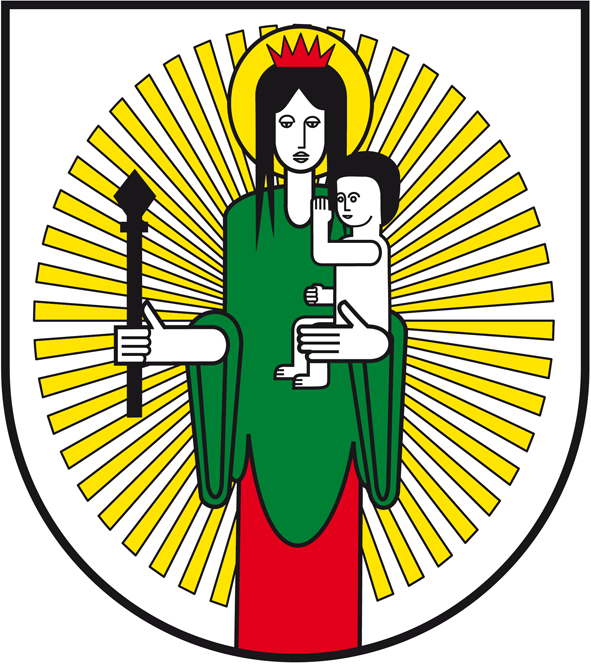
- Coat of arms
- Interactive map of Langeln
- Location within Germany Location within Saxony-Anhalt
- Coordinates: 51°54′N 10°47′E
- Country: Germany
- State: Saxony-Anhalt
- District: Harz
- Municipality: Nordharz

Area
  - Total: 14.23 km^{2} (5.49 sq mi)
- Elevation: 180 m (590 ft)

Population (2006-12-31)
  - Total: 1,110
  - Density: 78.0/km^{2} (202/sq mi)
- Time zone: UTC+01:00 (CET)
  - Summer (DST): UTC+02:00 (CEST)
- Postal codes: 38871
- Dialling codes: 039458
- Vehicle registration: HZ

Langeln (German pronunciation: [ˈlaŋl̩n]) is a village and a former municipality in the district of Harz, in Saxony-Anhalt, Germany.

Since 1 January 2010, it is part of the municipality Nordharz.
