= Danstedt =

- Ortsteil of Nordharz
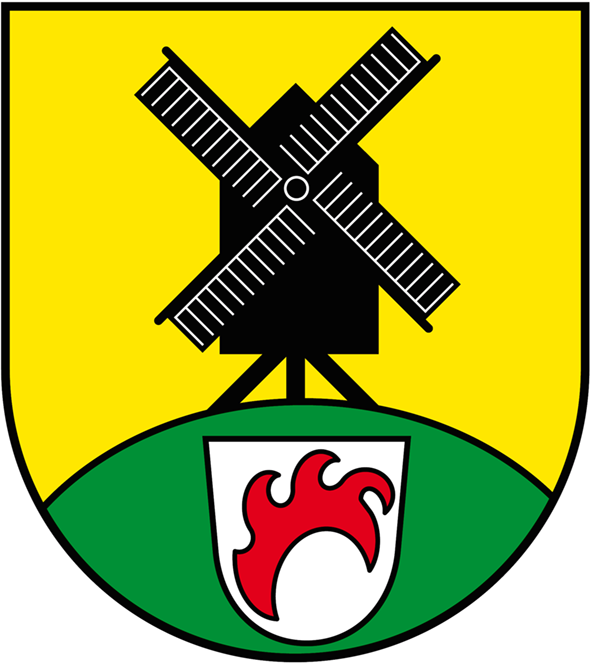
- Coat of arms
- Interactive map of Danstedt
- Location within Germany Location within Saxony-Anhalt
- Coordinates: 51°54′45″N 10°53′12″E
- Country: Germany
- State: Saxony-Anhalt
- District: Harz
- Municipality: Nordharz

Area
  - Total: 14.10 km^{2} (5.44 sq mi)
- Elevation: 160 m (520 ft)

Population (2006-12-31)
  - Total: 539
  - Density: 38.2/km^{2} (99.0/sq mi)
- Time zone: UTC+01:00 (CET)
  - Summer (DST): UTC+02:00 (CEST)
- Postal codes: 38855
- Dialling codes: 039458
- Vehicle registration: HZ
- Website: www.harzvorland-huy.de

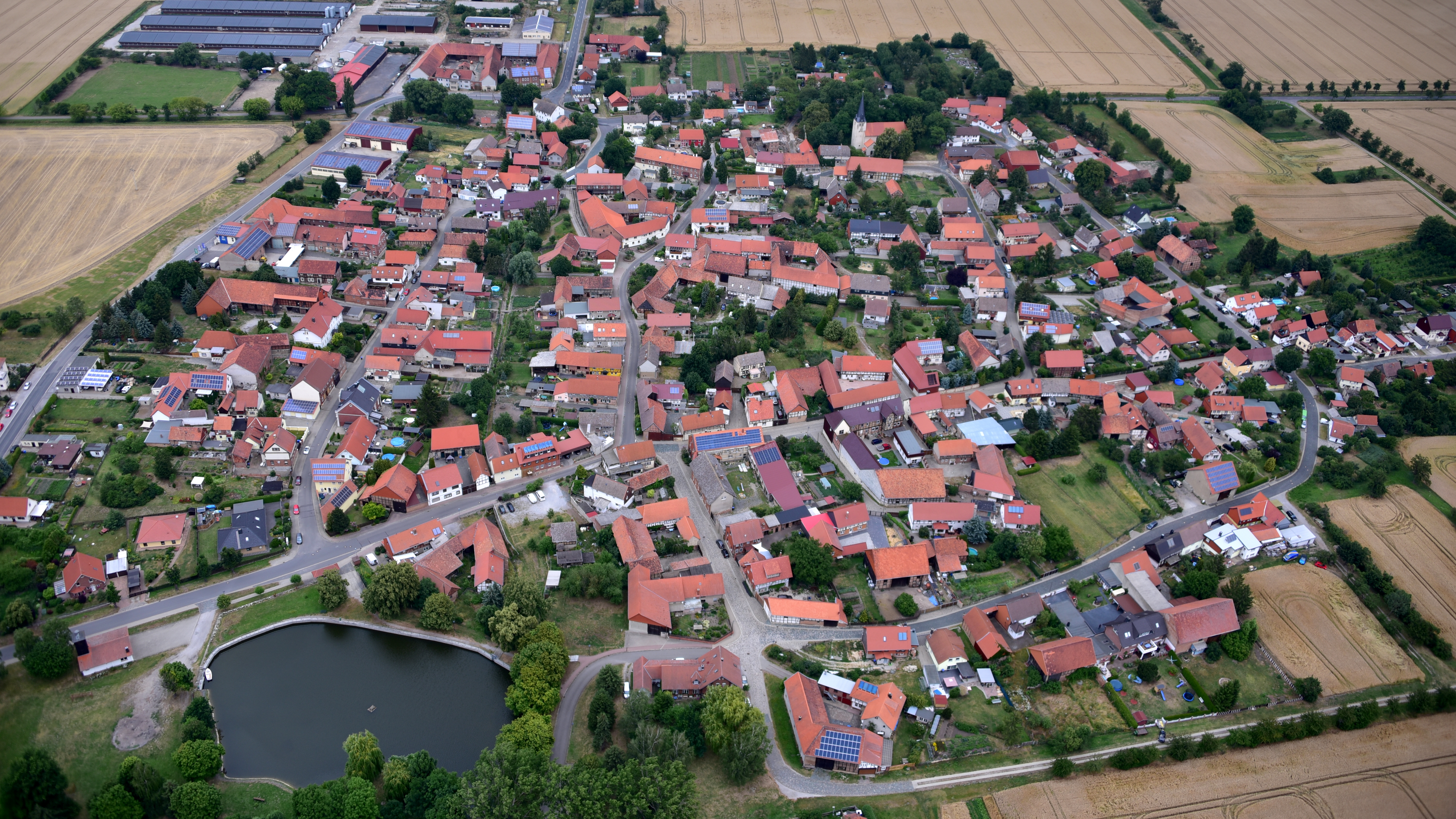

Danstedt is a village and a former municipality in the district of Harz, in Saxony-Anhalt, Germany. Since 1 January 2010, it is part of the municipality Nordharz.
