= Abbenrode =

- Ortsteil of Nordharz
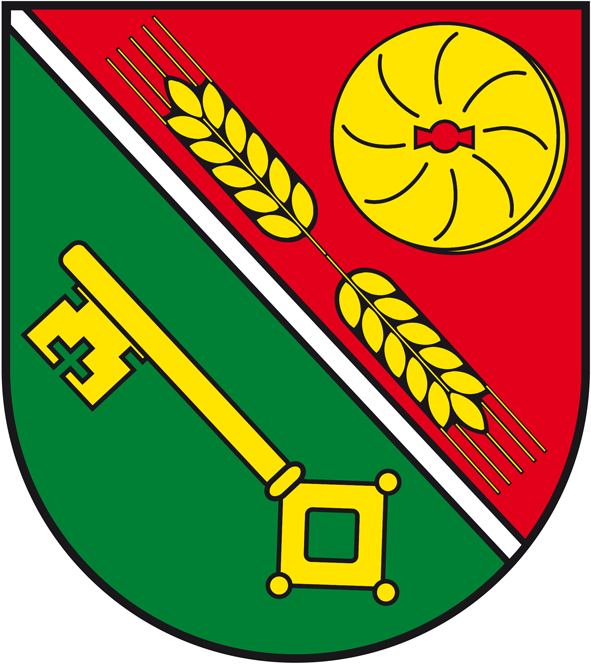
- Coat of arms
- Interactive map of Abbenrode
- Location within Germany Location within Saxony-Anhalt
- Coordinates: 51°55′39″N 10°37′41″E
- Country: Germany
- State: Saxony-Anhalt
- District: Harz
- Municipality: Nordharz

Area
  - Total: 11.18 km^{2} (4.32 sq mi)
- Elevation: 178 m (584 ft)

Population (2006-12-31)
  - Total: 946
  - Density: 84.6/km^{2} (219/sq mi)
- Time zone: UTC+01:00 (CET)
  - Summer (DST): UTC+02:00 (CEST)
- Postal codes: 38871
- Dialling codes: 039452
- Vehicle registration: HZ
- Website: gemeinde-nordharz.de

Abbenrode is a village and a former municipality in the district of Harz, in Saxony-Anhalt, Germany. Since 1 January 2010, it has been part of the municipality of Nordharz.

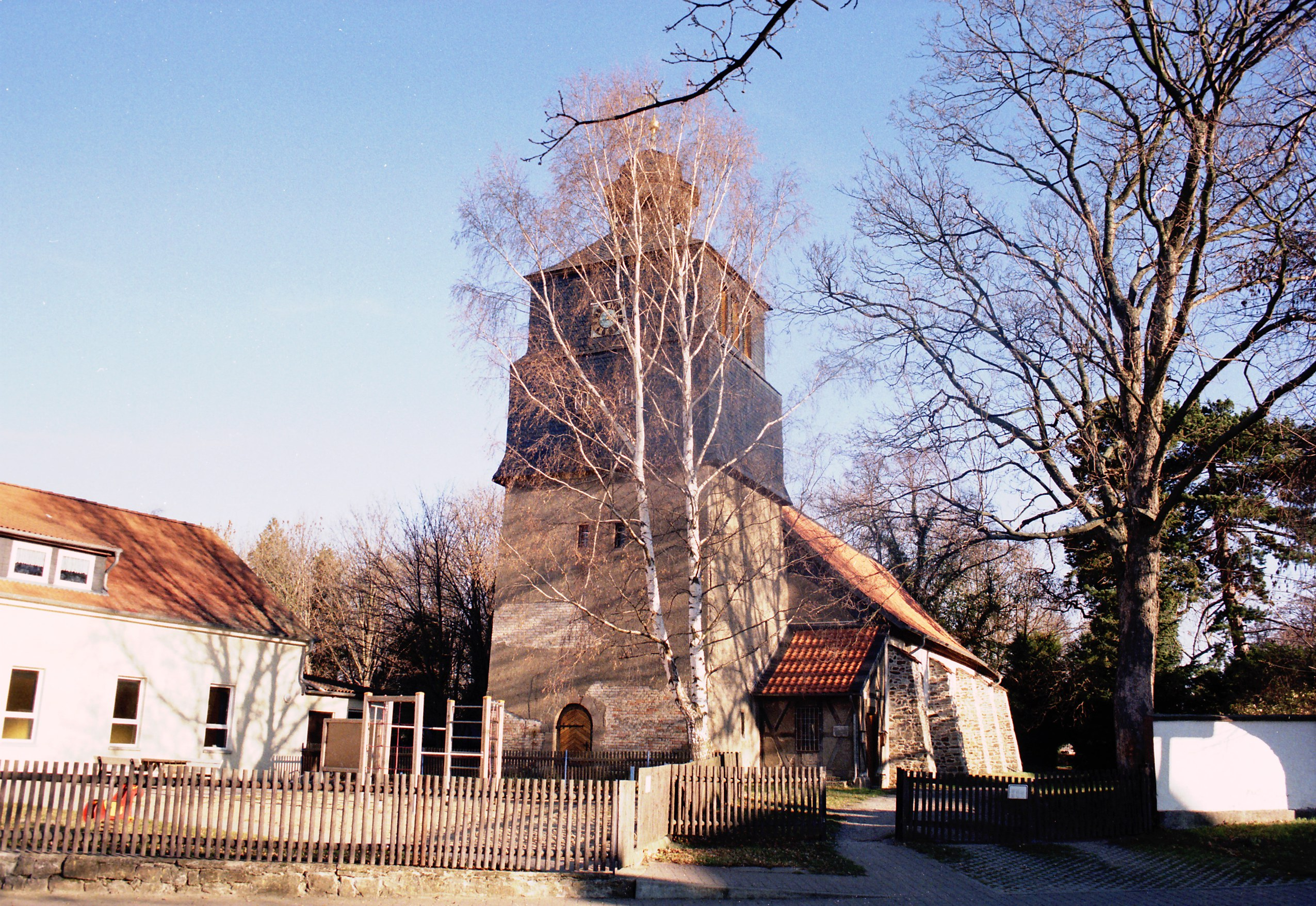
St Andrew's Church

The village is situated north of the Harz mountain range, near the Ecker creek and the border with the state of Lower Saxony.

The Abbenrode manor, possibly named after a first settler called Abbo, arose in the medieval Duchy of Saxony and was first mentioned as Abbenrot in an 1129 deed issued by King Lothair III of Germany. About 1145 Bishop Rudolf of Halberstadt established a monastery of Benedictine nuns here. His foundation received the confirmation by Pope Eugene III in 1148. The abbey was devastated during the 1525 German Peasants' War and finally dissolved under the rule of the Protestant Halberstadt administrator Sigismund of Brandenburg in 1554. The present-day parish church, dedicated to Saint Andrew, was consecrated in 1575.

After World War II the village became isolated and decayed owing to its location close to the inner-German border. Since German reunification Abbenrode has recovered.
