= Stapelburg =

- Ortsteil of Nordharz
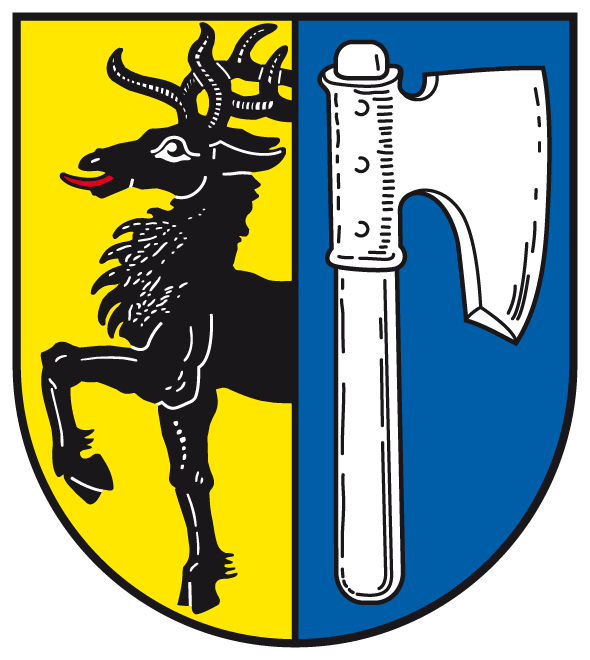
- Coat of arms
- Interactive map of Stapelburg
- Location within Germany Location within Saxony-Anhalt
- Coordinates: 51°54′4″N 10°39′49″E
- Country: Germany
- State: Saxony-Anhalt
- District: Harz
- Municipality: Nordharz

Area
  - Total: 11.74 km^{2} (4.53 sq mi)
- Elevation: 242 m (794 ft)

Population (2006-12-31)
  - Total: 1,391
  - Density: 118.5/km^{2} (306.9/sq mi)
- Time zone: UTC+01:00 (CET)
  - Summer (DST): UTC+02:00 (CEST)
- Postal codes: 38871
- Dialling codes: 039452
- Vehicle registration: HZ

Stapelburg is a village and a former municipality in the district of Harz, in Saxony-Anhalt, Germany.

Since 1 January 2010, it is part of the Nordharz municipality.

== Geography ==
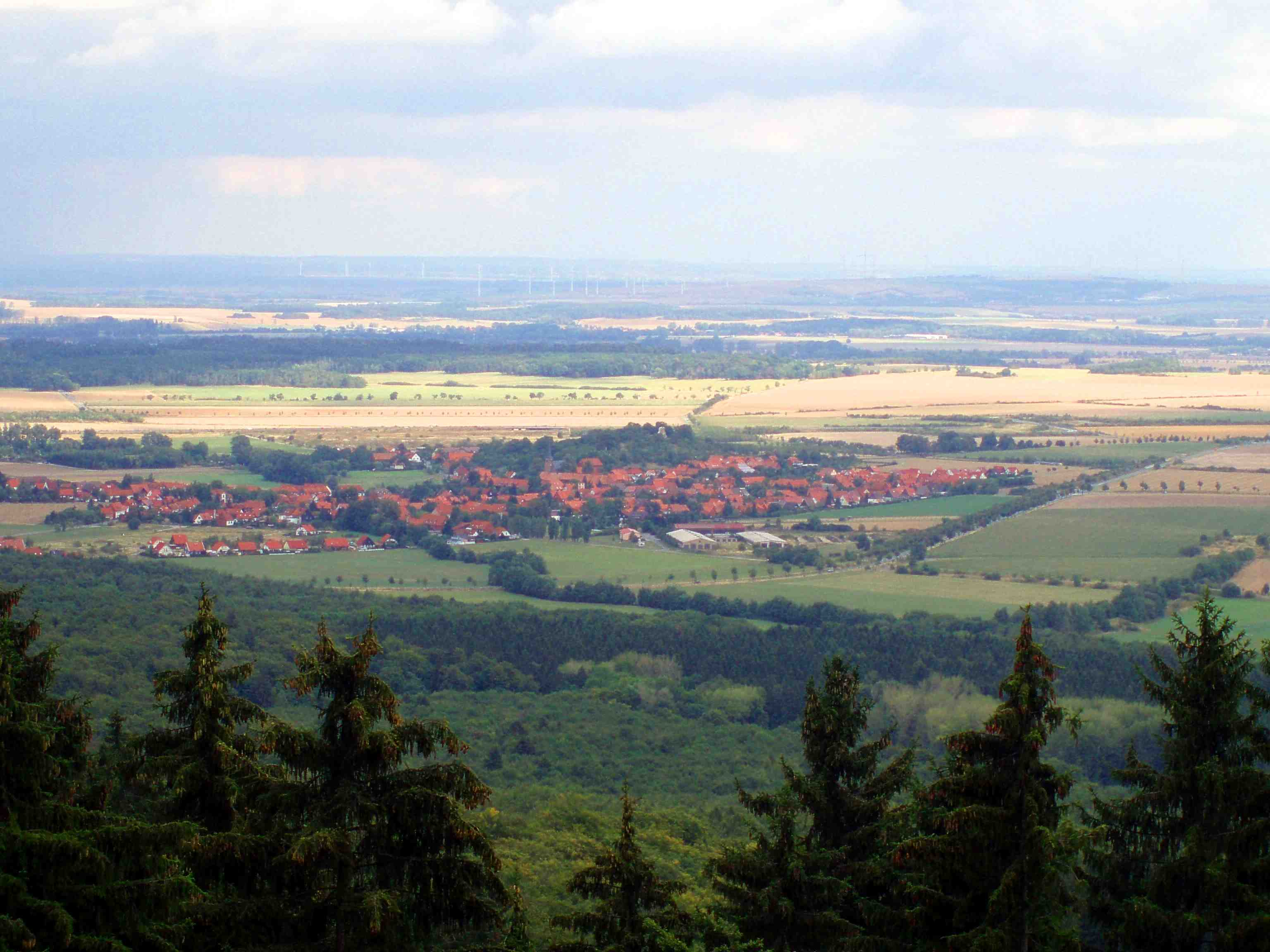
View from the Harz mountains

It is located at the northern foot of the Harz mountain range and Harz National Park, about 4 kilometres (2.5 mi) north of the town of Ilsenburg. The small Ecker river in the west, a tributary of the Oker, forms the border with the town of Bad Harzburg in Lower Saxony.

The settlement has access to the Bundesstraße 6 federal highway running from the Bundesautobahn 395 near Goslar to Halle and the Bundesautobahn 14. Stapelburg station is served by the Vienenburg-Halberstadt railway line.

== History ==
Stapelburg Castle was first mentioned in a 1306 deed as a property of the Counts of Wernigerode; it was meant to protect and control the trade route to the Imperial City of Goslar near the border with the Principality of Brunswick-Wolfenbüttel. Prior to that an Imperial castle, mentioned as Ahlsburg in the 14th century, was erected a few kilometres south-southwest in the Harz mountains on a spur high above the Ecker valley.

The Stapelburg estates passed to the Prince-Bishops of Halberstadt in 1394 and were temporarily given in pawn to the Counts of Stolberg. The settlement emerged in the second half of the 16th century from the outlying estate (Vorwerk) of Bilenshausen or Bilashausen, that had been established by the former Halberstadt councillor Heinrich von Bila (1535–1584) at the foot of medieval castle. After lengthy negotiations, castle and village were finally purchased by Count Christian Ernest of Stolberg-Wernigerode in 1722.

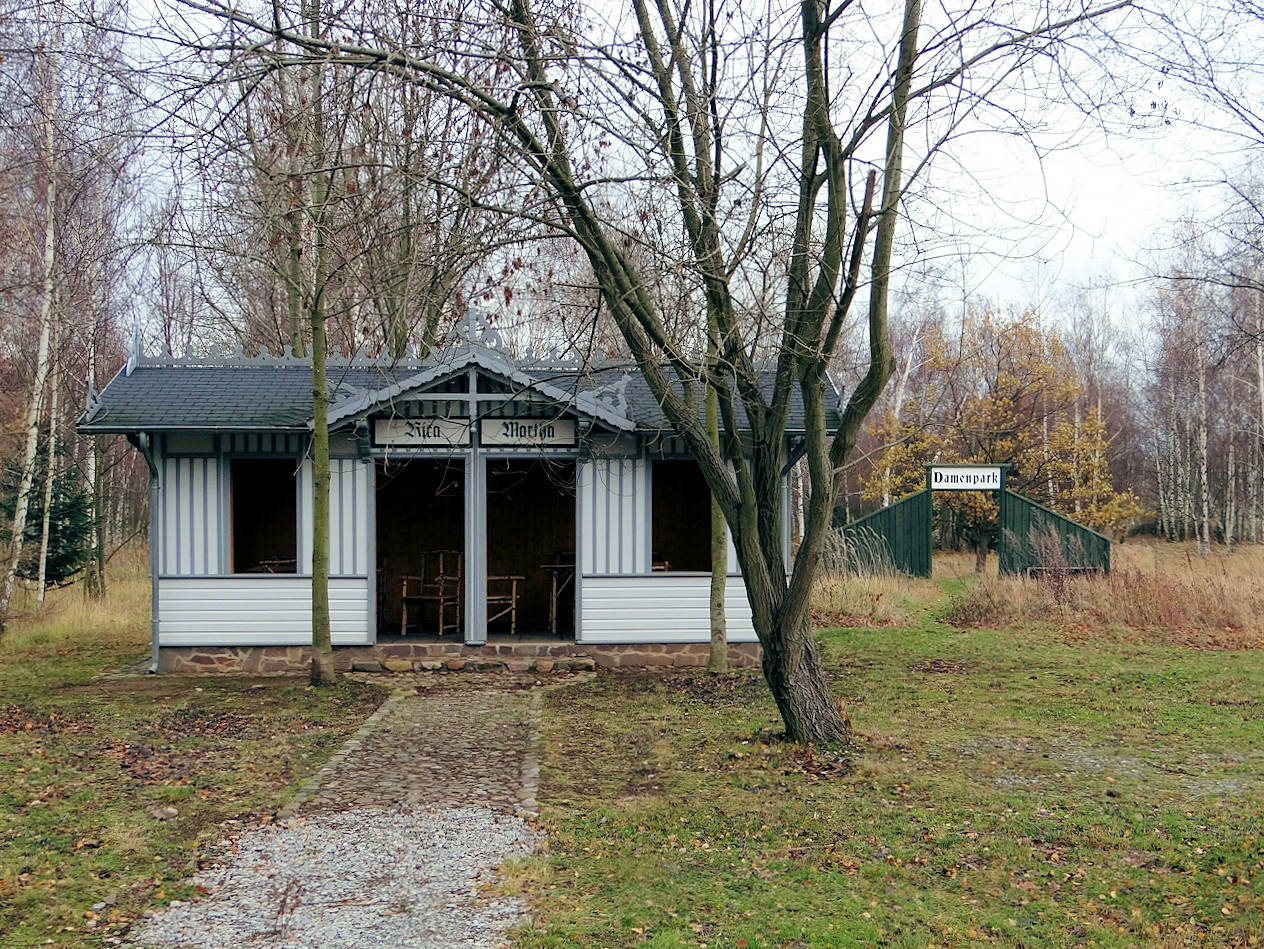
Reconstructed Jungborn pavillon

The meadows in the Ecker valley south of the village were the site of the Jungborn destination spa, founded in 1896 by Adolf Just, which hosted notable guests like Franz Kafka in July 1912. As the Ecker formed part of the inner German border after World War II, the facility was closed and finally demolished in 1964 to make space for border fortifications.

== Notable people ==
- Manfred Zapf (born 1946), footballer
- Bernhard Glass (born 1957), luger
