= Harzvorland-Huy =

Coordinates: 51°55′N 10°57′E

Harzvorland-Huy was a Verwaltungsgemeinschaft ("collective municipality") in the district of Harz, in Saxony-Anhalt, Germany. It was situated between Wernigerode and Halberstadt. The seat of the Verwaltungsgemeinschaft was in Ströbeck.

It was disbanded on 1 January 2010.

The Verwaltungsgemeinschaft Harzvorland-Huy consisted of the following municipalities:

1. Aspenstedt
2. Athenstedt
3. Danstedt
4. Langenstein
5. Sargstedt
6. Ströbeck
