= Hasserode Castle =

Coordinates: 51°49′15″N 10°44′42″E

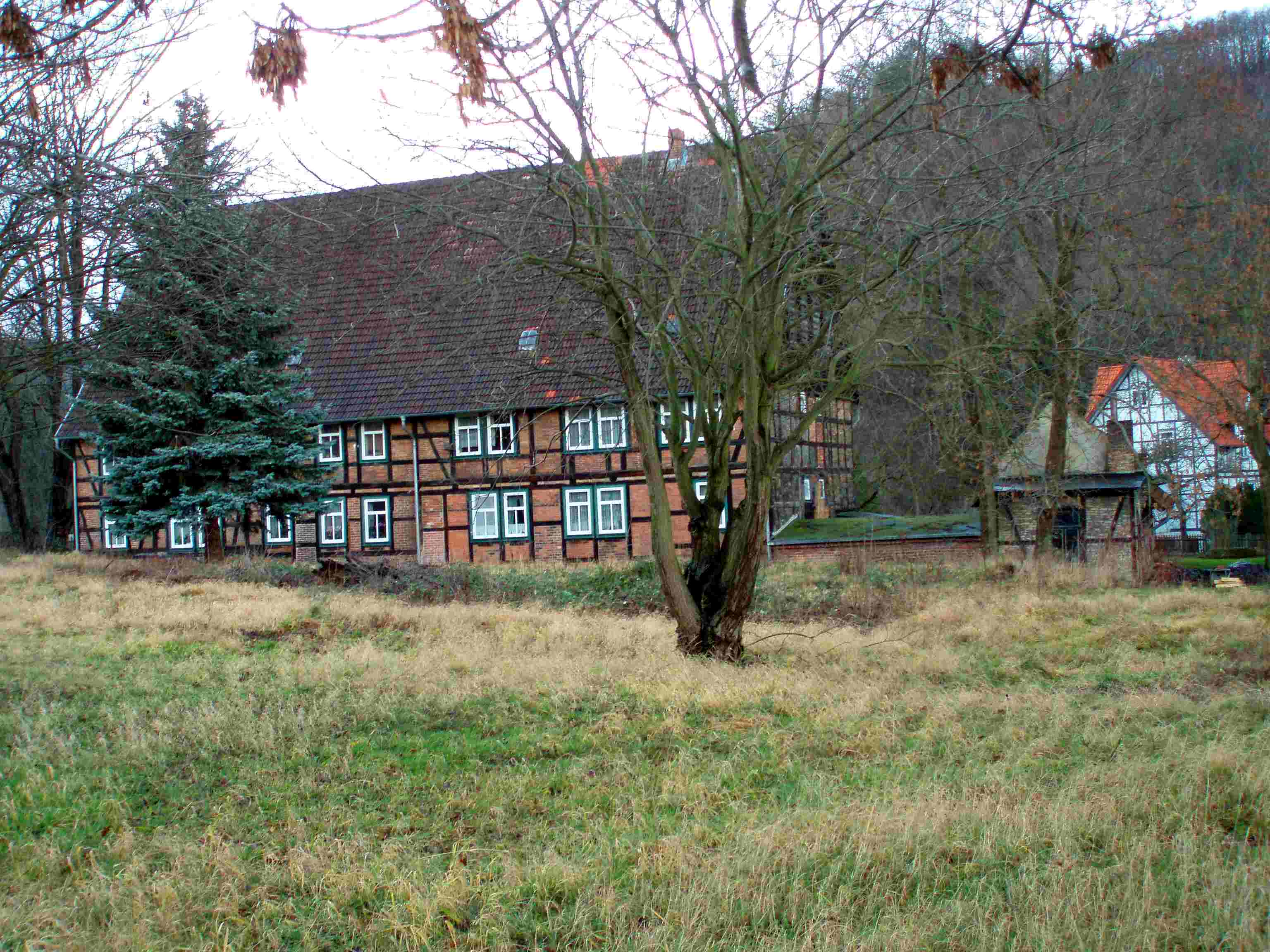
Site of Hasserode Castle

Hasserode Castle (German: Burg Hasserode) in the quarter of the same name in the town of Wernigerode am Harz was a medieval fortification whose site is near Hasserode station on the Harz Narrow Gauge Railways. Today there are no visible traces left of the castle.

== Early history ==
The archival documented history of the Harz forests around the once independent municipality of Hasserode, that has been part of the borough of Wernigerode since 1907, go well back into the Middle Ages. Originally, this wooded region belonged to an imperial forest before it was enfeoffed by the Holy Roman emperors and German kings to the counts of Wernigerode, first mentioned in 1121, who came from Haimar in the Diocese of Hildesheim.

The counts of Wernigerode, like most ruling dynasties, endeavoured to extend their sphere of influence. In the Harz Foreland at the foot of the mountain range called the Huy they had freehold estates in various villages. These villages were, however, under the counts of Regenstein. In a clever move, the Wernigerode counts attempted to bind the subjects of these villages closer to them by granting timber rights in their forests in the Harz to the local farmers. For example, in 1253, there is already mention of the Hadebergeberg (now known as the Heudeberberg) south of the Augustine hermitage of Himmelpforten Abbey, destroyed in 1525. The Regenstein village of Heudeber was granted timber rights in this forest. Other villages were given similar rights by the counts of Wernigerode no later than the mid-14th century in the woods right and left of the Holtemme and in the Dränge valley. As well as Heudeber, the villages of Reddeber, Danstedt, Ströbeck, Athenstedt, Aspenstedt, Sargstedt and Runstedt also benefited.

These parishes, mainly located on the Huy, had certain privileges within a specified area of forest area, for which the expression Achtwort was coined at the beginning of the 15th century. In the circumstance of medieval Germany, the use of this forest area for these village which were approximately 10 to 30 kilometres away from the Harz, was very difficult. In order to protect them and better organize the management of the forest, a base at the foot of Harz was required.

== Sources ==
- Jacobs, Eduard (1882). Urkundenbuch der Deutschordens-Commende Langeln ..., Halle
- Sommer, Gustav and Jacobs, Eduard (1883). Beschreibende Darstellung der älteren Bau- und Kunstdenkmäler der Grafschaft Wernigerode. Halle
- Brückner, Jörg (1998). Die Burg Hasserode: zur Geschichte eines Rittersitzes am Fuße des Harzes. In: Burgen und Schlösser in Sachsen-Anhalt, Vol. 7, p. 26–41.
- Brückner, Jörg (1998). Prügelei brachte ein Kurfürstentum hervor: Neues über die Burg Hasserode. In: Neue Wernigeröder Ztg., Jg. 9, 1998, 6, p. 20
