= Langenstein =

Langenstein may refer to:

- Langenstein, Austria, a municipality in Upper Austria, Austria
- Langenstein, Saxony-Anhalt, a municipality in Saxony-Anhalt, Germany
  - Langenstein-Zwieberge, a WW2 concentration camp in Langenstein, Saxony-Anhalt
