= Georg Hornstein =

Georg Hornstein

Georg Hornstein (8 December 1900 – 3 September 1942) was a German-Jewish Resistance fighter during the period of National Socialism (nazism). His acknowledgement of his Jewish heritage, which he made in 1942 during one of his periods of captivity by the Gestapo, has been frequently proclaimed and used as an example of Jewish resistance to the National Socialist regime.

== Life ==
Georg Hornstein was born in Berlin, the son of a shopkeeper and grew up in Düsseldorf, where his family moved in 1902. In Düsseldorf his parents operated a shop on the elegant Königsallee. Hornstein completed his Abitur and was enrolled briefly at the business school in Cologne, until he enlisted as a volunteer near the end of World War I in January 1918. He was first sent to Vienna and then served as an ensign in Kraków until his discharge in November 1918.

He then continued his studies in Cologne, Paris, London and Buenos Aires and returned to Düsseldorf in 1926. After the National Socialists seized power, Hornstein emigrated to Amsterdam and opened a leathergoods business. At the outbreak of the Spanish Civil War, he volunteered for the Spanish Army in Barcelona, belonging to the German Thälmann Battalion of the International Brigades. During the battle or siege of Madrid he was seriously wounded, nevertheless from September 1937 until April 1938 he served as communications officer in Albacete.

Then he returned to his business in Amsterdam. In May 1940, during World War II, as the National Socialists occupied the Netherlands, he was still able to liquidate his business and with the proceeds from the sale of his business to acquire jewelry and other valuables. However, he was not able to leave the Netherlands and flee abroad. Hornstein was captured by the security police ( Sicherheitsdienst or SD) and transferred to the prison in Düsseldorf, where he was first detained and then also tortured. During one of his periods of imprisonment by the Gestapo, Hornstein wrote the following declaration about his Jewish identity:

I possess German citizenship and according to the letter of the law I am considered a German citizen. However, as a Jew, I have, for all practical purposes, lost all rights in Germany, and was therefore forced to seek a new homeland … […] … As a Jew, I fought [in Spain] for my convictions and my rights. Under the present circumstances I no longer consider myself a German citizen and would use every opportunity that I might be given, to become a citizen of another country, where, as a Jew, I would be prepared, at any time, to fight for my rights. I have no further comments to make. Georg Hornstein, Interrogation report from the Gestapo, 24 January 1942.

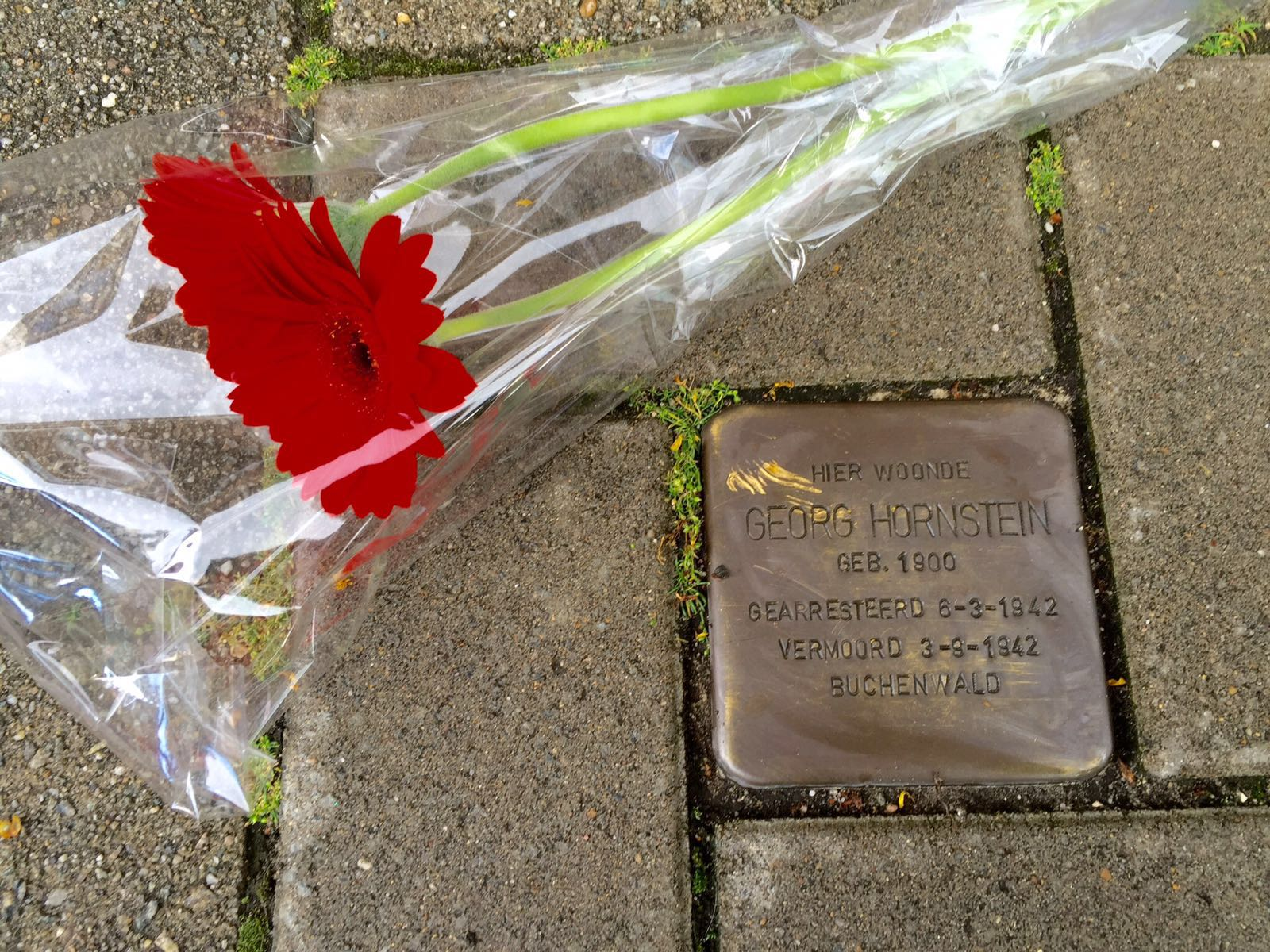
Georg Hornstein – Stolperstein at 65 Waalstraat, Amsterdam

Based on the interrogation report and evaluations of those in power, on 6 March 1942, Hornstein was taken into protective custody at level three (as “especially dangerous”) and transferred to the Buchenwald concentration camp, where he arrived on 7 May 1942. There he was under constant surveillance and was not allowed to work. In the meantime, his mother, Hulda Hornstein, was deported from Düsseldorf to Theresienstadt on 21 July 1942.

Georg Hornstein was murdered by members of the SS in Buchenwald on 3 September 1942.

== Literature ==
- Hans Erler, Arnold Paucker, Ernst Ludwig Ehrlich (Editors). "Gegen alle Vergeblichkeit: Jüdischer Widerstand gegen den Nationalsozialismus". Campus-Verlag, Frankfurt am Main, 2003, ISBN 3593373629, 311 pages.
- Arno Lustiger. "Zum Kampf auf Leben und Tod. Das Buch vom Widerstand der Juden 1933–1945". Kiepenheurer & Witsch, Cologne, 1994.ISBN 346202292X pp. 73–75.
- Konrad Kwiet, Helmut Eschwege. "Selbstbehauptung und Widerstand. Deutsche Juden im Kampf um Existenz und Menschenwürde 1933–1945". 2d edition. Hans Christians Verlag, Hamburg, 1986. (Hamburger Beiträge zur Sozial- und Zeitgeschichte, Bd. 19) ISBN 3767208504, pp. 107–108.
