= Lustiger =

Lustiger is a surname. Notable people with the surname include:

- Arno Lustiger (1924–2012), German historian and author of Jewish origin
- Gila Lustiger (born 1963), German author
- Jean-Marie Lustiger (1926–2007), French cardinal of the Roman Catholic Church
