= Nina Willner =

American nonfiction author, former intelligence officer and human rights activist

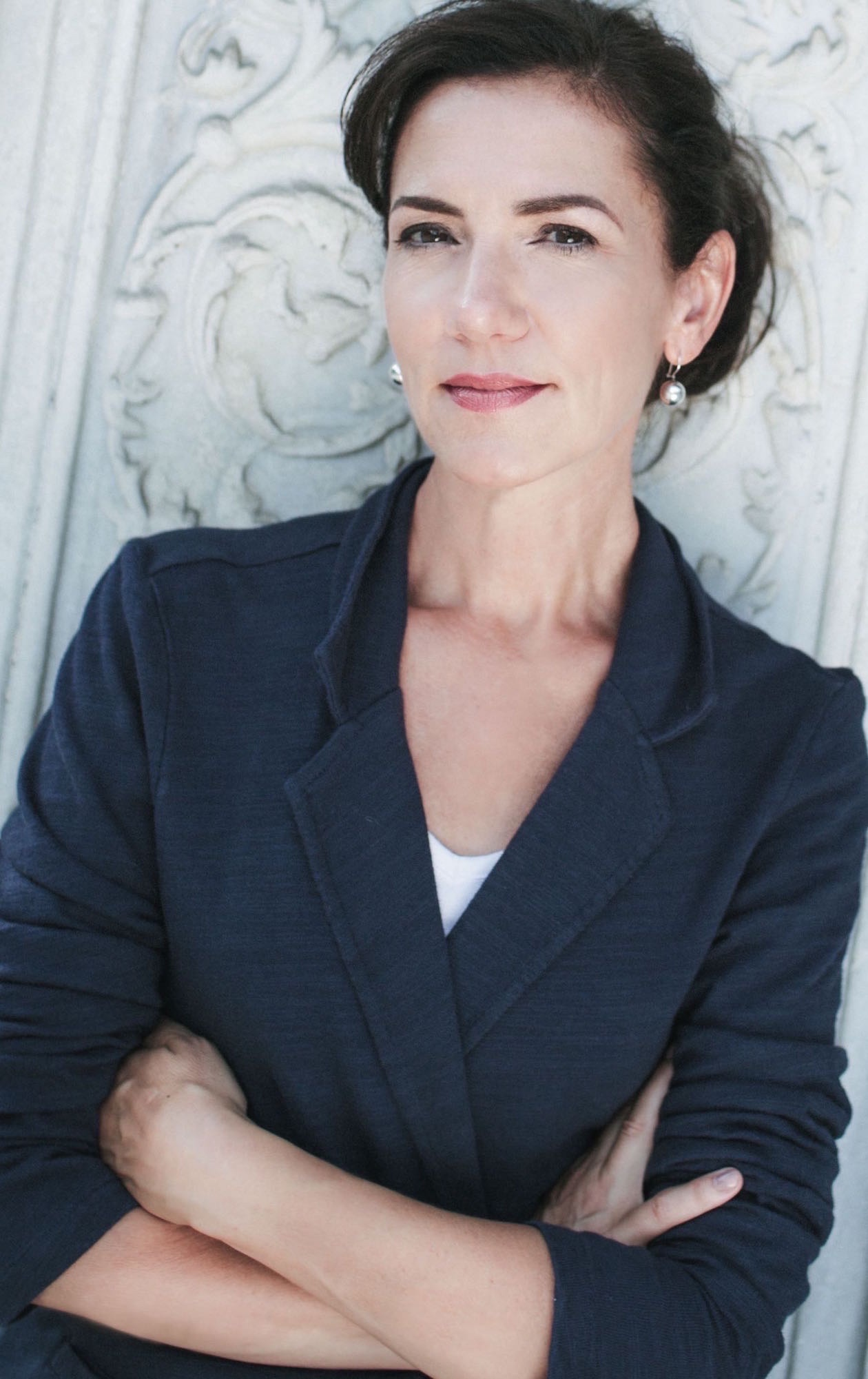
- Born: 1961 (age 64–65)
- Occupations: Nonfiction author; former intelligence officer
- Website: https://www.ninawillner.com

Nina Willner is an American nonfiction author, a former intelligence officer and human rights activist. Her first book Forty Autumns: A Family's Story of Courage and Survival on Both Sides of the Berlin Wall (HarperCollins William Morrow, 2016, ISBN 0062410318) is the story of Willner's mother's escape from communist East Germany at age 20, the large family she left behind the Iron Curtain, and their four-decade journey to reunite. During the Cold War, Willner led reconnaissance missions in Soviet-controlled East Berlin. Willner uses her personal story to tell the broader story of the Cold War and the fall of communism in Eastern Europe.

Forty Autumns was named as one of the Top 15 Nonfiction Books of 2016 by The Christian Science Monitor, and Publishers Weekly praised it as a "thrilling and relevant read for historians and casual readers". Library Journal gave it a starred review and called it "gripping".

Willner's next book The Boys in the Light: An Extraordinary WWII Story of Survival, Faith and Brotherhood was published in July 2025 by Penguin Random House (Dutton), and is non-fiction about her father, Eddie Willner's, experience of The Holocaust as a boy and being rescued and adopted by a company of young American tankers of the 3rd Armored Division.
