= Arno Lustiger =

German historian and author of Jewish origin (1924–2012)

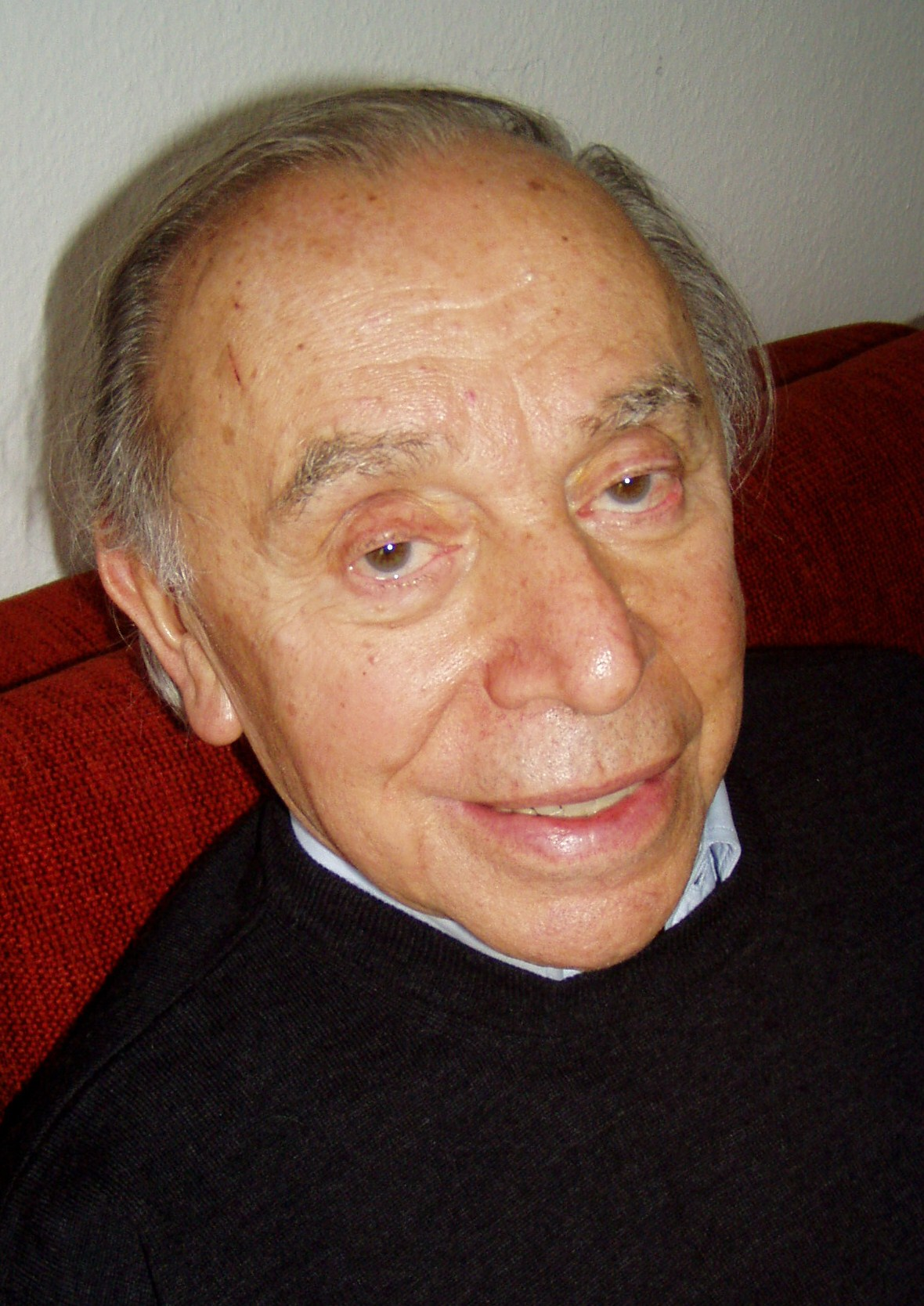
Arno Lustiger.

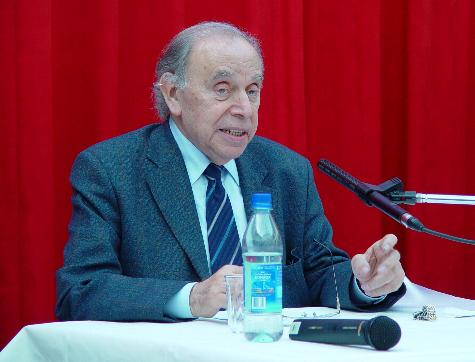
Arno Lustiger.

Arno Lustiger (May 7, 1924 – May 15, 2012) was a German historian and author of Jewish origin. Lustiger made significant contributions to research and document the history of Jewish resistance under Nazi rule.

He was the father of the author Gila Lustiger and cousin to Jean-Marie Lustiger, archbishop of Paris.

== Life ==
Lustiger was born and grew up in Będzin in the Polish portion of Upper Silesia. His father, David Lustiger, City Councillor of Będzin, had a company making machines for bread production. In 1939 the company was confiscated by the Nazis, but David Lustiger stayed in the company as a worker. In the beginning of 1943 the Jewish population of Będzin was detained in the Będzin Ghetto. The Lustiger family were able to hide in a cellar. In August 1943, the ghetto was closed and the population was deported to the concentration camp Auschwitz-Birkenau. A few days later, the family voluntarily went to a camp of forced workers in Annaberg, Silesia, in order to remain together as a family.

However, the family was torn apart. Lustiger was deported to the concentration camp Ottmuth and later to Blechhammer, a subcamp of Auschwitz. Starting from January 21, 1945 Lustiger had to join the death march during the freezing winter towards the Gross-Rosen concentration camp in Lower Silesia, as the Soviet troops were approaching. Only half of the 4.000 inmates survived the death march. Later he was deported to Buchenwald concentration camp and to the Langenstein-Zwieberge concentration camp near Halberstadt. There the expectancy of life was around three or four weeks.

In April 1945 Lustiger escaped during another death march, when the concentration camp was closed due to the approaching American troops. He was rescued by American soldiers and became a uniformed and armed translator of the US Army.

Since the end of the Second World War Lustiger had lived in Frankfurt and had built up a successful company for ladies' fashion. He had written articles about German-Jewish history, the Spanish Civil War, the Jewish resistance and the persecution of Jews by Joseph Stalin. From 2004 to 2006 he was visiting professor at the Fritz-Bauer-Institute in Frankfurt.

On January 27, 2005, Arno Lustiger held a speech in front of the German Bundestag together with Wolf Biermann. On September 10, 2006, his essay (printed in the Frankfurter Allgemeine Sonntagszeitung) criticised Günter Grass's treatment of his Waffen-SS membership in his latest book.

On May 15, 2012, Lustiger died in Frankfurt am Main, Germany. He was 88.

== Awards ==
- 1984 – Bundesverdienstkreuz (Order of Merit of the Federal Republic of Germany)
- 1994 – Bundesverdienstkreuz Ist class
- 1999 – Moses Mendelssohn award
- 1999 – Goethe Plaque of the City of Frankfurt
- 2000 – International Brücke award of Görlitz
- 2001 – Heinz-Galinski-prize (shared with Wolf Biermann)
- 2003 – Honorary doctorate of University of Potsdam
- 2007 – Professor of Hessen
- 2009 – Großes Bundesverdienstkreuz (Grand Order of Merit of the Federal Republic of Germany)
