= Eddie Willner =

Holocaust survivor (1926–2008)

Eddie Hellmuth Willner
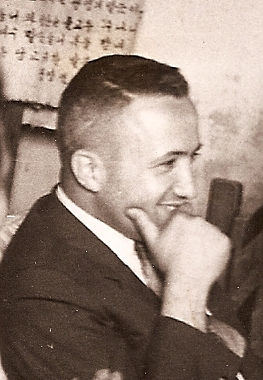
- Born: August 15, 1926
- Died: March 30, 2008 (aged 81)
- Burial place: Arlington National Cemetery
- Military career
- Allegiance: United States
- Branch: United States Army
- Rank: Major

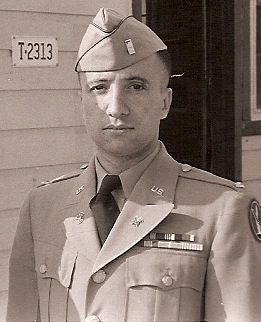
LT Willner

Eddie Hellmuth Willner (August 15, 1926 – March 30, 2008) was a German Jew, a US Army major, and a survivor of the Auschwitz and Buchenwald concentration camps whose World War II experiences are the subject of the 2025 book The Boys in the Light.

== Early life, slave laborer at sub-camps of Auschwitz ==
Willner, his mother and his father, a veteran of the German Army from World War I and recipient of the Iron Cross, fled Germany in 1939 due to the worsening situation for the Jews. They went initially to Belgium and then to France. Following the German occupation of France, they were arrested and transported from Drancy internment camp near Paris to Auschwitz. Willner's mother was immediately sent to the gas chambers. The SS made the male Willners slave laborers at subcamps of Auschwitz. At one of those camps, Blechhammer, Willner’s father became ill and was sent to Auschwitz and murdered. The SS put the prisoners, including Willner, on a death march to Gross-Rosen concentration camp, where he was then transported by train to Buchenwald and then on to one of Buchenwald's sub-camps, Langenstein-Zwieberge.

== Slave laborer at Langenstein-Zwieberge, sub-camp of Buchenwald ==
The work at Langenstein was excavation of rock in order to build tunnels to hide (from allied reconnaissance) production facilities for the Junkers factories that would build new types of aircraft and weapons. The work was extraordinarily harsh even by Nazi concentration camp standards. On average prisoners survived six weeks.

== Death march, escape ==
After surviving eight weeks, the SS put Willner and the other prisoners on another death march. At one point Willner and five other prisoners attempted to escape; Willner and one other prisoner, his close friend Maurits "Mike" Swaab, were successful despite gunfire from the guards, the fate of the others is unknown.

By following the sounds of artillery, Willner and Swaab found the U.S. Army 3rd Armored Division, 32nd Regiment, Company D. As the company advanced further eastward, the two survivors pointed out German positions which they had observed during their escape. The unit's medical personnel examined Willner and indicated he weighed 75 pounds. The soldiers of the division cared for the two survivors over several months and returned them to health. After the war Willner learned that 26 members of his family had been murdered by the Nazis.

== Life after the war ==
After the war, Willner immigrated to the United States and dedicated his life to service to the country that liberated him. He enlisted in the US Army and served for 21 years. Willner served in Europe, Korea and Japan, primarily as a criminal investigator and intelligence officer. He retired in 1969 as a major. Willner continued to serve his country as a US federal government employee at the Census Bureau for another 20 years and as a volunteer for 20 years on the Falls Church, Virginia, Law Enforcement Safety and Advisory Commission.

Eddie Willner married a German, Johanna, who had fled the Russian occupation of Germany. Johanna is the author of Christine: A Life in Germany after World War II, a novel based on the three years before her escape from East Germany. Eddie's story was told in the 2025 book titled, The Boys in the Light: An Extraordinary WWII Story of Survival, Faith and Brotherhood, by Nina Willner, (his daughter and author of Forty Autumns) which was published in July 2025 (Penguin Random House (Dutton)). Eddie and Johanna were married for 49 years until his death in 2008. They had six children.

== Gravesite ==
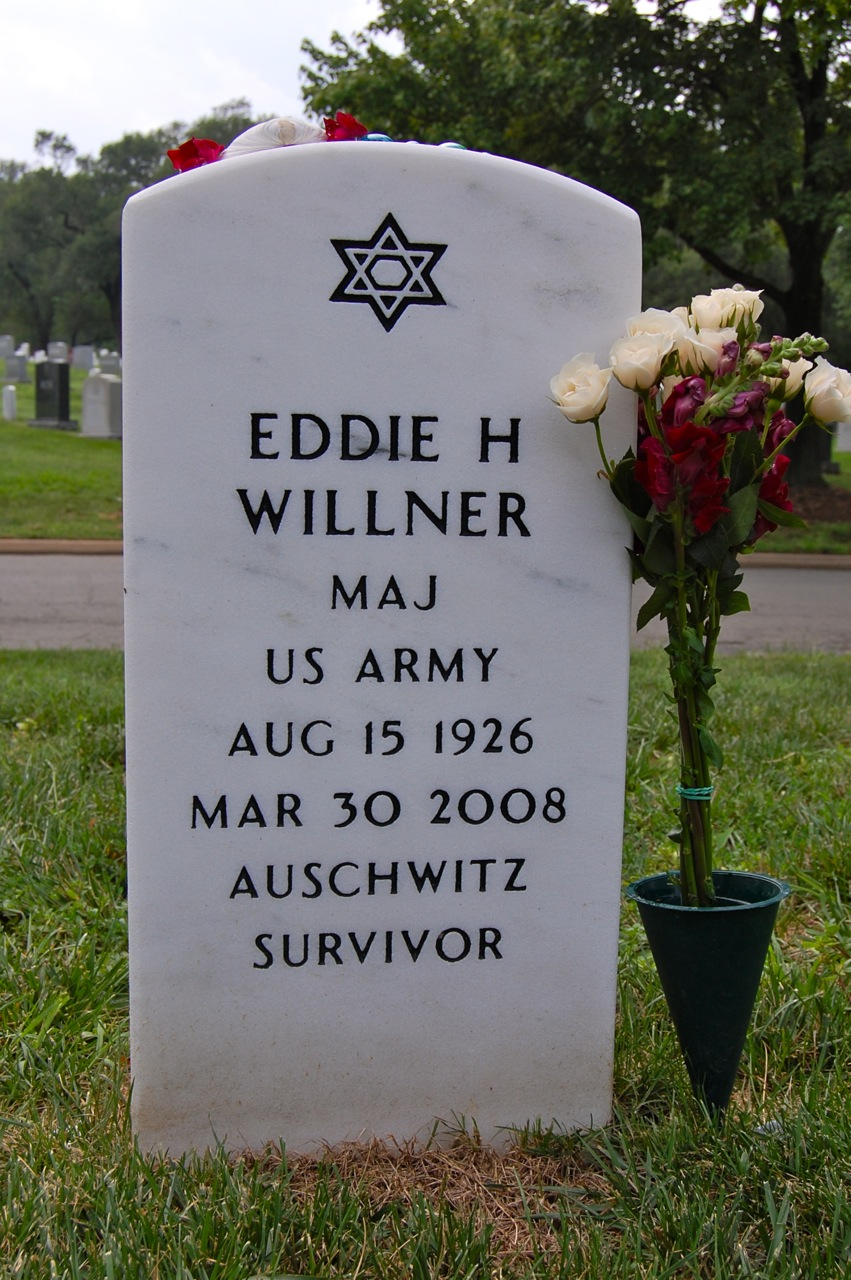
Eddie Willner's gravesite at Arlington National Cemetery.

Willner is buried in Arlington National Cemetery in Section 60, Grave 15.
