= Langenstein, Saxony-Anhalt =

Langenstein
- Stadtteil of Halberstadt
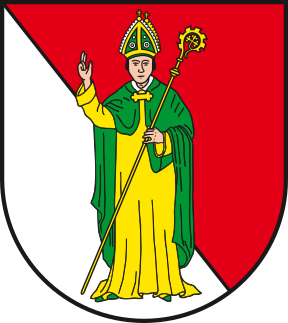
- Coat of arms
- Interactive map of Langenstein
- Location within Germany Location within Saxony-Anhalt
- Coordinates: 51°51′11″N 10°59′18″E
- Country: Germany
- State: Saxony-Anhalt
- District: Harz
- Town: Halberstadt

Area
  - Total: 21.28 km^{2} (8.22 sq mi)
- Elevation: 192 m (630 ft)

Population (2006-12-31)
  - Total: 1,929
  - Density: 90.65/km^{2} (234.8/sq mi)
- Time zone: UTC+01:00 (CET)
  - Summer (DST): UTC+02:00 (CEST)
- Postal codes: 38895
- Dialling codes: 03941
- Vehicle registration: HZ
- Website: www.gemeinde-langenstein-vorharz.de

Langenstein is a village and a former municipality in the district of Harz, in Saxony-Anhalt, Germany.

Since 1 January 2010, it is part of the town Halberstadt. The World War II concentration camp Langenstein-Zwieberge was located here.

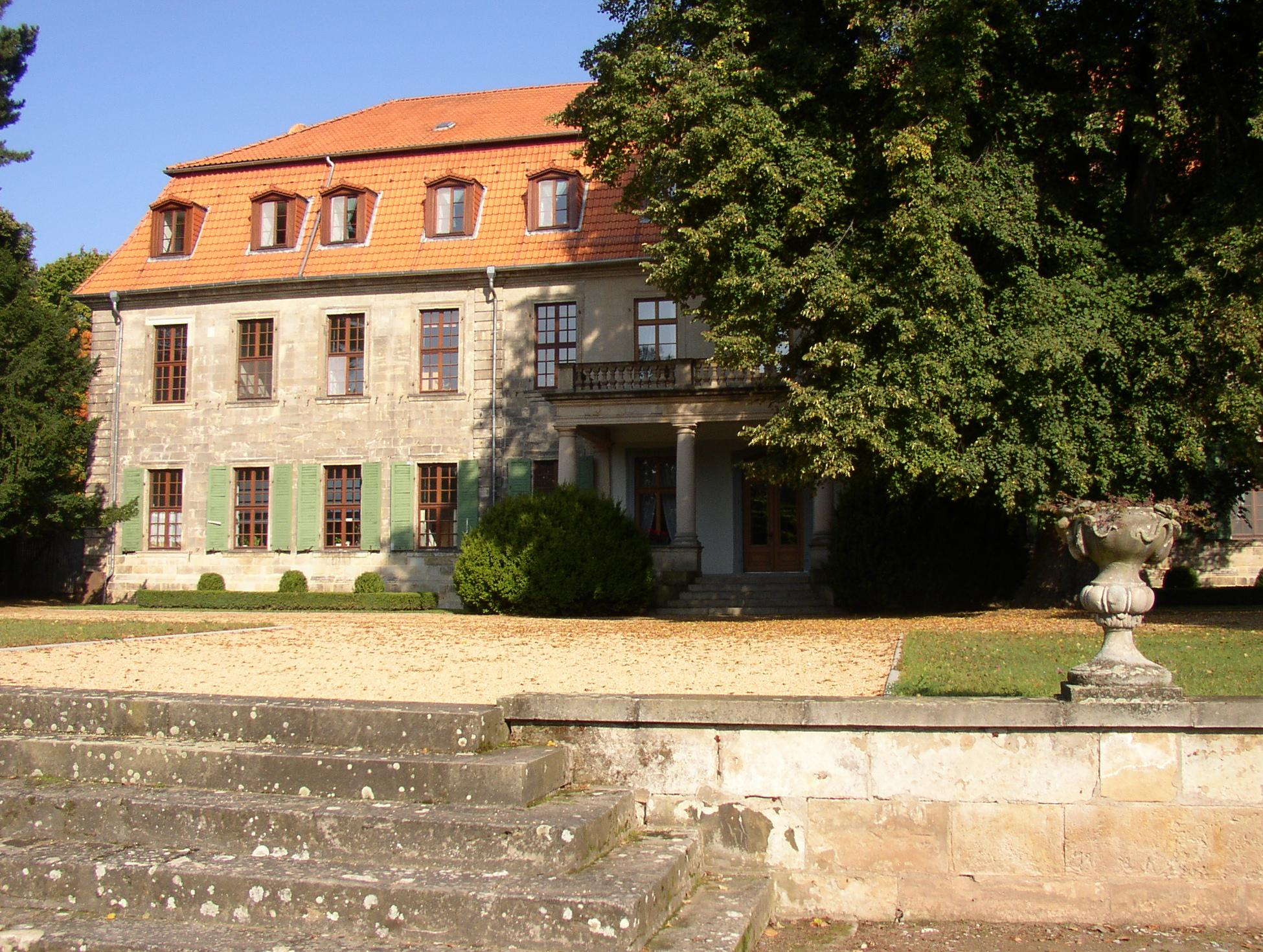
Palace
