= Athenstedt =

- Stadtteil of Halberstadt
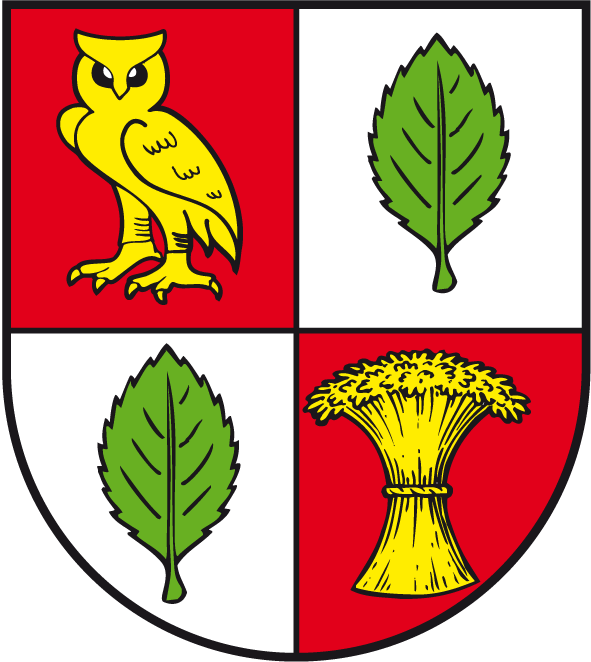
- Coat of arms
- Interactive map of Athenstedt
- Location within Germany Location within Saxony-Anhalt
- Coordinates: 51°56′N 10°55′E
- Country: Germany
- State: Saxony-Anhalt
- District: Harz
- Town: Halberstadt

Area
  - Total: 6.31 km^{2} (2.44 sq mi)
- Elevation: 164 m (538 ft)

Population (2006-12-31)
  - Total: 431
  - Density: 68.3/km^{2} (177/sq mi)
- Time zone: UTC+01:00 (CET)
  - Summer (DST): UTC+02:00 (CEST)
- Postal codes: 38822
- Dialling codes: 039427
- Vehicle registration: HZ
- Website: www.harzvorland-huy.de

Athenstedt is a village and a former municipality in the district of Harz, in Saxony-Anhalt, Germany.

Since 1 January 2010, it is part of the town Halberstadt.
