= Langenstein-Zwieberge =

Coordinates: 51°50′40″N 11°01′24″E

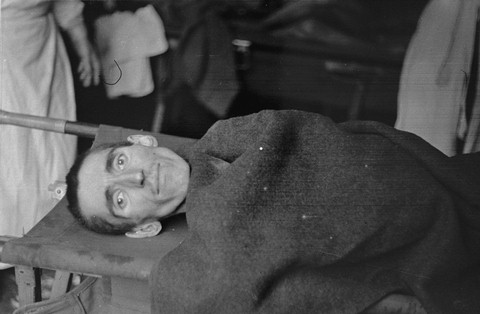
A survivor transported by American medics

The Langenstein-Zwieberge was a concentration camp, a subcamp of the Buchenwald concentration camp. More than 7000 prisoners from 23 countries were imprisoned there between April 1944 and April 1945. The camp was situated in the village of Langenstein, Saxony-Anhalt, which has since been absorbed into the town of Halberstadt.

== History ==
The first group of deportees from Buchenwald arrived on 21 April 1944. They formed the executives of the prisoner functionary. They were initially placed in an inn of the periphery of Langenstein, then, the convoys following one another, while waiting for the completion of the construction of the camp, in a barn, which still exists, located at the exit of the village. Six convoys arrived, from 26 September 1944 to 18 February 1945.

The construction of the camp was completed in August 1944 with the electrified enclosure; 7 blocks plus the appendices (Revier, kitchen, etc.)replaced the inn and the barn. When the number of prisoners reached 5,100, in February 1945, there were 18 blocks.

The number of prisoners decreased then (4,400 people at the beginning of April 1945), the number of deaths exceeded the number of the newcomers by far.

In the week from 19 to 25 March 1945, Langenstein had the most dead of all Buchenwald sub camps, 234 of 1308 overall dead, in front of Ohrdruf (207) and Leau (69). By this time, medical supplies were exhausted, and the Revier (camp infirmary) had become merely a place where the sick were left to die.

At first, the corpses were transported to Quedlinburg for cremation, but when fuel became scarce, mass graves were dug near the camp. Prisoners were forced to bury their comrades in the mass graves. Testimonies from survivors describe unbearable scenes of suffering and the constant presence of death within the camp.

On 9 April 1945, with American forces approaching, about 3,000 prisoners were evacuated on foot in several columns. Many perished during these forced marches, either shot by guards or dying of exhaustion. The camp was liberated on 12 April 1945 by units of the U.S. 8th Armored Division, who found approximately 1400 survivors in a state of extreme weakness. Piles of bodies were discovered near the barracks and inside the tunnels.

After the liberation, the victims were buried in a mass grave inside the camp, which is nowadays the southern mass grave. Investigations (US war crimes commotion) were carried out into the crimes committed by the SS. A memorial was inaugurated in 1949 to commemorate the victims, and later a museum was opened on the site. In 1976, the Langenstein-Zwieberge Museum was opened. It has preserved part of the original tunnels and exhibits documents, photographs, and testimonies of survivors.

Today, the site stands as a place of remembrance dedicated to the thousands of prisoners who suffered and died there. Educational programs and commemorative events continue to be organized to honor their memory and to raise awareness about the system of forced labor under the Nazi regime.

== Work ==
As of the first days of their arrival, the deportees started to dig galleries in the still virgin site of the hills of Thekenberge. In ten months of terrible sufferings, the prisoners completed nearly 13 km of galleries, of a surface of 70.000 m^{2}. Some were enough vast to accommodate trains of coaches.

Prisoners worked in two 12-hour, or in 8-hour shifts under atrocious conditions, in dust, insufficient air, and under the blows of the kapos. Many returned to the camp exhausted, with barely enough energy to eat their soup.

The principal goal of the excavations was to hide production facilities for the Junkers factories to build new types of jets and weapons. With this in mind, the Junkers firm arranged a small camp of three huts inside the large camp in edge of the place of call to place there deportees specialists, 869 people, arrivals of Kommandos of Halberstadt, Aschersleben, Langensalza, and Niederorschel.

The small camp, with neither reed nor straw mattress, the prisoners, like the others, were forced to dig tunnels.

== Deaths ==
Dead prisoners were initially sent to Quedlinburg by horse-drawn car. The ashes of 912 victims, including 131 French, rest in the cemetery of this city.

In March, the crematory couldn't continue its work and the bodies could no longer be brought to Quedlinburg. They were buried, first in five large pits outside the camp that contain more than 700, or close to Revier, and after liberation inside the camp.

The corpses were transported, by two, in wooden cases carried by four prisoners after work. They emptied the cases into the pits and the downward file was going to seek a new loading until almost complete exhaustion of the mass grave. The last bodies, in full decomposition, untransportable, remained in the hut.

== Liberation of the camp ==
On 12 April 1945, the US 8th Armored Division, 83rd Infantry Division liberated the camp.

The first Allied soldier in the camp, First Lieutenant Raymond L. Reed, a medic with the U.S. 8th Armored Division writes, "Sometime between Apr. 10 – 15th I found Langenstein concentration camp when the townspeople told me there was a "Concentrations-lager" on the hill overlooking the town. I opened the gates and not a sound from the camp, no dogs, no guards, nothing. Drew my P-38 from my holster & opened the door of the 1st barrack & found a horrible sight – emaciated men 3 to 4 to a bunk, some dead, some alive. No reaction – living zombies just stared at me. Estimated 1,000 alive. Radioed back for field hospital. Only 100 remained alive 1 week later. Took book on prisoners from headquarters and gave to my commanding officer – prisoners fed only water and potato peels."

First Allied infantry soldiers to discover the camp, PFCs Norman Panagos and Irving "Ike" Olshaker of M Company, 331st Regiment, 83rd Infantry Division, report seeing German jeeps exiting the rear of the camp as the infantrymen approach the front gate. GIs were stunned at the sight and smell, and handed out what little rations and cigarettes they had on them.

Excerpt from an after action report of the 78th Armored Medical Battalion concerning the Langenstein concentration camp:

"A camp for political prisoners. In fact it was an "extermination" camp, the inmates being forced to work about 15 hour per day in the nearby mine on a small ration of dry bread and water. When prisoners became too weak to work there were generally executed by the SS guards. Mortality averaged about 300 per month. They were buried in communal graves, a new layer being added each day. Number presently is about 1100, all male, roughly divided as follows—300 Poles, 200 Russians, 200 French, 100 Belgians and Dutch, 200 Czechs and 100 Germans.

As a consequence of bad treatment by the Germans during the last days of their regime, the present death rate is between 25 and 30 per day. The average weight of the patients is 60 lbs, due to malnutrition. The men are all lousy and the barracks and wooden beds are full of lice, there is no report of typhus. Practically all have dysentery. Most of the inmates are stretcher cases."

An excerpt from an article in Stars and Stripes, Friday April 20, 1945, reads, "The smell of death was there, even among the still living. In the hospital were those about to die. There was one man who had been beaten about the hips for stealing potato peelings. He just didn't have any flesh there any more. The rest of the men in the hospital had dysentery. They lay there in their own excrement, too weak to move. One man, stronger than the rest, stood at the door. He wore only a short nightshirt. You could see he had no thighs, no calves, no hips. His legs were bones with great knobs for knees. His body was a skeleton covered with taut, gray skin."

On 18 April all these patients were taken by military ambulances to a barracks of Halberstadt which had been transformed into a hospital. The majority of the evacuees died there in the days that followed. Their remains rest in a common grave in the city cemetery.

== The Langenstein-Zwieberge Memorial ==
On 11 September 1949 a memorial and a commemorative plaque were inaugurated at the place of the common graves. Since 1976 there exists a museum on the ground of the Memorial of Langenstein-Zwieberge.

== References and sources ==
=== Testimonies ===
- Adler, H. G. Panorama. Roman in 10 Bildern. Olten 1968. (München: Piper 1988.)
- Adler, H. G. Der Wahrheit verpflichtet. Gerlingen 1998.
- Adler, H. G. Eine Reise. Wien: Zsolnay 1999.
- Berti, Alberto. Die Reise zum Planeten der Nazis. Trieste – Buchenwald – Langenstein. Mailand 1989.
- Bertrand, Louis. Nummer 85250. Konzentrationslager Buchenwald – Aussenkommando Langenstein-Zwieberge. Témoignage. Valdoie: Prête-moi ta plume 2005.
- Berzins-Birze, Miervaldis. Im Todeslager von Salaspilsk. Riga 1964.
- Burelli, Dino: Mamma sto bene... non mi sono fatto niente... Udine: A.P.O. 2006.
- Campredon, Gabriel. Louis Dalle un homme libre. Saint Chély-d'Apcher: Association "Louis Dalle un homme libre" 5. Auflage 2002.
- Comité "Fidélité". Jean Lepicier. Jociste angevin. Déporté et mort à Buchenwald (Kdo Langenstein). 1992.
- Coupechoux, Roger. La nuit de Walpurgis. Avoir vingt ans à Langenstein. Paris: L'Harmattan 2004.
- Gaben, Lucien. L'honneur d'être témoin. Albi: Imprimerie coopérative du sud ouest 1990.
- Hager, Konrad. Protokoll des Unbegreiflichen. Aus dem Tagebuch eines Landpfarrers. Halberstadt o.J.
- Ivanij, Ivan. Schattenspringen. Wien: Picus 1993.
- Ivanij, Ivan. Die andere Seite der Ewigkeit. Zwanzig Geschichten vom Tod. Wien: Picus 1994.
- Klieger, Bernard. Le chemin que nous avons fait. Bruxelles: Editions BEKA 1946.
- Klieger, Bernard. Der Weg, den wir gingen. Bruxelles: Codac Juifs 1960.
- De Lecat, Basqual. Le miracle. Mulhouse: Imprimerie Bader 1963.
- Le Goupil, Paul. La route des crématoires. Labergement: L'Amitié par le livre 1962/1983.
- Le Goupil, Paul. Un Normand dans… Itinéraire d'une guerre 1939-1945. Paris: Editions Tirésias Michel Reynaud 1991.
- Le Goupil, Paul. Erinnerungen eines Normannen 1939-1945. Paris: Editions Tirésias Michel Reynaud 1995.
- Leroyer, Roger. Clamavi ad te… j'ai crié vers toi j'ai tellement crié vers toi… Cestas: Eigenverlag des Authors 1996.
- Leroyer, Roger. Clamavi ad te. Jena: Bussert & Stadeler 2003.
- Lustiger, Gila. Die Bestandsaufnahme. Berlin: Aufbau Taschenbuch 1996.
- Molette, Charles. Gérard Cendrier. Scout en franciscain mort à Buchenwald en 1945. "L'un des cinquante". Magny-les-Hameaux: Socéval 2006.
- de Montangon, Jean. Un Saint-Cyrien des années 40. Éditions France-Empire 1987.
- Obréjan, Maurice. L'étrange destinée d'un homme trois fois français. Paris: La Pensée Universelle 1994.
- Pannier, Roger. Jusqu'au martyre. Éditions des Etannets 1995.
- Maître Pierre Antoine Perrod. L'honneur d'être dupe. Éditions Horvath 1982.
- Petit, Georges. Retour à Langenstein. Une expérience de la déportation. Paris: Belin 2001.
- Petit, Georges. Rückkehr nach Langenstein. Erfahrungen eines Deportierten. Hürth bei Köln: Edition Memoria 2004.
- de Saint Marc, Hélie. Mémoires - Les champs de braises. Paris: Perrin 1995 (2002).
- de Saint Marc, Hélie. Asche und Glut: Erinnerungen. Friedberg: Edition AtlantiS 1998.
- de Saint Marc, Hélie. Les sentinelles du soir. Paris: Les Arènes 1999.
- de Saint Marc, Hélie. Die Wächter des Abends. Friedberg: Edition AtlantiS 2000.
- de Saint Marc, Hélie und August von Kageneck. Notre histoire 1922-1945. Paris: Les Arènes 2002.
- de Saint Marc, Hélie. Toute une vie. Paris: Les Arènes 2004.
- Sarkowicz, Hans (Hg.) "Als der Krieg zu Ende war…". Erinnerungen an den 8. Mai 1945. Frankfurt a. M. und Leipzig: Insel 1995.
- Sauvot, Jean. Tu raconteras à ton fils. Éditions Vent de Crau 1985.
- de Wijze, Louis. Ontsnapping uit de dodenmarsch. Amsterdam: De Bataafsche Leeuw 1995.
- de Wijze, Louis. Only my life: a survivor's story. New York: St. Martin's Press 1997.
- de Wijze, Louis. Rien que ma vie. Récit d'un rescapé. Paris: L'Harmattan 2001.
- Willner, Eddie, testimony to US Holocaust Memorial Museum and Steven Spielberg Shoah Foundation.
- Wojnowski, Edmund. Człowiek przetrzymał. Gdańsk: Zrzeszenie Kaszubsk´-Pomorskie 1985.
- Wojnowski, Edmund. Egzamin Dojrzałości. Toruń: Wydawnictwo "Żywe Kamienie" 2000.

=== Specialized literature ===
- Baccaria, Laurent. Commandant de Saint-Marc. Paris: Édition académique Perrin 1989.
- Jakob, Volker und Annet van der Voort. Anne Frank war nicht allein. Lebensgeschichten deutscher Juden in den Niederlanden. Berlin und Bonn: J.H.W. Dietz Nachf. 1988.
- Fauser, Ellen (Hrsg.). Die Kraft im Unglück. Erinnerungen an Langenstein-Zwieberge - Außenlager des KZ Buchenwald. Halberstadt o. J.
- Landeszentrale für politische Bildung Sachsen-Anhalt (Hg). Verortet. Erinnern und Gedenken in Sachsen-Anhalt. Magdeburg 2004.
- Le Goupil, Paul und Roger Leroyer. Mémorial des Français déportés au camp de Langenstein-Zwieberge. Kommando de Buchenwald. Luneray : Imp. Bertout o. J.
- Lustiger, Arno. Zum Kampf auf Leben und Tod. Vom Widerstand der Juden 1933-1945. Köln: Kiepenheuer & Witsch 1994.

== See also ==
- List of Nazi-German concentration camps
