= Sargstedt =

- Stadtteil of Halberstadt
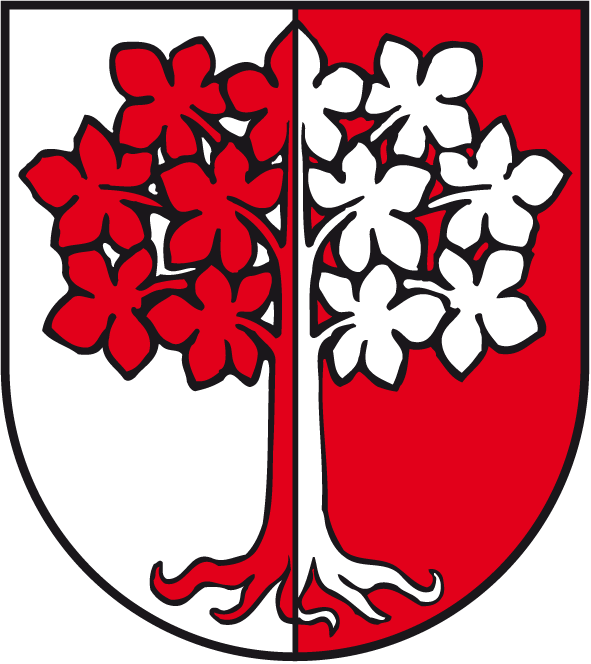
- Coat of arms
- Interactive map of Sargstedt
- Location within Germany Location within Saxony-Anhalt
- Coordinates: 51°56′21″N 10°59′13″E
- Country: Germany
- State: Saxony-Anhalt
- District: Harz
- Town: Halberstadt

Area
  - Total: 11.88 km^{2} (4.59 sq mi)
- Elevation: 144 m (472 ft)

Population (2006-12-31)
  - Total: 734
  - Density: 61.8/km^{2} (160/sq mi)
- Time zone: UTC+01:00 (CET)
  - Summer (DST): UTC+02:00 (CEST)
- Postal codes: 38822
- Dialling codes: 039425
- Vehicle registration: HZ
- Website: www.harzvorland-huy.de

Sargstedt is a village and a former municipality in the district of Harz, in Saxony-Anhalt, Germany.

Since 1 January 2010, it is part of the town Halberstadt.
