= Halberstadt =

Town in Saxony-Anhalt, Germany

- Town
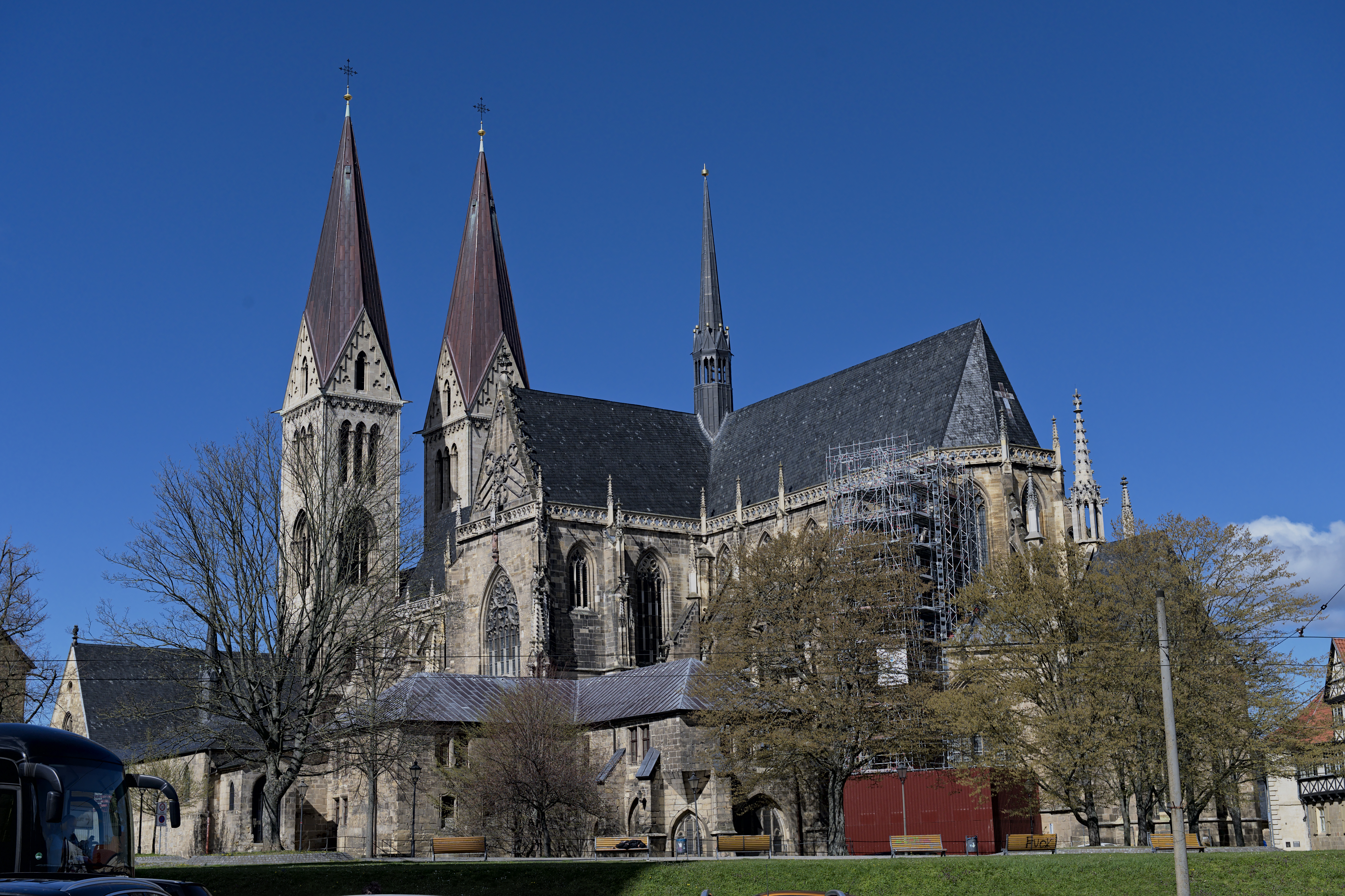
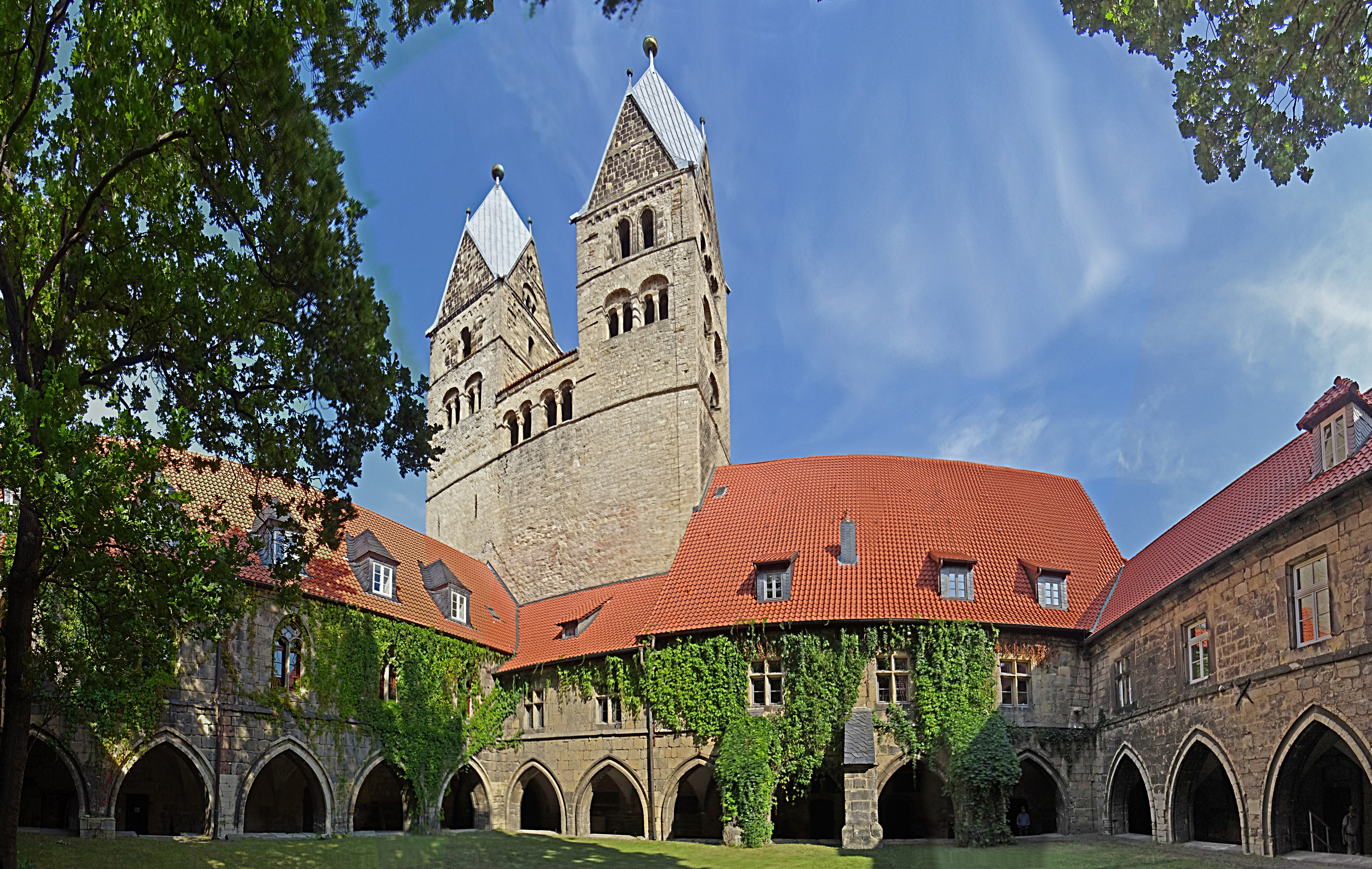
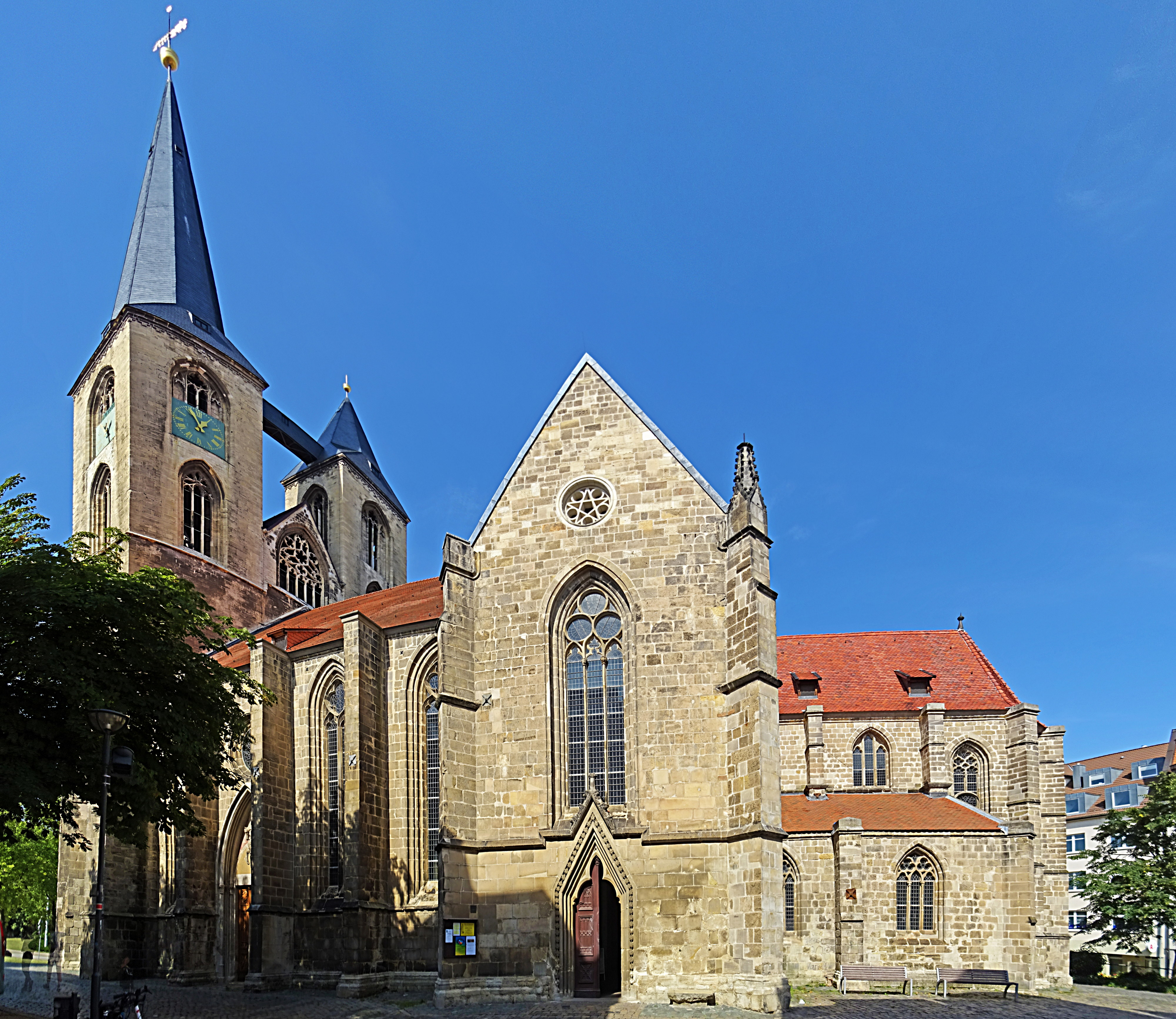
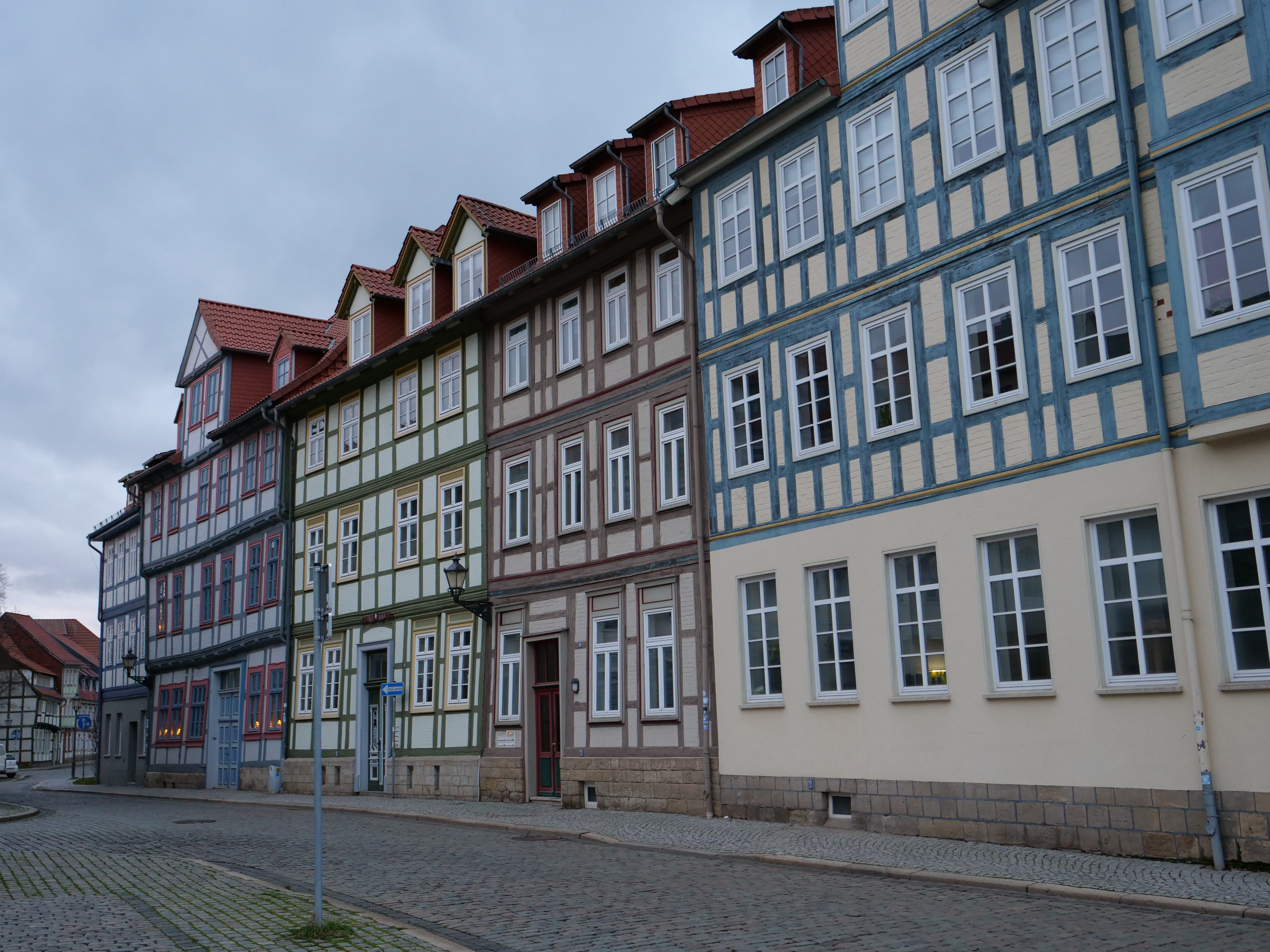
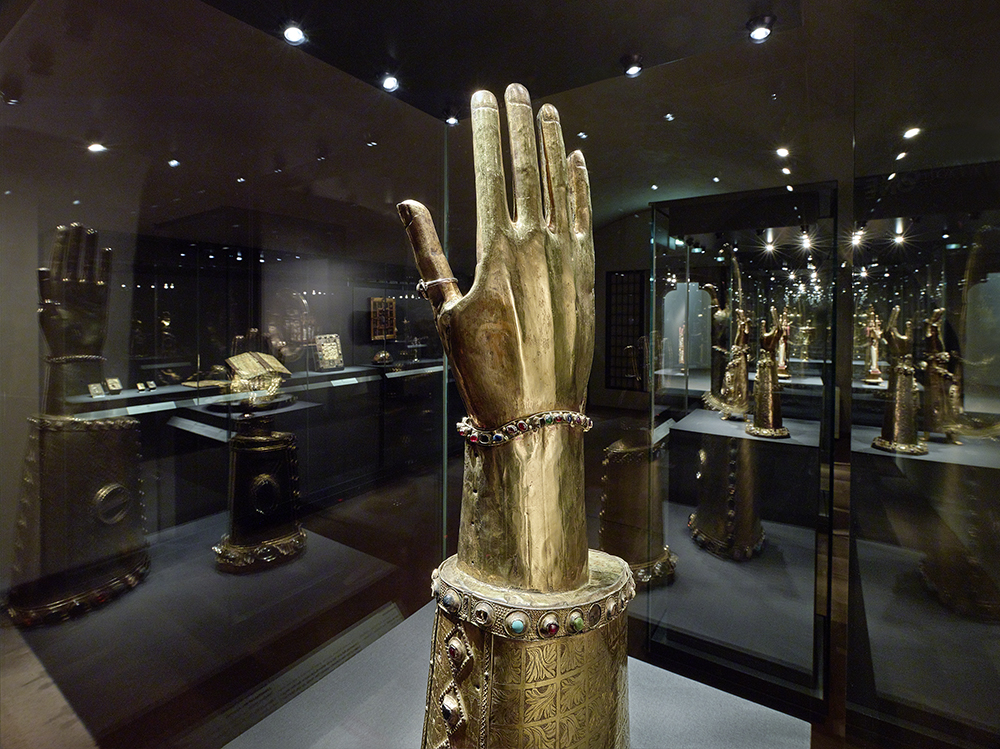
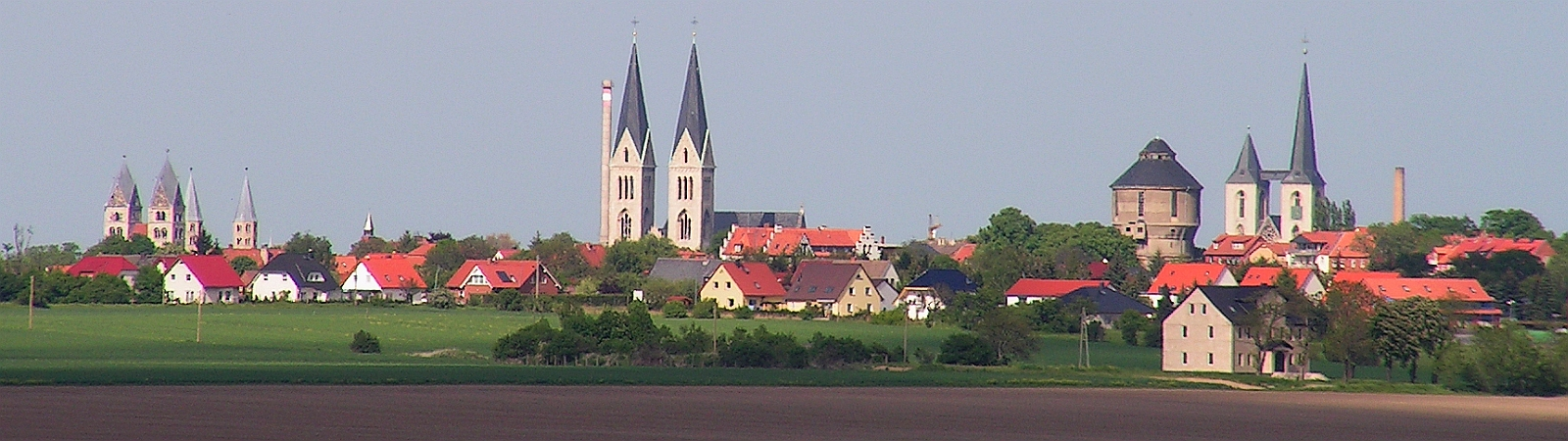
- Halberstadt Cathedral Liebfrauenkirche St. Martini Timber framed houses in the city centre Cathedral treasure Halberstadt city centre

- Coat of arms

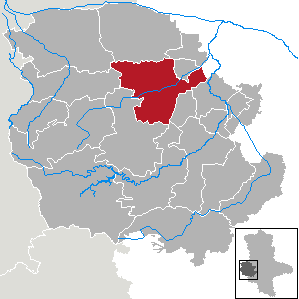
- Location of Halberstadt within Harz district
- Interactive map of Halberstadt
- Location within Germany Location within Saxony-Anhalt
- Coordinates: 51°53′45″N 11°2′48″E
- Country: Germany
- State: Saxony-Anhalt
- District: Harz
- Subdivisions: 7 Ortschaften

Government
  - Mayor (2020–27): Daniel Szarata (CDU)

Area
  - Total: 142.98 km^{2} (55.20 sq mi)
- Elevation: 119 m (390 ft)

Population (2025-12-31)
  - Total: 36,615
  - Density: 256.08/km^{2} (663.26/sq mi)
- Time zone: UTC+01:00 (CET)
  - Summer (DST): UTC+02:00 (CEST)
- Postal codes: 38820
- Dialling codes: 03941
- Vehicle registration: HZ, HBS, QLB, WR
- Website: www.halberstadt.de

Halberstadt (German pronunciation: [ˈhalbɐˌʃtat]; Eastphalian: Halverstidde) is a town in the state of Saxony-Anhalt in central Germany, the capital of Harz district. Located north of the Harz mountain range, it is known for its old town center, which was largely destroyed by Allied bombings in the late stages of World War II after local Nazi leaders refused to surrender. The town was rebuilt in the following decades.

In World War I Halberstadt was the site of a German military airbase and aircraft-manufacturing facilities. In World War II Halberstadt was a regional production center for Junkers aircraft, which also housed an SS forced labor camp. Halberstadt now includes the area where the Langenstein-Zwieberge concentration camp was situated.

Today the city has around 450 timber framed houses in its city centre and timber framed old villages like Langenstein.

== Geography ==
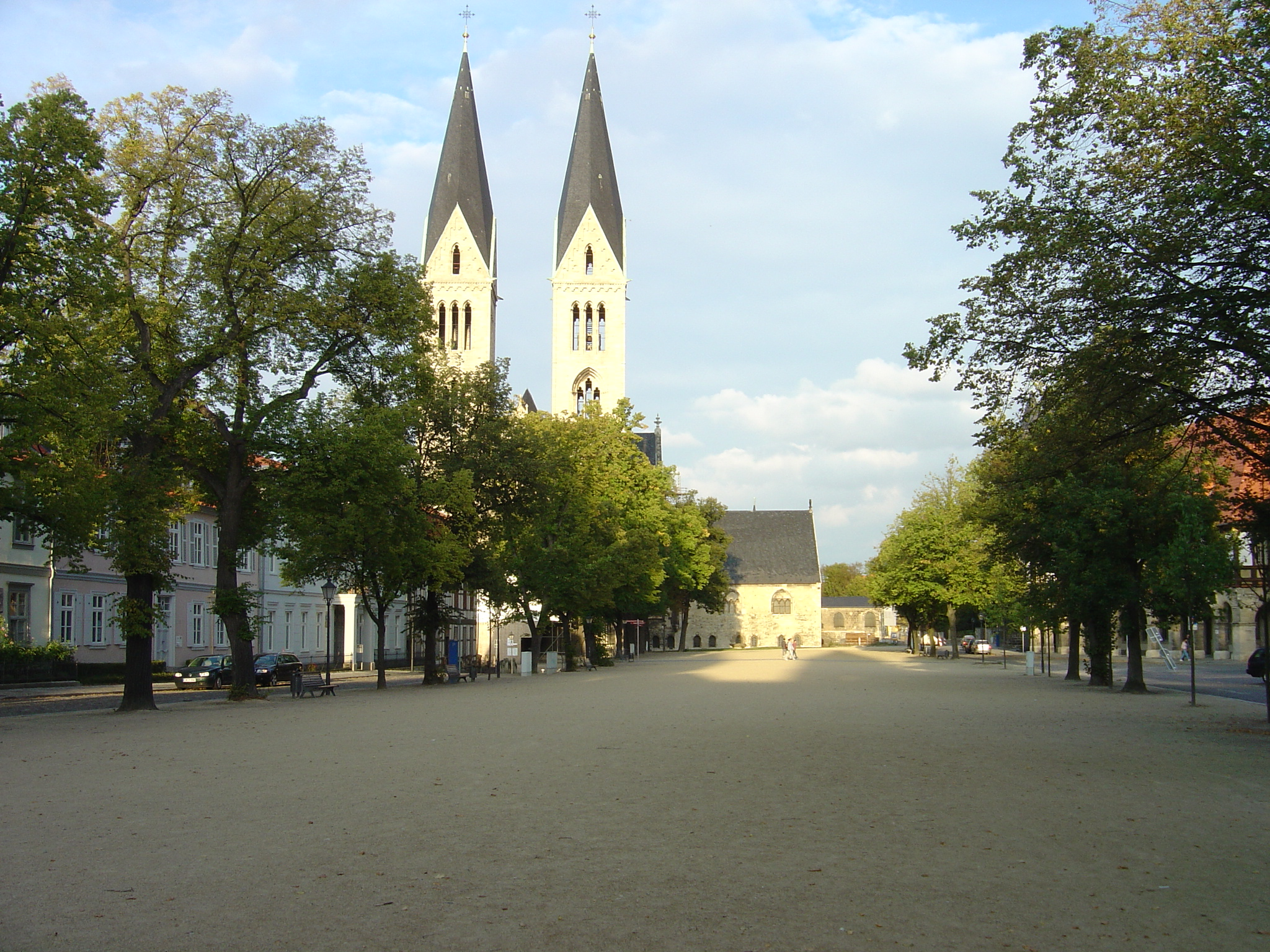
Cathedral square

Halberstadt is situated between the Harz in the south and the Huy hills in the north on the Holtemme and Goldbach rivers, both left tributaries of the Bode. Halberstadt is the base of the Department of Public Management of the Hochschule Harz University of Applied Studies and Research.

The town center retains many important historic buildings and much of its ancient townscape. Notable places in Halberstadt include Halberstadt Cathedral, the Church of Our Lady (Liebfrauenkirche) and St Martin's, churches built in the 12th and 13th centuries. Halberstadt is the site of the first documented large, permanent pipe organ installation in 1361. The cathedral is notable among those in northern European towns in having retained its medieval treasury in virtually complete condition. Among its treasures are the oldest surviving tapestries in Europe, dating from the 12th century. The town is also a stop on the scenic German Timber-Frame Road.

=== Divisions ===
The town of Halberstadt consists of Halberstadt proper and the following Ortschaften or municipal divisions:

- Aspenstedt
- Athenstedt
- Emersleben
- Klein Quenstedt
- Langenstein
- Sargstedt
- Schachdorf Ströbeck

These are all formerly independent municipalities: Emersleben was absorbed into Halberstadt in 1995, Klein Quenstedt in 1996 and Aspenstedt, Athenstedt, Langenstein, Sargstedt and Schachdorf Ströbeck in 2010.

== History ==
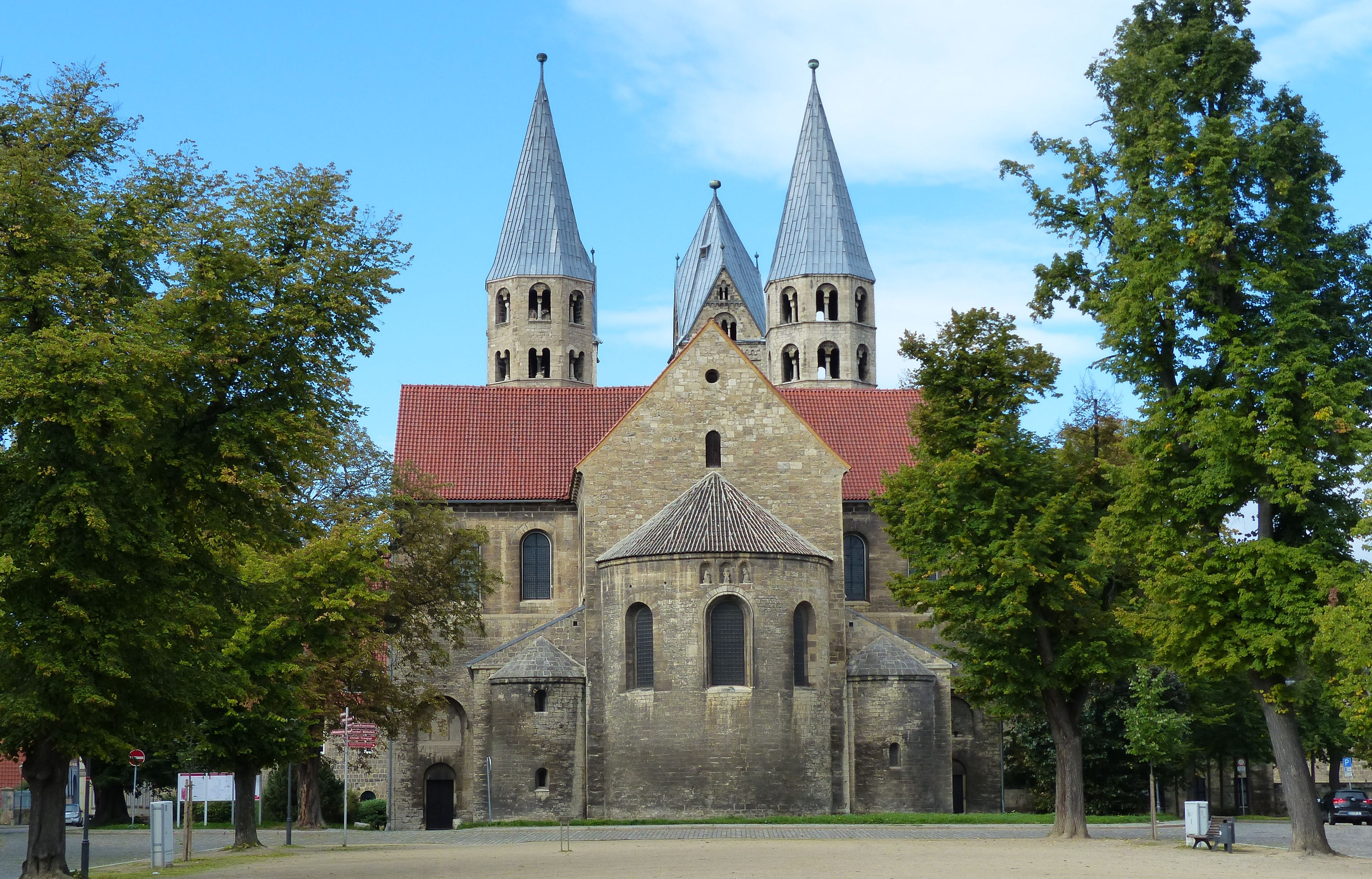
Liebfrauenkirche

In 814 the Carolingian emperor Louis the Pious made the Christian mission in the German stem duchy of Saxony the episcopal see of the Diocese of Halberstadt. It was granted market rights by King Otto III in 989. The town became the administrative centre of the Saxon Harzgau and an important trading location. The Halberstadt bishops had the Church of Our Lady erected from about 1005 onwards. In his fierce conflict with Emperor Frederick Barbarossa, the forces of the Saxon duke Henry the Lion devastated the town in 1179.

On Henry's downfall, the Halberstadt diocese was elevated to a prince-bishopric about 1180. Its cathedral was rebuilt from 1236 and consecrated in 1491. Halberstadt, Quedlinburg and Aschersleben joined a league of towns (Halberstädter Dreistädtebund) in 1326; from 1387 the city was also a member of the Hanse.

From 1479 the diocese was administered by the Archbishops of Magdeburg. While the Halberstadt citizens turned Protestant around 1540, the cathedral chapter elected Prince Henry Julius of Brunswick-Wolfenbüttel first Lutheran bishop in 1566. During the Thirty Years' War the town was occupied by the troops of Albrecht von Wallenstein in 1629 and temporarily re-Catholicized according to the imperial Edict of Restitution. According to the 1648 Peace of Westphalia the prince-bishopric was finally secularized to the Principality of Halberstadt held by Brandenburg-Prussia. The first secular governor was Joachim Friedrich von Blumenthal. In 1699, Swiss religious refugees founded a French Reformed community in the town.

Halberstadt became part of the newly established Kingdom of Prussia in 1701. From 1747 Johann Wilhelm Ludwig Gleim worked here as a government official and made his home an intellectual centre of the German Enlightenment (his house, the Gleimhaus, is now a museum). Under the 1807 Treaty of Tilsit the town became part of the Kingdom of Westphalia, a Napoleonic client-state and administrative seat of the Westphalian Department of Saale. On 29 July 1809 a Westphalian regiment was defeated by the Black Brunswickers under Prince Frederick William of Brunswick-Wolfenbüttel in the Battle of Halberstadt.

After the defeat of Napoleon the town was restored to Prussia and subsequently administered within the Province of Saxony. From 1815 Halberstadt was home to the Prussian 7th (Magdeburg) Cuirassiers "von Seydlitz" regiment, with Otto von Bismarck in the rank of an officer à la suite from 1868. The town's economy was decisively promoted by the opening of the Magdeburg–Halberstadt Railway in 1843. The tramway was inaugurated in 1903.

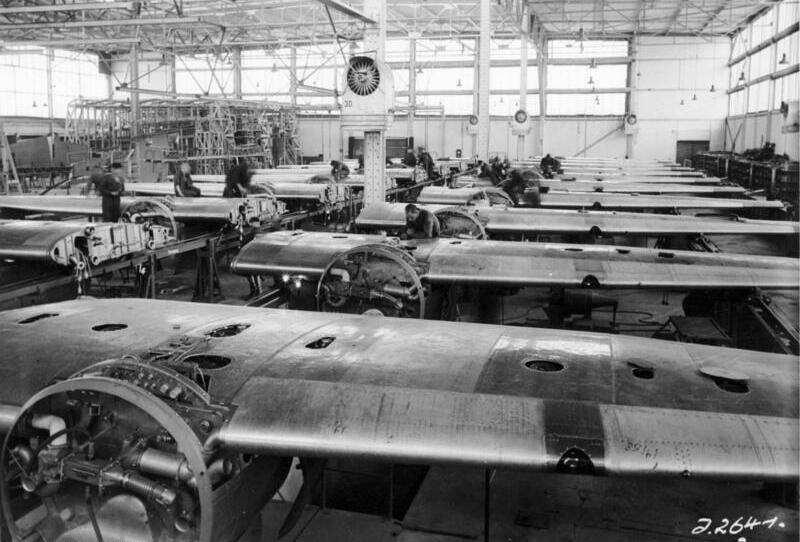
Junkers Ju 88 wing production

In 1912 the Halberstädter Flugzeugwerke aircraft manufacturer was founded followed by the opening of a military airbase, providing the German Luftstreitkräfte in World War I. After the war it had to close down in accordance with the regulations of the Treaty of Versailles, until in the course of the German re-armament, it opened again in 1935 as a branch of the Junkers company in Dessau. The aircraft factory was the site of an SS forced labor camp, one of several subcamps of Buchenwald; the production facilities and the nearby Luftwaffe airbase were targets of Allied bombing during the 'Big Week' in February 1944.

In the last days of World War II, in April 1945, US forces approached Halberstadt as they attacked remaining Nazi troops in the short-lived Harz pocket. They dropped leaflets instructing Halberstadt's Nazi leader to fly a white flag on the town hall as a token of surrender. He refused and no white flag was raised. On 8 April 1945, 218 B-17 Flying Fortresses of the 8th Air Force, accompanied by 239 escort fighters, dropped 595 tons of bombs on the center of Halberstadt. This killed about 2,500 people and converted most of the old town into some 1.5 million cubic meters of rubble, which American troops briefly occupied three days later. Around 450 of the 1600 timber framed houses survived in the city centre. By June 1945, the town and its garrison was handed over to the 3rd Shock Army of the Soviet Red Army forces.

Halberstadt was part of newly established Saxony-Anhalt from 1945 to 1952, after which it was within Bezirk Magdeburg in East Germany. During the Peaceful Revolution in Autumn 1989 St Martin's Church was a centre of the Swords to ploughshares movement. After the reunification of Germany Halberstadt became part of the restored state of Saxony-Anhalt.

=== Jewish culture ===
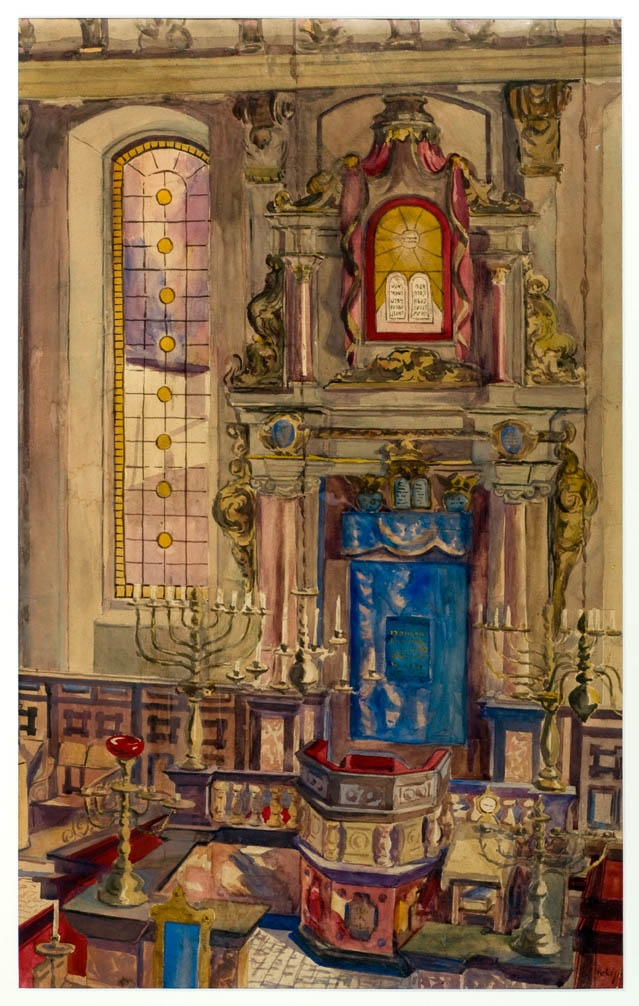
Interior of Halberstadt Synagogue in 1930 (watercolor painting by Käthe Lipke)

Halberstadt's Jewish community is mentioned in records from the 13th century and the town had a synagogue in 1464. In the early 18th century, Halberstadt had one of the largest Jewish communities in central Europe and was known as a center of theology and learning after Berend Lehmann (1661–1730) founded a beth midrash there in 1703. The building, called the "Klaus", included a library and living quarters for scholars to study the Talmud. Lehmann also financed an impressive Baroque synagogue that was completed in 1712.

Halberstadt's synagogue was ransacked and burned in the 9 November 1938 Kristallnacht pogrom. The synagogue's Torah scrolls were removed and burned in the street. On 18 November 1938, the local building authority ordered the demolition of the synagogue and required the Jewish community to pay the cost of the work.

Today the Moses Mendelssohn Academy is based in the "Klaus", providing exhibitions, presentations, and information about Jewish culture.

=== One of the world's slowest, longest "concerts" ===
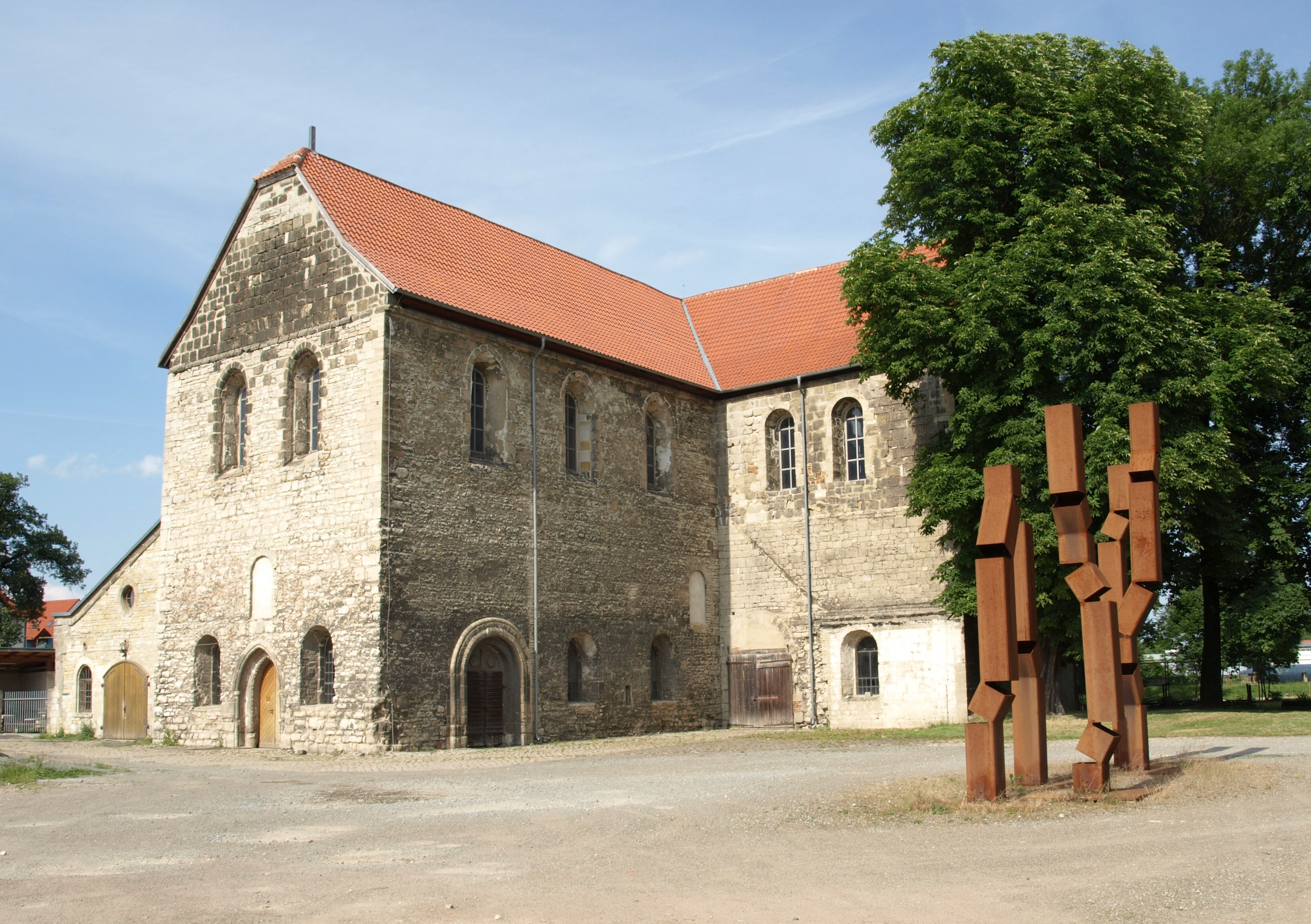
Sankt-Burchardi-Church

A performance of John Cage's organ piece As Slow As Possible began in the Burchardikirche in Halberstadt in September 2001; the performance is scheduled to take 639 years. The concert began on 5 September 2001 with a rest lasting 17 months. On August 5, 2026 an A4 pipe was added to the organ to make an eight note chord which was witnessed by visitors from around the world. The next sound change is scheduled for October 5, 2027.

== Education ==
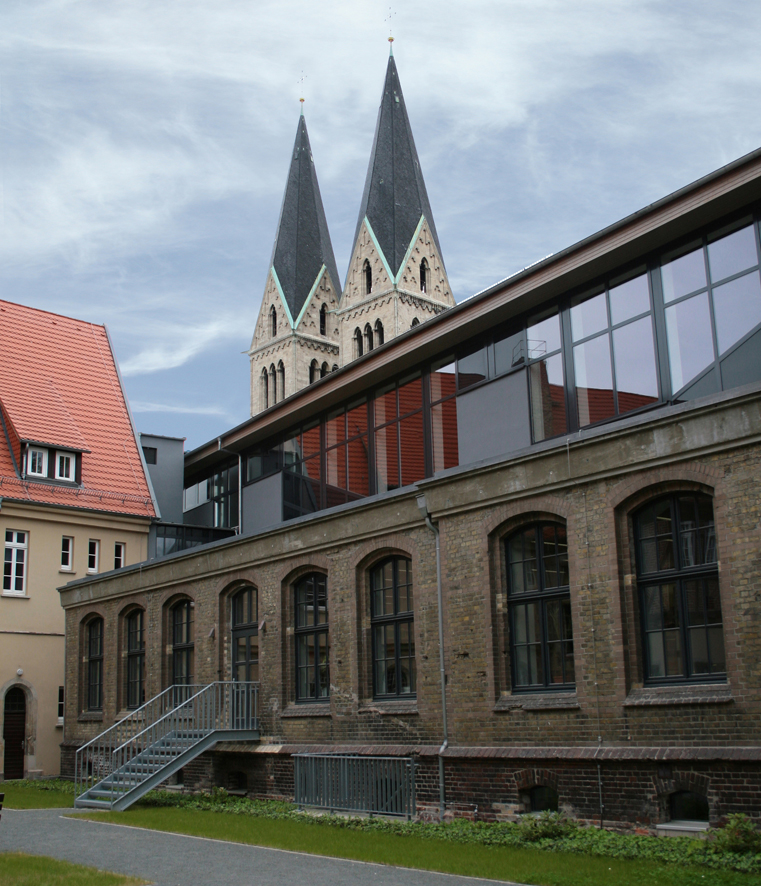
Department of Public Management of the Harz University of Applied Studies

Halberstadt is site of the Harz University of Applied Studies.

== Transport ==
The town can be reached via the Bundesstraße 6n (since 2019 called Bundesautobahn 36), 79, 81, and 245 federal highways. Halberstadt Hauptbahnhof is an important railway hub on the Magdeburg–Thale and Halle–Vienenburg lines, mainly served by Transdev Sachsen-Anhalt.

Halberstädter Verkehrs-GmbH operates the city's public transport system, comprising the Halberstadt tramway network of two lines, and six city bus lines.

== Sport ==
Germania Halberstadt is a football club that plays in Halberstadt.

== Notable people ==
- Caspar Abel, theologian, historian, and poet
- Albert of Saxony (philosopher), logician, physicist, and Bishop of Halberstadt from 1366 to 1399
- Gabriel Bach, (1927 - 2022), a German-born Israeli jurist, who was a judge of the Supreme Court of Israel and deputy prosecutor in the prosecution of Adolf Eichmann
- Johann Christian Josef Abs, teacher and school administrator
- August Binkebank, Trompeter der Halberstädter Kürassiere, Freiligraths Trompeter von Mars-la-Tour
- Lily Braun, feminist writer
- Wibke Bruhns, journalist and author, author of My Father's Country
- Gottfried August Bürger, poet
- Oscar Carré, Circus director, founder of the Carré Theatre
- Karl Friedrich von Dacheröden, lawyer
- Johann Augustus Eberhard, theologian and philosopher
- Georg Fleischhauer, athlete and Olympic champion bobsledder
- Johann Wilhelm Ludwig Gleim, poet
- Adalbert of Hamburg, Archbishop of Hamburg-Bremen
- Ferdinand Heine, ornithologist
- Azriel Hildesheimer, rabbi
- Gustav Eduard von Hindersin, general
- Johann Georg Jacobi, poet
- Israel Jacobson, philanthropist and father of Reform Judaism
- Alexander Kluge, film director and author
- Issachar Berend Lehmann, banker, merchant, diplomatic agent and army contractor
- Paul Laurentius, theologian
- George Müller, Christian evangelist and administrator of orphanages
- Emil D. Munch, American politician
- Adolf Reubke, organ builder
- Eberhard Graf von Schmettow, general
- Jürgen Sparwasser, footballer and manager
- Adolf Stoecker, theologian and politician
- Friederike Vohs (1777–1860), operatic soprano
- Friedrich Voss, composer and pianist
- Helmut Weidling, general
- Andreas Werckmeister, organist and music theorist, from 1696 to 1706
- Walter Wislicenus, astronomer
- Carl Zillier, American politician
- Martin Bormann, private secretary to Adolf Hitler one of the fiercest criminals and anti-Semites of the 1900s

== Twin towns – sister cities ==
Halberstadt is twinned with:

- Banská Bystrica, Slovakia
- Náchod, Czech Republic
- Villars, France
- Wolfsburg, Germany
- Torredembarra, Spain

== See also ==
- Bishopric of Halberstadt, a Roman Catholic diocese and state of the Holy Roman Empire until the Peace of Westphalia
- Principality of Halberstadt, the secularized successor to the Bishopric of Halberstadt after the Peace of Westphalia
- Gebrüder Büttner Kaffeegroßrösterei, a former Halberstadt-based coffee roastery and import
- Halberstädter Würstchen
