= History of rail transport in Germany =

The history of rail transport in Germany can be traced back to the 16th century. The earliest form of railways, wagonways, were developed in Germany in the 16th century. Modern German rail history officially began with the opening of the steam-powered Bavarian Ludwig Railway between Nuremberg and Fürth on 7 December 1835. This had been preceded by the opening of the horse-drawn Prince William Railway on 20 September 1831. The first long-distance railway was the Leipzig-Dresden railway, completed on 7 April 1839.

== Forerunners ==
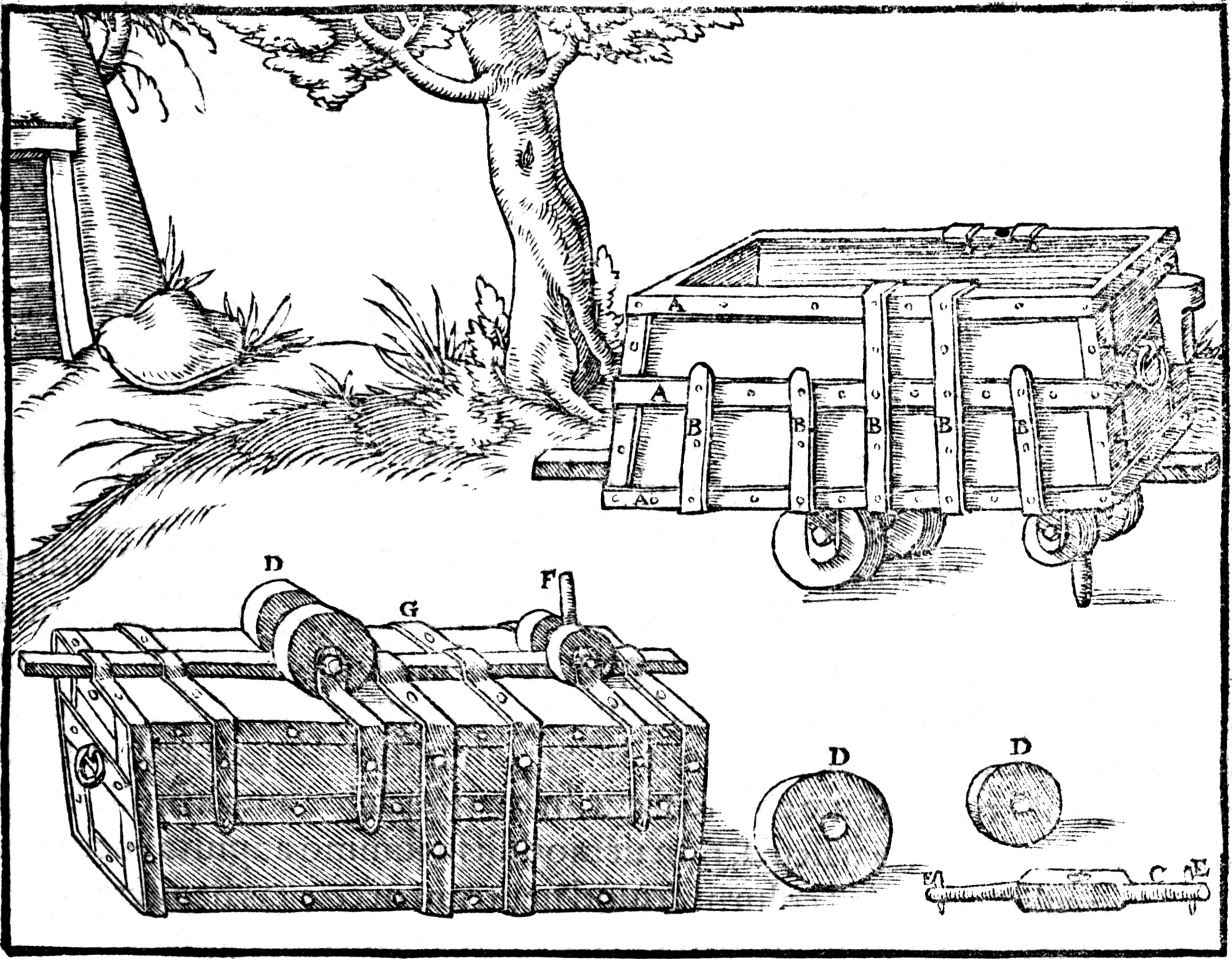
A German mine cart with a guide pin (in Fig. F), in a 1556 drawing by Georgius Agricola (De re metallica Libri XII), the forerunner of all modern railway wagons

The forerunner of the railway in Germany, as in England, was to be found mainly in association with the mining industry. Mine carts were used below ground for transportation, initially using wooden rails, and were steered either by a guide pin between the rails or by flanges on the wheels.

A wagonway operation was illustrated in Germany in 1556 by Georgius Agricola (image right) in his work De re metallica. This line used "Hund" carts with unflanged wheels running on wooden planks and a vertical pin on the truck fitting into the gap between the planks to keep it going the right way. The miners called the wagons Hunde ("dogs") from the noise they made on the tracks. Such wagonways soon became very popular in Europe.

From 1787, a network of wagonways, about 30 kilometres long, was also built above ground for the coal mines of the Ruhr in order to speed up the transportation of coal to loading quays on the River Ruhr. The system was horse-drawn, and was not available to the public as transport. Some of these tracks were already using iron rails – hence the German term for railway, Eisenbahn, which means "iron way". The Rauendahl Incline (de) in Bochum (1787) and the Schlebusch-Harkort Coal Railway (de) (1829) are examples of railways from those early days that can still be seen today. From 1827 to 1836, a wagonway was also built in Austria and Bohemia from Budweis to Gmunden via Linz (de).

The railways in Germany were given a significant impetus by the development of the first working locomotives in England (by Richard Trevithick in 1804 and John Blenkinsop in 1812) and the opening of the first public railway, the Stockton and Darlington Railway, in 1825. In Germany, even before the first real railways opened, there were attempts to use locomotives for railway operations. For example, in 1815, Johann Friedrich Krigar (de) built a copy of the Blenkinsop steam engine at the Royal Iron Foundry (de), Berlin, for Königshütte in Upper Silesia; and, in 1818, he built another locomotive for the 1.8-kilometre-long Friederiken-Schienenweg (de), a coal line near Geislautern in the Saarland, which had been converted in 1821 from wooden to iron rails. This engine worked, but failed to meet expectations due to its poor performance.

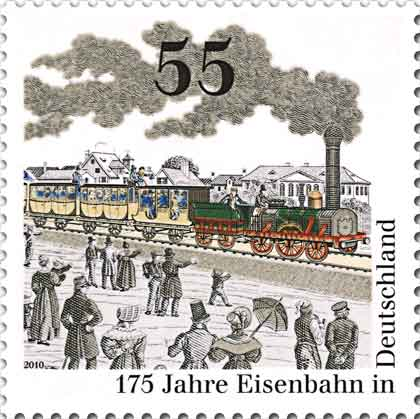
2010 postage stamp

== Railways before 1871 ==
In the first half of the 19th century, opinions about the emerging railways in Germany varied widely. While business-minded people like Friedrich Harkort and Friedrich List saw in the railway the possibility of stimulating the economy and overcoming the patronization of little states, and were already starting railway construction in the 1820s and early 1830s, others feared the fumes and smoke generated by locomotives or saw their own livelihoods threatened by them.

=== Development ===
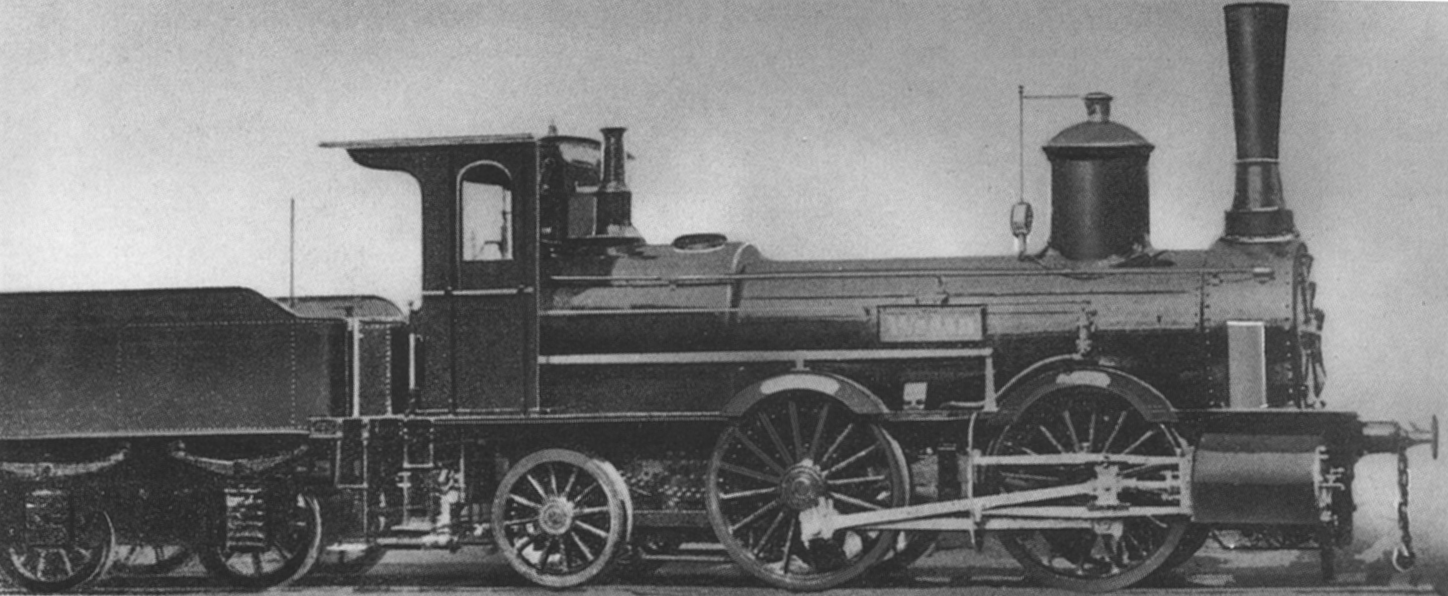
No. 302 of the private Mecklenburg Railway, built in 1866

The political disunity of three dozen states and a pervasive conservatism made it difficult to build railways in the 1830s, but the growing importance of the Zollverein made the construction of a coherent infrastructure a necessity. The initial impetus to build was hampered by complicated negotiations on land ownership. However, by the 1840s, trunk lines did link the major cities; each German state being responsible for the lines within its own borders.

During the 1820s, the nobility favoured costly and economically inefficient (but prestigious) canal projects over railways. In the 1830s, the growing liberal middle classes supported railways as a progressive innovation with benefits for the German people in general as well as for the shareholders in the joint stock companies that built and operated the railroads. Though private concerns such as the Nuremberg-Fürth Railway were superseded by state railway companies in the 1840s, the government companies copied many of the private companies' methods and organizational structures. Economist Friedrich List, speaking for the liberals, summed up the advantages to be derived from the development of the railway system in 1841:

First, as a means of national defence, it facilitates the concentration, distribution and direction of the army.
2. It is a means to the improvement of the culture of the nation.... It brings talent, knowledge and skill of every kind readily to market.
3. It secures the community against dearth and famine, and against excessive fluctuation in the prices of the necessaries of life.
4. It promotes the spirit of the nation, as it has a tendency to destroy the Philistine spirit arising from isolation and provincial prejudice and vanity. It binds nations by ligaments, and promotes an interchange of food and of commodities, thus making it feel a unit. The iron rails become a nervous system, which, on the one hand, strengthens public opinion, and, on the other hand, strengthens the power of the state for police and governmental purposes.

Lacking a technological base at first, the Germans imported their engineering and hardware from Britain, but quickly learned the skills needed to operate and expand the railways. In many cities, the new railway shops were the centres of technological awareness and training, so that by 1850, Germany was self-sufficient in meeting the demands of railroad construction, and the railways were a major impetus for the growth of the new steel industry.

The following years saw a rapid growth: By the year 1845, there were already more than 2,000 km of railway line in Germany; ten years later that number was above 8,000. Most German states had state-owned railway companies, but there were several large private companies as well. One of these private companies, the Rhenish Railway (Rheinische Eisenbahn), built one of the first ever international railway lines. The line connected Cologne to Antwerp in Belgium and was opened in 1843.

=== The first German railways ===
In 1820, Friedrich Harkort founded a consortium with the aim of building a wagonway from the Schlebusch Coal Region (Kohlerevier Schlebusch) to Haspe. The Schlesbusch-Harkort Coal Railway (Schlebusch-Harkorter Kohlenbahn), with a length of one Prussian mile (7½ kilometres), was largely completed by 1828 and was the first railway to operate over such a distance. The haulage of coal on this narrow gauge railway was carried out by horses. On 1 April 1876, steam locomotives took over the work. The railway is now closed and has been dismantled, although parts of the line may still be seen. The tracks and wagons were later used in a roughly similar way in the construction of the Deilthal Railway.

With the laying of iron rails from Essen by the Deilthal Railway Company, founded in 1828, the first proper railway line was built on German soil. According to one description, the tracks of this line consisted of oak sleepers on which so-called Straßbäume (wooden rails), each 3.30 metres long, were laid in pairs and fixed with wooden nails. Iron rails, 40 millimetres thick, were fastened onto the Straßbäumen, again with wooden nails. The track gauge was initially just 82 cm. The line was one Prussian mile (7,532 meters).

On 20 September 1831, the Deilthal Railway was ceremonially opened by Prince William, a son of the Prussian king, Frederick William II, and was to be called from then on the Prince William Railway Company (PWE). Until 1844 it was operated as a wagonway for the transportation of coal, but as early as 1833 passenger wagons were available "for enjoyment". In 1847, the railway was converted to standard gauge and was worked between Steele South and Vohwinkel as a steam-driven railway with the name Steele-Vohwinkel Railway (Steele-Vohwinkler Eisenbahn). The trackbed is used today by S-Bahn line no. 9.

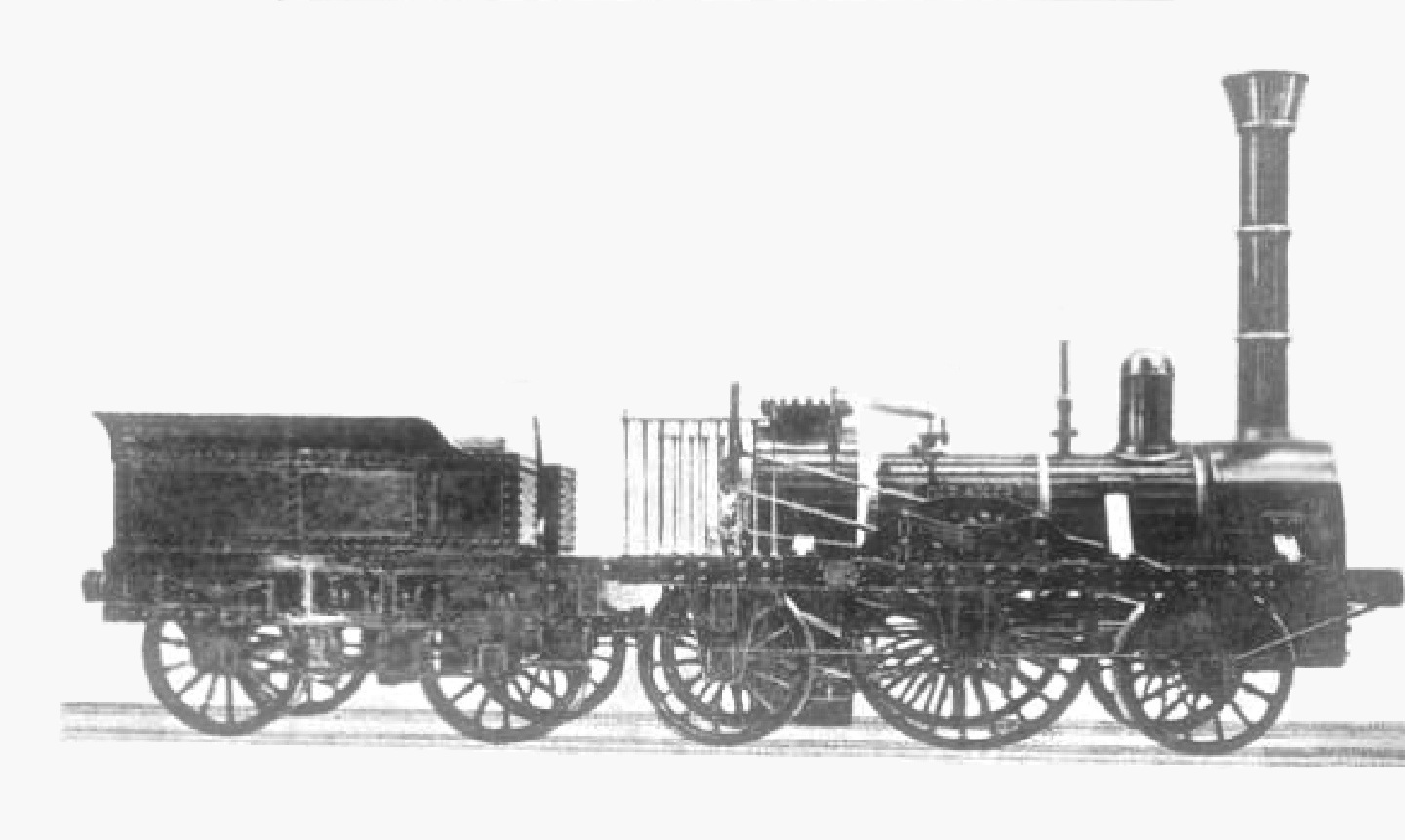
The Adler (built 1835) in an 1850 photograph

The majority and official view, however, is that the Bavarian Ludwig Railway, built in 1835 by the private Ludwig Railway Company in Nuremberg (Ludwigs-Eisenbahn-Gesellschaft in Nürnberg) by engineer Paul Camille von Denis, was the first railway in Germany, because it introduced the new type of steam engine. It was officially opened on 7 December 1835 with a journey from Nuremberg to Fürth after earlier test runs had been carried out with the locomotive Adler, built by Stephenson and Co. in Newcastle upon Tyne.

The Englishman William Wilson drove the locomotive on this first journey and became the first engine driver in Germany. In contemporary publications, this first journey by a steam locomotive was seen as the beginning of a new era. The decision of the Ludwig Railway Company to opt for the English system, including its rail profile and track gauge, flanges, wagons and so on, also had a normative effect because subsequently, the German railways adopted the same standards based on what was clearly a mature system. The development of the German railway network bypassed this line and it was never connected to other railways. Finally, it had to compete with electric trams running between Nuremberg and Fürth. On 31 October 1922, it was closed and used for a tramway.

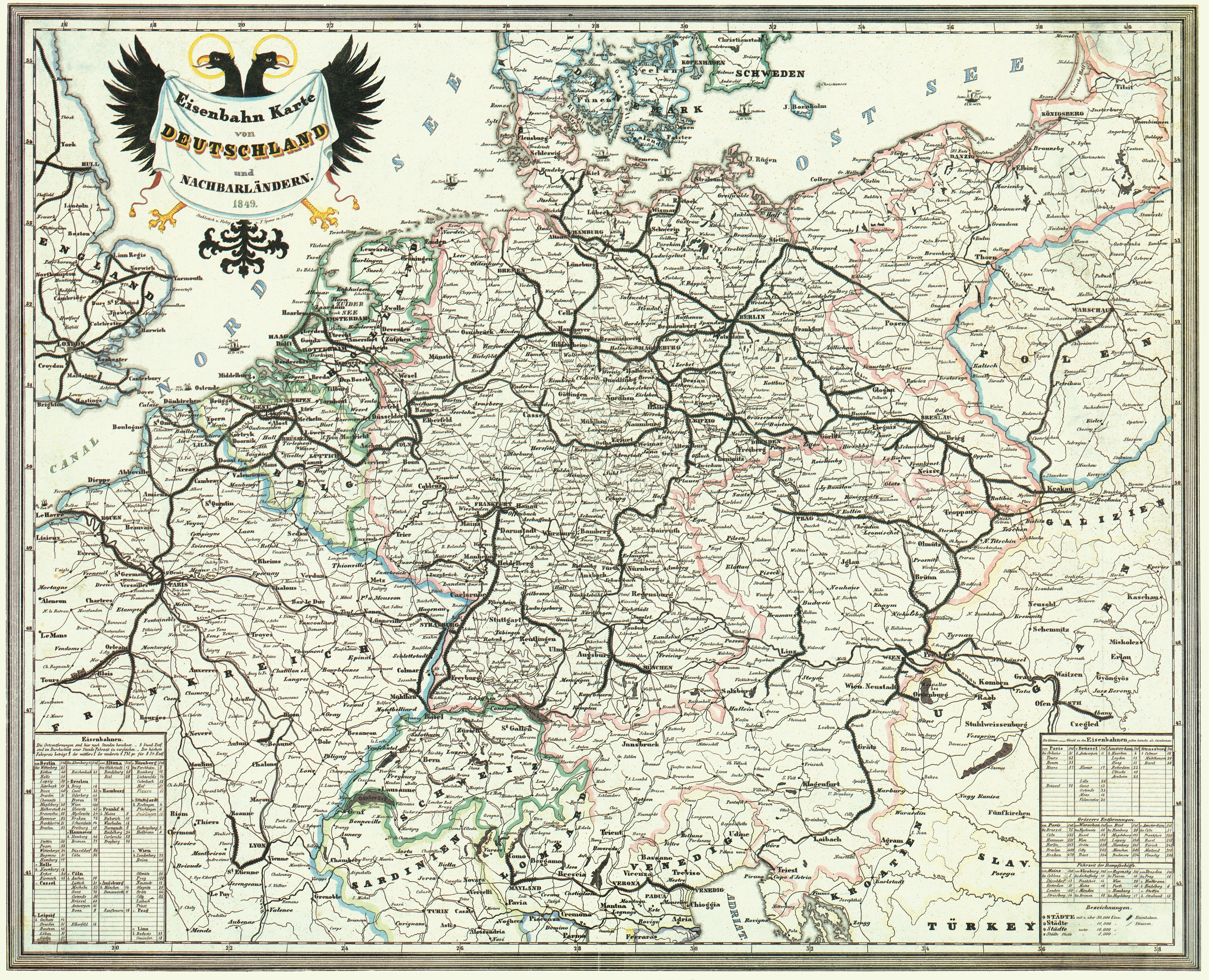
The railway network in 1849

This was followed by the first railway in Prussia, the Berlin-Potsdam Railway: the 11-kilometre-long stretch from Zehlendorf to Potsdam which opened on 22 September 1838; its 12-kilometre extension from Zehlendorf to Berlin was opened on 29 October 1838.

From 1 December 1838, the Duchy of Brunswick State Railway operated between Brunswick and Wolfenbüttel. This was the first railway in Germany to be in state ownership, probably intended to prevent a takeover by Prussia, but it was later sold to Prussia in 1869 due to the financial difficulties which the duchy found itself in.

The Düsseldorf-Elberfeld Railway opened the line between Düsseldorf and Erkrath on 20 December 1838, thus becoming the first steam railway in the Rhineland and the Prussian Rhine Province.

The first railway line in Hesse was the 41.2-kilometre-long Taunus Railway between the free city of Frankfurt and Wiesbaden, the capital of the Duchy of Nassau, which was taken into operation in four stages between 26 September 1839 and 19 May 1840.

=== 1840s ===
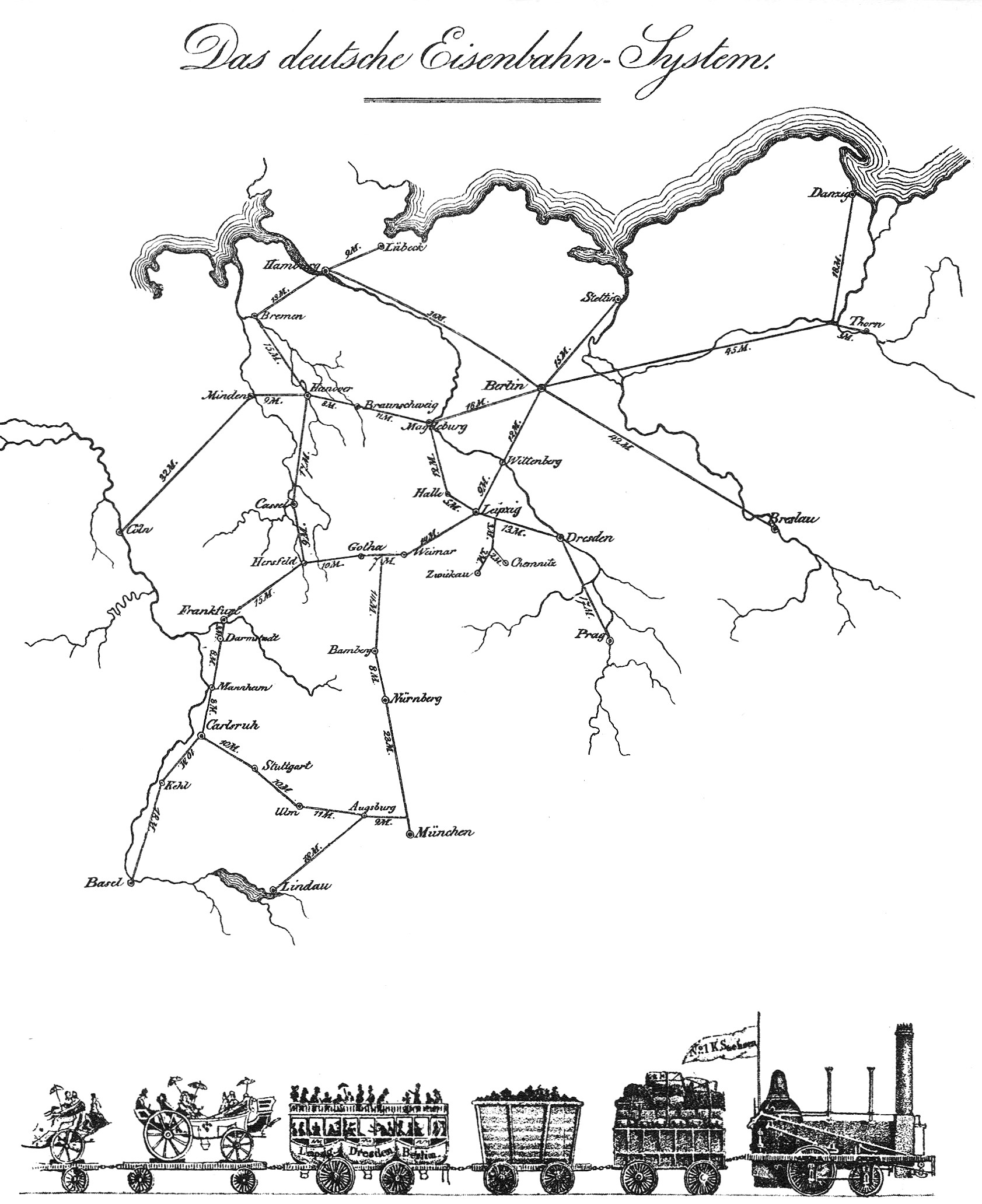
Friedrich List's concept for a German railway net from 1833

The takeoff stage of economic development came with the railroad revolution in the 1840s, which opened up new markets for local products, created a pool of middle managers, increased the demand for engineers, architects and skilled machinists and stimulated investments in coal and iron. Political disunity of three dozen states and a pervasive conservatism made it difficult to build railways in the 1830s. However, by the 1840s, trunk lines did link the major cities; each German state was responsible for the lines within its own borders. Economist Friedrich List summed up the advantages to be derived from the development of the railway system in 1841:

# As a means of national defence, it facilitates the concentration, distribution and direction of the army.

1. It is a means to the improvement of the culture of the nation. It brings talent, knowledge and skill of every kind readily to market.
2. It secures the community against dearth and famine, and against excessive fluctuation in the prices of the necessaries of life.
3. It promotes the spirit of the nation, as it has a tendency to destroy the Philistine spirit arising from isolation and provincial prejudice and vanity. It binds nations by ligaments, and promotes an interchange of food and of commodities, thus making it feel to be a unit. The iron rails become a nerve system, which, on the one hand, strengthens public opinion, and, on the other hand, strengthens the power of the state for police and governmental purposes.

Lacking a technological base at first, the Germans imported their engineering and hardware from Britain, but quickly learned the skills needed to operate and expand the railways. For example, in 1837-39, Thomas Clarke Worsdell (1788–1862), chief coachbuilder of the Liverpool and Manchester Company, came to help engineer the railway linking Leipzig and Dresden. In many cities, the new railway shops were the centres of technological awareness and training, so that by 1850, Germany was self-sufficient in meeting the demands of railroad construction, and the railways were a major impetus for the growth of the new steel industry. Observers found that even as late as 1890, their engineering was inferior to Britain's. However, German unification in 1870 stimulated consolidation, nationalisation into state-owned companies, and further rapid growth. Unlike the situation in France, the goal was support of industrialisation, and so, heavy lines crisscrossed the Ruhr and other industrial districts, and provided good connections to the major ports of Hamburg and Bremen. By 1880, Germany had 9,400 locomotives, pulling 43,000 passengers and 30,000 tons of freight per year per locomotive, and its rail network forged ahead of France.

=== First trunk lines ===
The first section of the Leipzig-Dresden Railway, from Leipzig to Althen, was opened on 24 April 1837, becoming the third German railway to be built. The line was completed through to Dresden on 7 April 1839. With a total route length of 120 km (75 mi), this was also the first German trunk or long-distance railway and the first exclusively steam-powered railway in Germany. The Dresden Leipzig railway station was the first railway station in Dresden, the capital of Saxony, and was the terminus of the Leipzig-Dresden Railway. Its route also included the first German railway tunnel.

On 29 June 1839, the first section of the Magdeburg-Leipzig Railway, from Magdeburg to Schönebeck was opened. After being extended to Halle and Leipzig in 1840 it became the first international main line and had a route length of 116 km (72 mi).

Between 1839 and 1843, the Rhenish Railway was built from Cologne to the border station of Herbesthal, with its connection to Antwerp. The line was opened on 15 October 1843 and was the first railway line that crossed an external border of the German Confederation.

On 12 September 1840, the Grand Duchy of Baden opened a state railway: the route from Mannheim to Heidelberg and the first section of the 285-kilometre-long (177 mi) Baden Main Line from Mannheim to Basel, which reached Freiburg im Breisgau on 1 August 1845, and which was completed in 1855. Unlike all the surrounding railways, Baden used a broad gauge of 1600 mm until 1854/55.

On 12 September 1841, the Berlin-Anhalt Railway Company began working the route from the Anhalter Bahnhof in Berlin to Köthen (Anhalt), where the line met the Berlin-Potsdam-Magdeburg Railway. As a result, Köthen became the first railway hub in Germany.

With the opening of the Berlin-Frankfurt Railway on 31 October 1842 from Berlin's Silesian station to Frankfurt (Oder) the now loosely connected German railway network now had a total length of just under 1,000 km.

On 22 October 1843, the 16-kilometre-long (9.9 mi) Kreuzbahn ("cross railway") was opened from Hanover to Lehrte, the first line operated by the Royal Hanoverian State Railways. Lehrte became an important railway hub, with routes to Berlin, Cologne, Hildesheim and Harburg in front of the gates of Hamburg.

The first section of the Cologne-Minden Railway, from Deutz to Düsseldorf, was opened on 20 December 1845; the second section to Duisburg followed on 9 February 1846. The line was extended the following year, reaching Hamm via Dortmund on 15 May. On 15 October 1847, the entire 263-kilometre-long (163 mi) line to Minden was completed, initially just single-tracked. On the same day the line from Hanover to Minden was opened by the Royal Hanoverian State Railways.

On 1 September 1846, the last section (Frankfurt (Oder) – Bunzlau) of the 330-kilometre-long (210 mi) Lower Silesian-Märkisch Railway was opened, linking the two great cities of Prussia, Berlin and Breslau. At the same time the main line of the Upper Silesian Railway that started in Breslau reached Gleiwitz in October of that year. Within three years the railway network in the German Confederation had more than doubled in length.

Three and a half months later, on 15 December 1846, the Berlin–Hamburg Railway went into service: a 286-kilometre-long (178 mi) diagonal connection between the two largest cities of what became the German Empire.

Likewise in 1846 the Main-Neckar Railway from Frankfurt (Main) to Mannheim and Heidelberg went into service.

=== Central European network ===
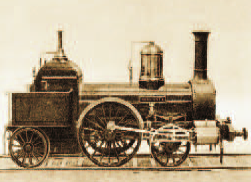
Locomotive of the Cologne-Minden Railway supplied in 1848 by Borsig

In the north the line from Celle to Harburg owned by the Hanoverian State Railway in the Kingdom of Hanover reached Harburg on the River Elbe on 1 May 1847. In autumn of that year continuous east-west links were established:

- On 1 September 1847 the Saxon-Silesian Railway Company connected the railway network Lower Silesia to Central Germany when it opened the Dresden–Gorlitz railway.
- On 15 October 1847 the last section of the Cologne-Minden Railway and the Minden branch of the Hanoverian State Railway were opened simultaneously creating the first through railway link from the Rhine to the Oder via Berlin. The route was more complicated than today however: the link from Brunswick to Magdeburg ran, in July 1843, via Wolfenbüttel, Jerxheim and Oschersleben to Magdeburg. Until the completion of the Buckau Railway Bridge in 1848, traffic from Berlin ended at the station of Magdeburg-Friedrichstadt on the eastern bank of the Elbe. After crossing the Elbe, passengers had to re-board the train at Schleinufer (Elbbahnhof), the terminus of the line from Oschersleben.

Berlin's termini were not linked within the city until 1851, when the Berlin Link Railway entered service.

On 18 October 1847, there was a continuous line from Breslau to Kraków for the first time when the Upper Silesian Railway was linked to the Kraków-Upper Silesian Railway. With the completion of the railway within Breslau on 3 February 1848 that connected its termini, there was now a continuous rail link from the Rhine to the Vistula And with the closure of a short gap between the William Railway in Upper Silesia and the Emperor Ferdinand Northern Railway in Austrian Silesia on 1 September 1848, the first contiguous Central European network was formed, reaching as far as Deutz, right of the Rhine, in the west, Harburg in the north, Warsaw and Kraków in the east and as far as Gloggnitz at the northern foot of the Semmering Pass in the south. Among the northern lines there were still small gaps in Berlin and Hamburg.

In the following year, 1849, a connexion from Berlin to Kassel via Halle (Saale)/Gerstungen was established when the Halle–Bebra railway owned by the Thuringian Railway and the Frederick William Northern Railway in the Electorate of Hesse were completed. The connexion of the southern German states of Baden and Bavaria took somewhat longer:

- Berlin – Frankfurt/Main (Main-Weser Railway, 1852), continuing via Mannheim (Main-Neckar Railway) to Freiburg im Breisgau (Rhine Valley Railway, 1855)
- Berlin – Munich (Ludwig South-North Railway, 1853)

=== European network ===
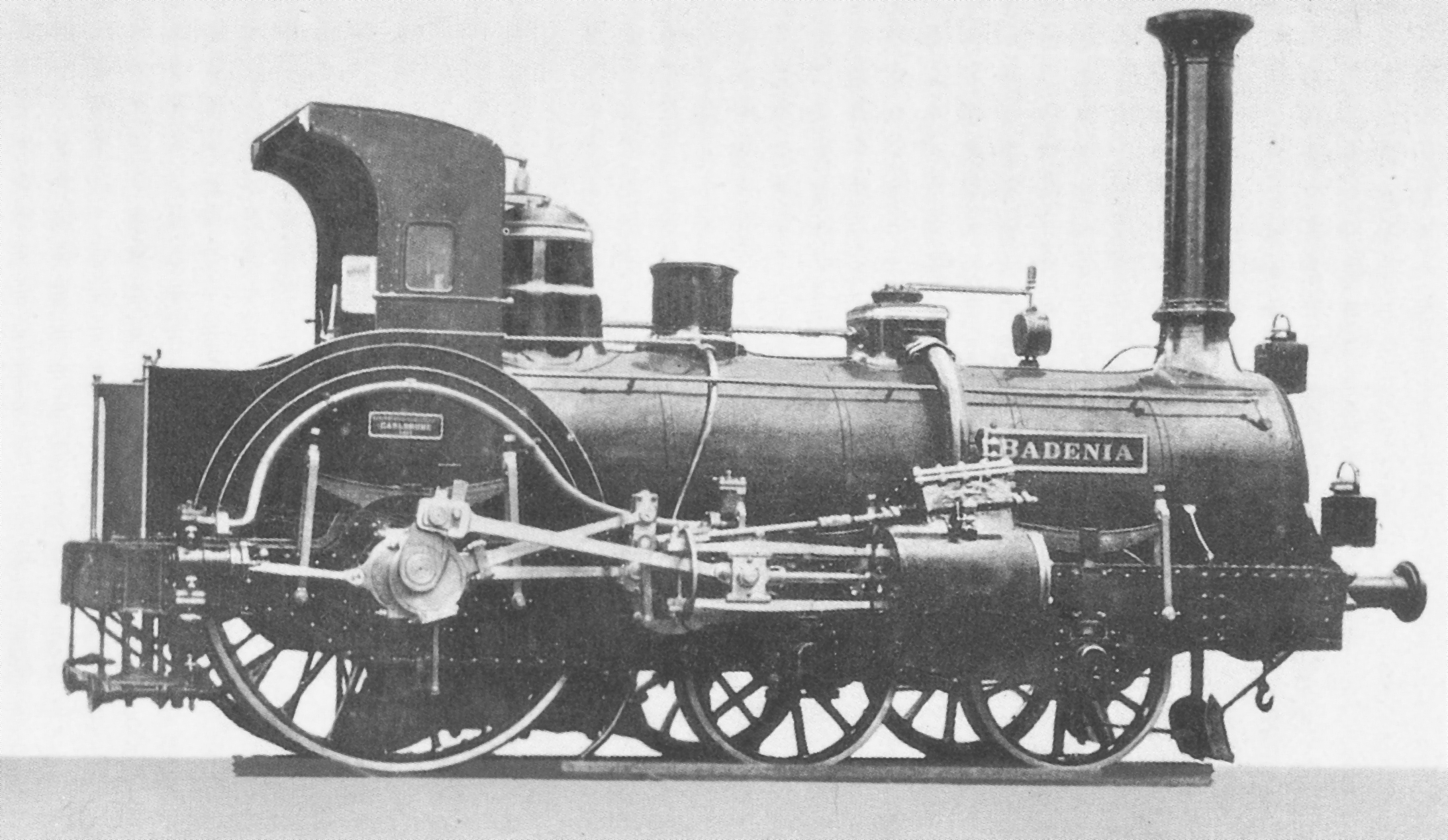
Baden Class IX, built 1854–1863

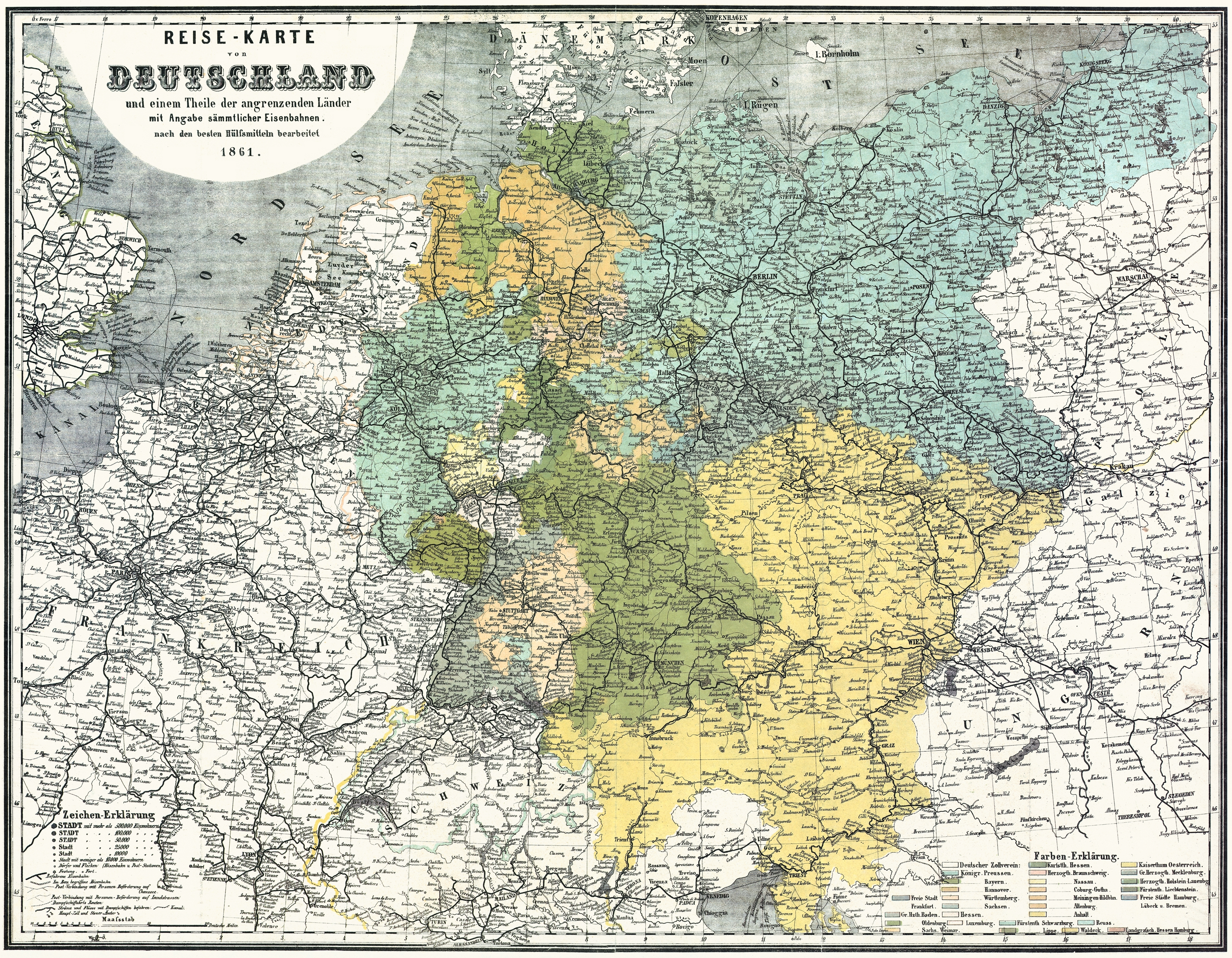
The railway network in 1861

Following the takeover of Cöln-Crefeld Railway at the turn of 1855/56, the Rhenish Railway Company, which was founded to build the line to Belgium, began work on a railway from Cologne upriver along a section of the left bank of the Rhine. This line reached Rolandseck on 1 January 1857, Bingerbrück in 1859, today Bingen Central Station, to where in the same year the main line of the Hessian Ludwig Railway was extended, linking Mainz with Ludwigshafen from 1853.

With the opening of Cologne's Cathedral Bridge on 3 October 1859 the west European rail network, consisting of the French and Belgian networks and German lines west of the Rhine, were joined to the central European network that, meanwhile, had been extended to Flensburg, Königsberg (Prussia) (now Kaliningrad), Rzeszów in Galicia, Hungary beyond the Theiß, and to Triest on the Mediterranean.

In 1860 the Prussian Eastern Railway was extended to the Russian border at Eydtkuhnen in German East Prussia (today Chernyshevskoye in Kaliningrad Oblast). With the opening of the Russian branch line from Vilnius (German: Wilna) on the Saint Petersburg–Warsaw Railway to the border near Virbalis (German: Wirballen, Russian: Вержболово and Polish: Wierzbałowo), the first junction between the European standard gauge and the Russian broad gauge networks was established between the stations Eydtkuhnen and Virbalis.

=== State railway ambitions ===
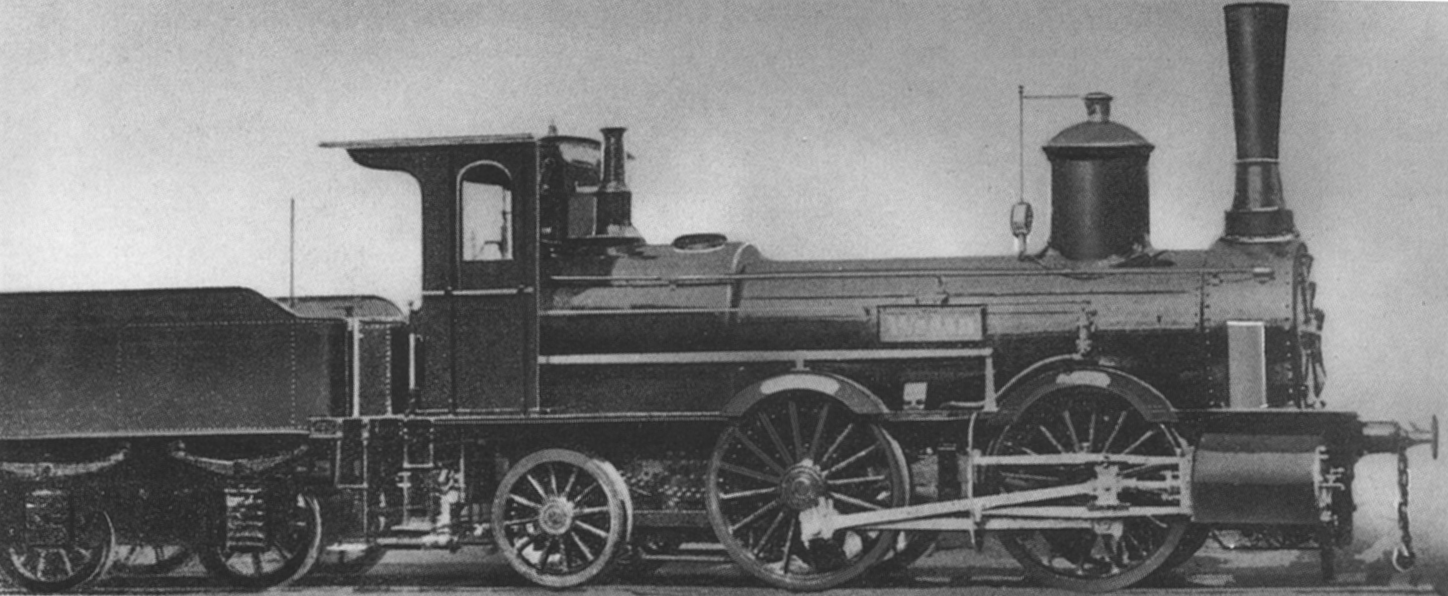
Locomotive of the private Mecklenburg Railway, built 1866

The governing bodies of the German states had differing attitudes to the railway. Some left the initiative to private operators, others attempted to establish a state-owned railway, especially in the southern German monarchies of the Grand Duchy of Baden, Kingdom of Bavaria and Duchy of Württemberg. Prussia, on the other hand, initially encouraged private railways, but later took several railway companies into state ownership that had run into financial difficulties, such as the Berg-Mark Railway Company.

Following the unification of Germany in 1871, attitudes changed in Prussia; Otto von Bismarck, in particular, pressed for the development of a state railway system. The railway was seen as having great military-strategic importance. Numerous ways were tried in order to create a common, German state railway. This was finally achieved during the inter-war years (1918–1939): in accordance with the Weimar Constitution the Deutsche Reichsbahn was founded. Prior to that, there were the following early and significant approaches to the creation of national "state railways" (Staatsbahnen):

- In Baden an "Act Concerning the Construction of a Railway from Mannheim to the Swiss Border near Basel" was passed on 29 March 1838 and announced on 2 April 1838. Several other acts followed that dealt with the financing, forced acquisitions, the establishment of a railway division and operating regulations.
- In Württemberg King William I announced on 18 April 1843 the "Act Affecting the Construction of Railways", according to which railways were to "be transferred to the administration of the state or built at the cost of the state". Apart from the state railways the construction of other branch lines was left to private concerns. However, relatively few private railways were built in Württemberg.
- In Bavaria the private Munich-Augsburg Railway Company began railway construction in 1839 and opened its route from Munich to Augsburg on 4 October 1840. The period of the Bavarian state railways began with the nationalisation of the Munich-Augsburg line in 1844. The Royal Bavarian State Railways began by building the Ludwig South-North Railway from 1844 to 1853; a line 548 kilometres long between Hof and Lindau.
- The Frankfurt National Assembly advised on the constitution of a German Empire as a federal state in 1848/1849. In doing so, they considered nationalising the railways and placing their management under the imperial government in order to strengthen the power of the empire.

== The Länderbahn era (1871–1920) ==
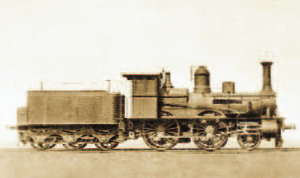
Borsig engine for Berlin–Hamburg Railway, built in 1873

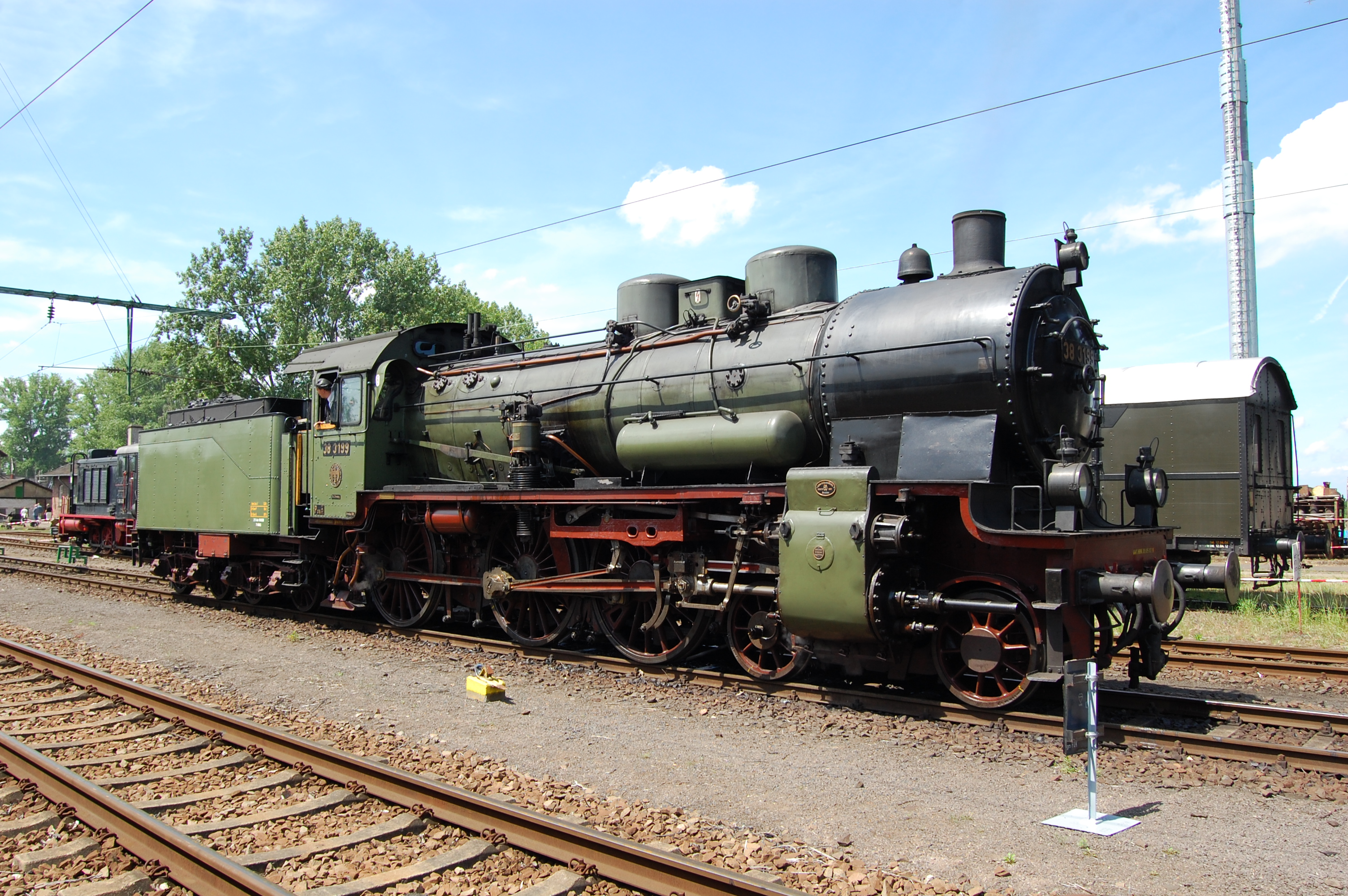
Prussian state railways' P8, built 1906–1923

German unification in 1871 stimulated consolidation, nationalization into state-owned companies, and further rapid growth. Unlike the situation in France, the goal was support of industrialization, and so heavy lines crisscrossed the Ruhr and other industrial districts, and provided good connections to the major ports of Hamburg and Bremen. By 1880, Germany had 9,400 locomotives each annually pulling 43,000 passengers or 30,000 tons of freight, and forged ahead of France.

Prussia nationalized its railways in an effort both to lower rates on freight service and to equalize those rates among shippers. Instead of lowering rates as far as possible, the government ran the railways as a profitmaking endeavor, and the railway profits became a major source of revenue for the state. The nationalization of the railways slowed the economic development of Prussia because the state favoured the relatively backward agricultural areas in its railway building. Moreover, the railway surpluses substituted for the development of an adequate tax system.

=== Nebenbahn ===
As the main line network consolidated, railways were driven into the hinterland, serving local needs and commuter traffic. This was the age of the branch line or Nebenbahn (plural: -en), also variously called the Sekundärbahn ("secondary line"), Vizinalbahn ("neighbourhood line") or Lokalbahn ("local line") depending on local laws and usage.

=== Important lines ===
Several states operated their own railways, collectively called the Länderbahnen (state railways). Those created up to 1871 were the:

- Various Prussian state railway companies, including the Königlich Preußische und Großherzoglich Hessische Staatseisenbahn (K.P.u.G.H.St.E.)
- Royal Bavarian State Railways (Königlich Bayerische Staatseisenbahn or K.Bay.Sts.B.)
- Royal Saxon State Railways (Königlich Sächsische Staatseisenbahnen or K.Sächs.Sts.E.B.)
- Royal Württemberg State Railways (Königlich Württembergische Staatseisenbahn or K.W.St.E.)
- Grand Duchy of Baden State Railways (Großherzoglich Badische Staatseisenbahn or G.Bad.St.E., 1840–1920)
- Grand Duchy of Mecklenburg Friedrich-Franz Railway (Großherzoglich Mecklenburgische Friedrich-Franz-Eisenbahn or M.F.F.E.)
- Grand Duchy of Oldenburg State Railways (Großherzoglich Oldenburgische Staatseisenbahn or G.O.E., 1867–1920)
- Royal Hanoverian State Railways (Königlich Hannöversche Staatseisenbahnen), from 1866 part of the Prussian state railways
- Duchy of Brunswick State Railway (Herzoglich Braunschweigische Staatseisenbahn), from 1870 part of the Prussian state railways
- Nassau State Railway (Nassauische Staatsbahn), from 1866 part of the Prussian state railways
- Anhalt Leopold Railway (Anhaltische Leopoldsbahn), from 1882 part of the Prussian state railways
- Bebra-Hanau Railway (Bebra-Hanauer Eisenbahn), a Kurhesse state railway, from 1866 part of the Prussian state railways
- Imperial Railways in Alsace-Lorraine (Reichseisenbahn Elsaß-Lothringen), founded in 1871 and handed to France at the end of the First World War

The Palatinate Railway (Pfalzbahn), formed in 1870, was a private railway company that was nationalised in 1909 and became part of the K.Bay.Sts.B..

In order to enable the free exchange of goods wagons between the different state railway administrations, the German State Railway Wagon Association (Deutscher Staatsbahnwagenverband or DSV) was formed in 1909. The standard wagons that resulted are often referred to as 'DSV wagons'.

At the end of the First World War, most of the state railways lost their 'royal' or 'grand duchy' titles as the nobility abdicated. Huge reparations of locomotives and rolling stock followed. Epoch I ended with the merger of the seven remaining state railways in the newly created Deutsche Reichsbahn in 1920.

== Deutsche Reichsbahn (1920–1945) ==
In 1920, following World War I, the Länderbahnen were united to form the Deutsche Reichsbahn. In accordance with the "Dawes Plan", on 30 August 1924 the state railways were legally merged to form the Deutsche Reichsbahn-Gesellschaft (DRG, German State Railway Company), a private company, which was required to pay reparations of about 660 million Marks annually.

The more than 200 steam locomotive types of the different German Länderbahnen were grouped into Baureihen (BR) (roughly translates as classes) of engines with similar wheel notations, like the "BR 18" which covered all 4-6-2 Pacific express train engines.

New construction standards since 1925 resulted in Einheitsloks (DRG Standard design), using similar mechanical parts to lower costs, which allowed fast and reliable manufacturing, repair and operating. New DRG Standard design locomotives were mostly large passenger and freight locomotives, like the Class 01 or Class 41. In 1928 the Rheingold Express started riding between Hook of Holland and Basel. On 11 May 1936 the streamlined steam locomotive 05 002 established the first railway speed world record above 200 km/h: 200.4 km/h, between Hamburg and Berlin. This record was beaten by Mallard in 1938 at a speed of 203 km/h.

The standardisation of goods wagons under the German State Railway Wagon Association, that had produced the Verbandsbauart ('Association design') wagons, continued as new designs using interchangeable components were introduced from about 1927. These were the Austauschbauart ('interchangeable design') wagons. The 1930s saw the introduction of welded construction and solid wheels replacing spoked wheels on new goods wagons. As the Second World War loomed, production was geared towards the war effort. The focus was on fewer types but greater numbers of so-called Kriegsbauart or wartime designs for the transportation of large quantities of tanks, vehicles, troops and supplies.

The grave lack of passenger coaches resulting from World War I reparations led to the design and production of all-steel, standard passenger coaches in the 1920s and early 1930s. These four-wheeled, branch line coaches, nicknamed Donnerbüchsen, lasted into the 1970s and can still be seen today on museum lines.

During the Second World War, austere versions of the standard locomotives were produced to speed up construction times and minimize the use of imported materials. These were the so-called war locomotives (Kriegslokomotiven and Übergangskriegslokomotiven). In the absence of a good highway network and trucks, Germany relied heavily on the railways, supplemented by slower river and canal transport for bulk goods. The rail yards were the main targets of the "transportation strategy" of the British and American strategic bombing campaign of 1944–45, and resulted in massive destruction of the system.

== Transition period (1945–1949) ==
After World War II, Germany (and the DRG) was divided into 4 zones: American, British, French and Soviet. The first three eventually combined to form the Federal Republic of Germany (the West) and the Russian zone became the German Democratic Republic (the East). German territories beyond the Oder were ceded to Poland except for the northern part of East Prussia, which was ceded to the Soviet Union in 1945.

== Deutsche Bundesbahn (1949–1994) ==
From 1949, the new governments assumed authority for railway operations. The DRG's (or DR's) successors were named Deutsche Bundesbahn (DB, German Federal Railways) in West Germany, and Deutsche Reichsbahn (DR, German State Railways) in East Germany kept the old name to hold tracking rights in western Berlin.

Unlike the DRG, which was a corporation, both the DB and the DR were federal state institutions, directly controlled by their respective transportation ministries. Railway service between East and West was restricted; there were around five well-controlled and secure checkpoints between West and East Germany, and about the same number between East Germany and West Berlin. Four transit routes existed between West Germany and West Berlin; citizens of West Berlin and West Germany were able to use these without too much harassment by the East German authorities.

The DB started in 1968 with changing the locomotive and passenger car serial numbers to the UIC norm. In 1970 the DR followed. The DB started experimenting with the Intercity trains in a new livery (bright orange).

In 1988 the prototype InterCityExperimental (ICE V) set a new German railway speed record of 406.9 km/h (254.3 miles/h) on the new high speed line between Fulda and Würzburg. In 1991 the new high speed lines Hannover-Fulda-Würzburg (280 km/h) and Mannheim-Stuttgart (250 km/h) were opened for service including the new ICE 1 train sets.

== Deutsche Reichsbahn (DR) (1949–1994) ==
Deutsche Reichsbahn (1949–1993)

== Deutsche Bahn (1994–present) ==
In 1989, the Berlin Wall fell. Train frequency rapidly increased on the existing East/West corridors; closed links which had formerly crossed the border were re-opened. On 3 October 1990, Germany was reunified; however, this was not immediately the case with the railways. Administrative and organisational problems led to the decision to completely re-organise and reconnect Germany's railways. The so-called Bahnreform (Railway Reform) came into effect on 1 January 1994, when the State railways Deutsche Bundesbahn and Deutsche Reichsbahn were formally reunited to form the current German Railway Corporation (Deutsche Bahn).

The German railways had long been protected from competition from intercity buses on journeys over 50 km. However, in January 2013, this protection was removed, leading to a significant shift from rail to bus for long journeys.

== See also ==
- History of rail transport
- Rail transport in Germany
- History of the railway in Württemberg
- German steam locomotive classification
- Narrow gauge railways in Germany
