= Duchy of Brunswick State Railway =

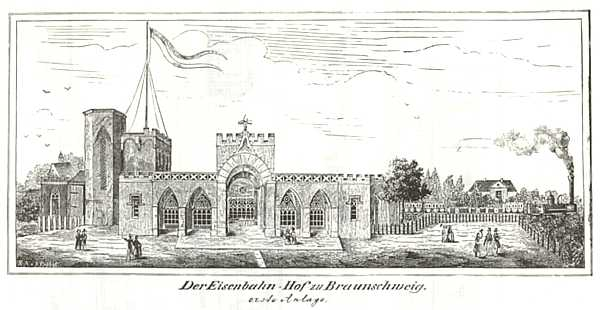
Brunswick railway station, opened in 1838

The Duchy of Brunswick State Railway (Herzoglich Braunschweigische Staatseisenbahn) was the first state railway in Germany. The first section of its Brunswick–Bad Harzburg railway line between Brunswick and Wolfenbüttel opened on 1 December 1838.

== Opening ==
The construction of the line was mainly the work of the entrepreneur Philipp August von Amsberg, privy councillor to Duke William of Brunswick. Amsberg investigated the transportation links from the land-locked Duchy of Brunswick to the Hanse cities of Hamburg, Bremen and Lübeck and recognised that the transportation of wood and mining products from the duchy's estates in the Harz mountain range to the maritime harbours was not competitive. Conversely products from the seaboard harbours tended to be transported on the Elbe river to Magdeburg in the Prussian Province of Saxony but not to Brunswick. In 1824 he proposed, in a memorandum, a plan to build railway links from Brunswick through the Kingdom of Hanover to the cities of Hamburg and Bremen. These ideas were publicised in 1832 but foundered on German sectionalism (Kleinstaaterei).

In 1835 Amsberg again looked into the plan to build an eastern railway from Brunswick via Helmstedt to Magdeburg. This plan was given up in favour of a later route via Oschersleben in order to form a junction there to the Prussian Magdeburg–Halberstadt line. In the same year, the first steam-hauled railway line in Germany, the Bavarian Ludwig Railway, opened between Nuremberg and Fürth. At the instigation of Amsberg, the Brunswick state ministry finally made the decision to build a railway line from Brunswick southwards to Wolfenbüttel and the exclave of Bad Harzburg (until 1892: Neustadt) – the Brunswick–Bad Harzburg railway – and thereby pre-empt the intent of the Hanoverian government to build an eastern railway via Halberstadt to Magdeburg, which would bypass Brunswick to the south.

On 1 August 1837 construction began on the first section from Brunswick in southern direction and on 30 November 1838 the route was inaugurated by Duke William riding on a train to Wolfenbüttel hauled by a Blenkinsop locomotive. Opened to traffic the next day, it was the first German state railway and the fourth railway line to be built in the German Confederation. On 31 October 1841 the line to Bad Harzburg via Vienenburg was completed. The Vienenburg station opened in 1840 on Hanover territory is today the oldest railway station in Germany which is still in use. The ascent from here to the rim of the Harz range was initially worked by horses, but by 1843 steam haulage had been introduced on this section too, using three locomotives built in England. These engines were the first six-coupled locomotives in Germany.

In 1850, Philipp-August von Amsberg became head of the Duchy's Railway and Postal Division in Brunswick.

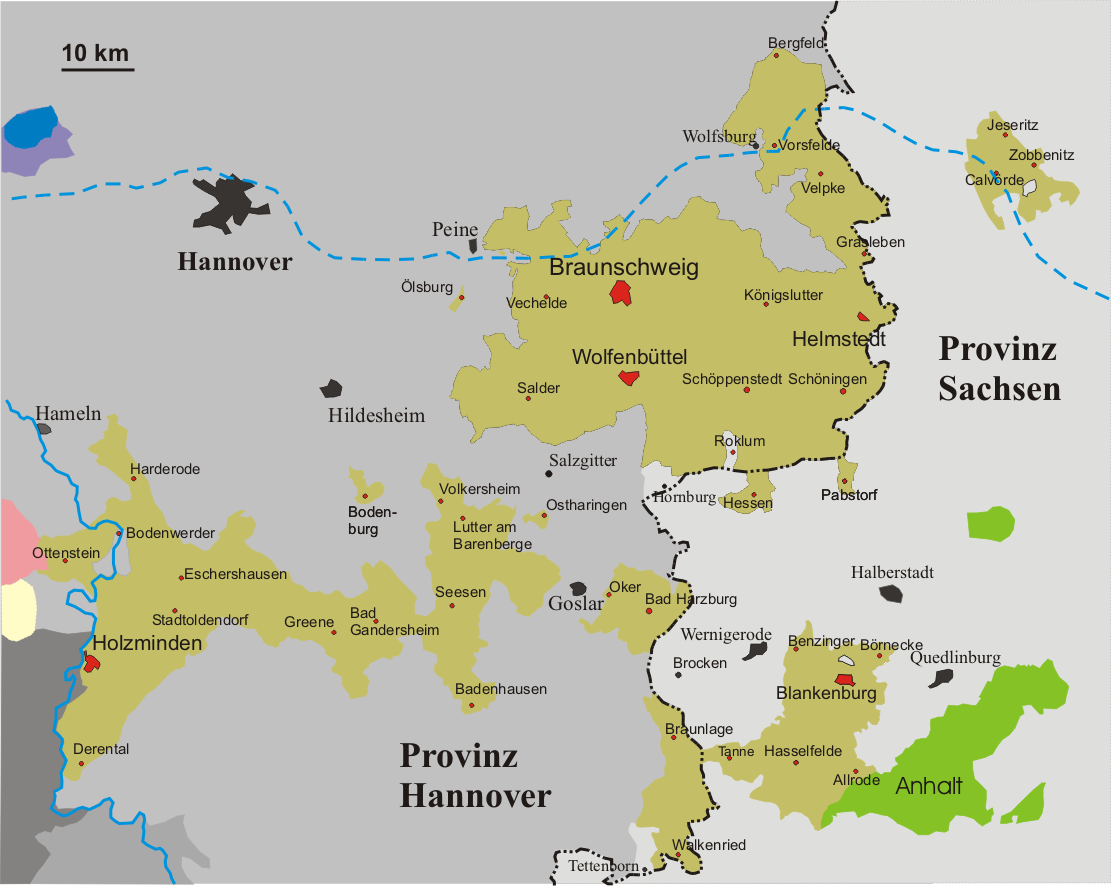
Brunswick territories between Hanover (from 1866: Province of Hanover) and the Prussian Province of Saxony

== Development of the network ==
- On 10 July 1843 the eastern branch Wolfenbüttel–Oschersleben via Jerxheim and Schöningen was opened with the junction to the Prussian railways operated by the Magdeburg-Halberstadt Railway Company and further connection to Berlin and Leipzig as well as to the Brunswick exclave of Blankenburg.
- The western Brunswick-Peine line was opened on 19 May 1844 with a junction to the Royal Hanoverian State Railways after an agreement had been reached finally with reluctant Ernest Augustus, King of Hanover.
- The Brunswick Southern Railway branch from Börßum to the Hanoverian Southern Railway at Kreiensen was built from 1853 and opened in 1856.
- In 1858 the Helmstedt brown coal district was connected to Jerxheim by the Jerxheim–Helmstedt railway.
- Another branch from Vienenburg to Goslar opened in 1866; as this line ran entirely through Hanover territory it had been built by the Hanoverian State Railway, but was at first operated by the Brunswick State Railway.
- When the southwestern link from Kreiensen to Holzminden and Höxter link to the lines of the Royal Westphalian Railway Company opened in October 1865, a through route was established via Altenbeken to the Rhine-Westphalian industrial region.
- With the completion of the Jerxheim–Börßum railway, a long-distance through route was established in 1868 between Magdeburg and the Ruhr area bypassing both Hanover and Brunswick, which was of particular interest to Prussia. The major east–west thoroughfare was superseded by the Berlin–Lehrte railway (Lehrter Bahn) opened in 1871.

== Takeover by the state of Prussia ==
After the 1866 annexation of Hanover by Prussia, the Brunswick lines were entirely surrounded by the Prussian state railways. In 1869 Amsberg entered into the sale of the Brunswick State Railway to Prussia with a heavy heart. The Duchy of Brunswick had amassed heavy debts at that time, that had arisen mainly due to the expansion of the railway.

In March 1870, with effect from 1 January 1869, the Brunswick State Railways were transferred to a private railway concern, the Brunswick Railway Company. Amsberg did not survive to see the Prussian state buy up the shares in this company between 1879 and 1882, operate it under the Prussian state railways and subordinate it in 1886 to the royal railway division (Eisenbahndirektion) of Magdeburg.

== Literature ==
- Born, Erhard (ed.), Pioniere des Eisenbahnwesens, Darmstadt: Carl Röhrig Verlag.
- Neubauer, Jürgen / Salewsky, Dieter (1988): 150 Jahre 1. Deutsche Staatseisenbahn Braunschweig-Wolfenbüttel. Braunschweig: Joh. Heinr. Meyer Verlag. ISBN 3-926701-05-6.

== See also ==
- Duchy of Brunswick
- Brunswick State Railway Company
- History of rail transport in Germany
- Prussian state railways
