= Oschersleben (Bode) station =

Railway station in Oschersleben, Germany

Oschersleben (Bode)
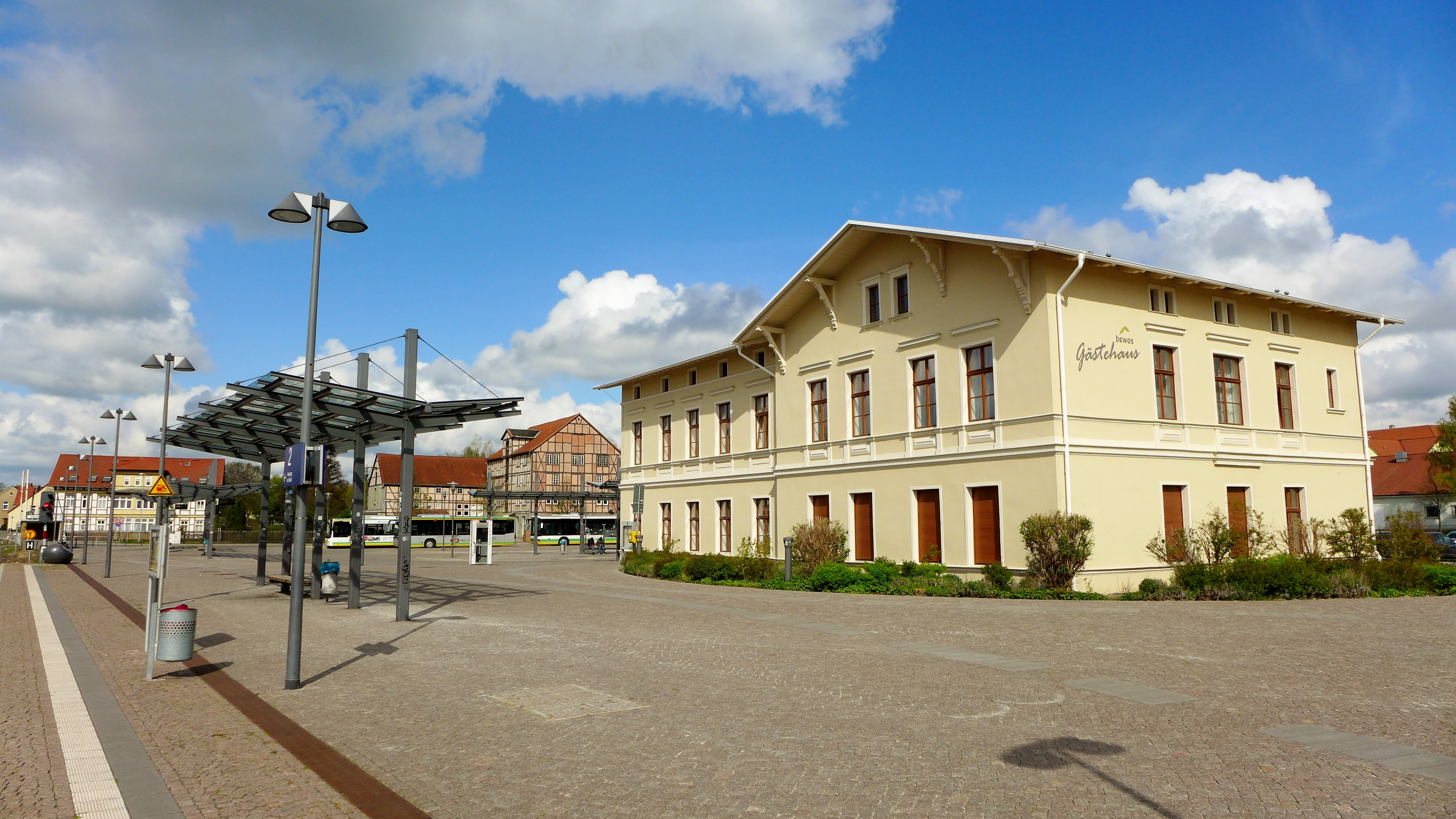
- 2016

General information
- Location: Am Bahnhof 3; 39387 Oschersleben (Bode), Saxony-Anhalt; Germany
- Coordinates: 52°01′50″N 11°13′38″E
- Owner: DB Netz
- Operator: DB Station&Service
- Lines: Magdeburg–Thale (km 38.2); Wolfenbüttel–Oschersleben (km 65.7); Oscherleben–Schöningen (km 0.0)
- Platforms: 2
- Train operators: Transdev Sachsen-Anhalt

Construction
- Accessible: Yes

Other information
- Station code: 4784
- DS100 code: LO
- IBNR: 8010266
- Category: 6
- Fare zone: marego: 360
- Website: www.bahnhof.de

History
- Opened: 15 July 1843

Services
Preceding station	Abellio Rail Mitteldeutschland	Following station
Nienhagen towards Thale Hbf	RE 11	Magdeburg-Buckau towards Magdeburg Hbf
Nienhagen towards Goslar	RE 21	Magdeburg-Buckau towards Magdeburg Hbf
Nienhagen towards Blankenburg (Harz)	RE 31	Magdeburg-Buckau towards Magdeburg Hbf
Terminus	RB 43	Hadmersleben towards Magdeburg Hbf
Location

Oschersleben (Bode) station (German: Bahnhof Oschersleben (Bode)) is a railway station in the town of Oschersleben (Bode), Saxony-Anhalt, Germany. The station lies on the Magdeburg–Thale railway.

Oschersleben station is the most important station on the line to Halberstadt. It was built together with the construction of the line to Brunswick. The southern side of the V-shaped station serves trains to Halberstadt and the northern side formerly served trains to Jerxheim and Brunswick and the trains of the Oschersleben-Schöningen Railway Company. The station building is located between the tracks and originally contained the customs and passport control facilities for travelling between the Duchy of Brunswick and the Kingdom of Prussia. After the division of Germany after 1945, the route to Jerxheim was closed and in consequence the northern side of the station lost most of its purpose. Until 1991, a few daily passenger trains shuttled from there to the border town of Gunsleben. In recent years a few trains from Magdeburg terminated on the north side of the station. Meanwhile, the tracks and the large reception hall on the north side are virtually unused.

== Rail services ==
In the 2016 timetable, Oschersleben (Bode) station was served by the following services:

Line	Route		Interval
RE 11	Magdeburg Hbf – Oschersleben (Bode) – Nienhagen – Halberstadt –	Wegeleben – Quedlinburg – Thale	60 min
RE 21	Magdeburg Hbf – Oschersleben (Bode) – Nienhagen – Halberstadt –	Wernigerode – Ilsenburg – Vienenburg – Goslar	120 min
RE 31	Magdeburg Hbf – Oschersleben (Bode) – Nienhagen – Halberstadt –	Langenstein – Blankenburg (Harz)	120 min
RB 43	Oschersleben (Bode) – Blumenberg – Langenweddingen – Osterweddingen – Dodendorf – Magdeburg-Buckau – Magdeburg Hbf		60 min (Mon–Fri); 120 min (Sat–Sun)
