= Wolfenbüttel–Oschersleben railway =

Railway line in Germany

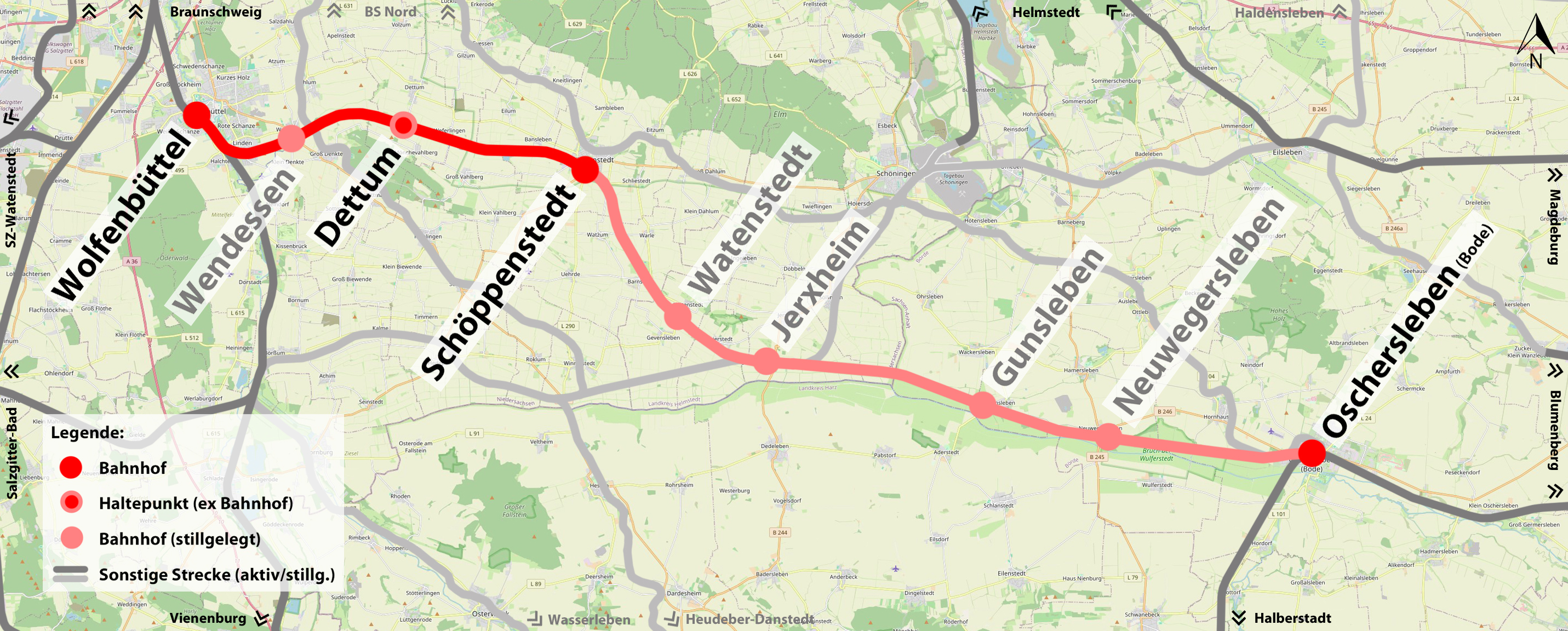

Overview
- Line number: 1942
- Locale: Saxony-Anhalt, Lower Saxony, Germany

Technical
- Line length: 53.1 km (33.0 mi)
- Track gauge: 1,435 mm (4 ft 8 1/2 in) standard gauge

The Wolfenbüttel–Oschersleben railway runs through the border area of the German states of Saxony-Anhalt and Lower Saxony. It was opened in 1843 and was one of the oldest long-distance railways in Germany. All traffic from Berlin and Central Germany ran over it to Hanover and the Ruhr area until the beginning of the 1870s. Afterwards it lost importance, but remained an important line for East-West traffic.

After 1945, the line between Jerxheim and Gunsleben was interrupted by the inner German border. The section of line remaining in East Germany between Oschersleben and Gunsleben was downgraded to a branch line, but traffic ended on it in 1992. Only the section from Wolfenbüttel to Schöppenstedt has remained in operation since 2007.

== History ==
In the course of the development of the first railways in Germany, there were a number of projects for connections between the seaports and southern and eastern Germany. The Duchy of Brunswick attached great importance to the fact that its area might be affected by a through railway. A proposed east-west connection via Halle (Saale) and Kassel or another possible line from Magdeburg to Lüneburg would not have passed through the Duchy. A treaty signed on 10 April 1841 between the Kingdom of Prussia, the Kingdom of Hanover and the Duchy of Brunswick dealt with the construction of a rail link from Magdeburg via Oschersleben, Brunswick and Hanover to Minden.

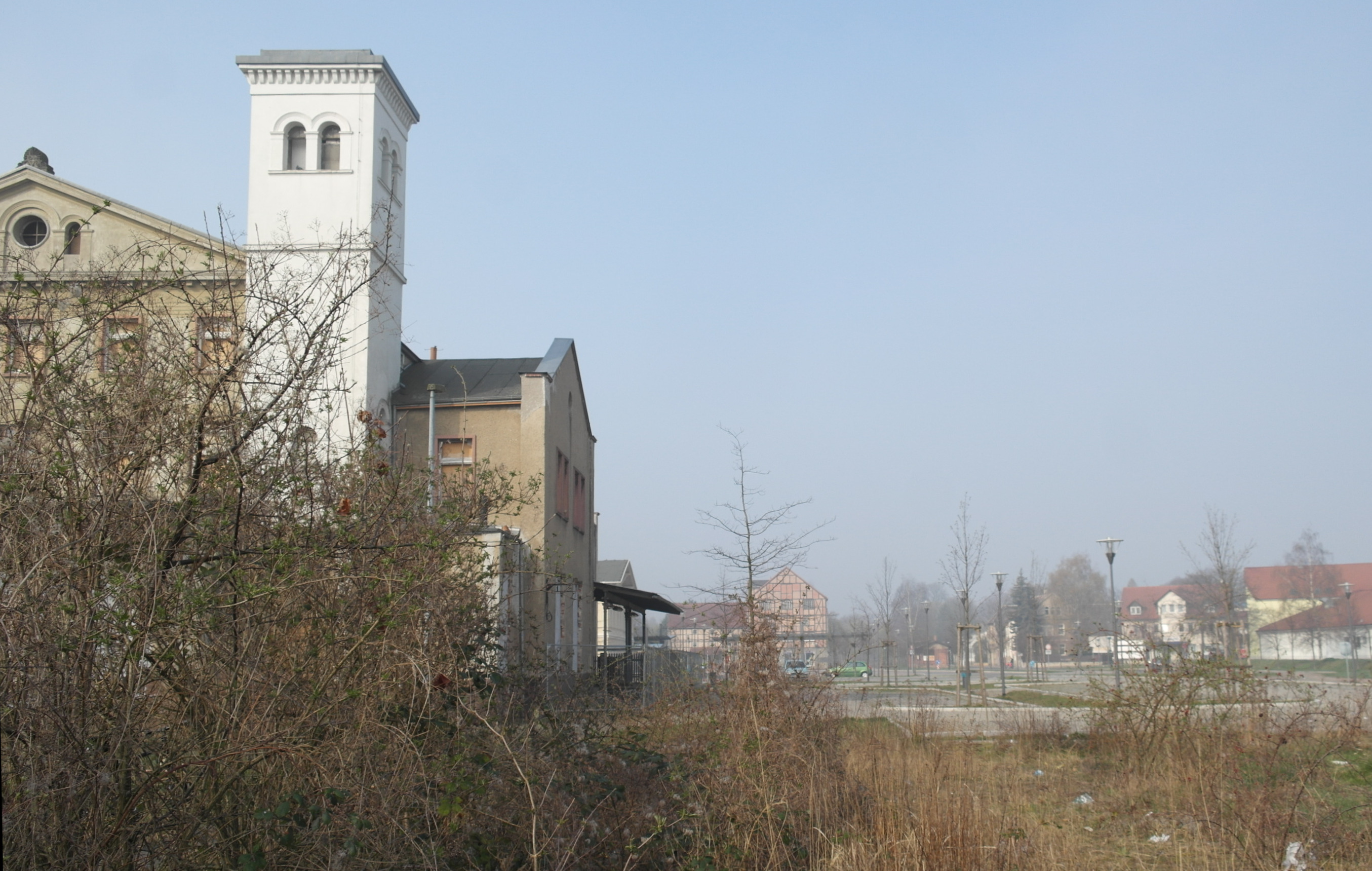
The Brunswick side of Oschersleben (Bode) station

Even before the conclusion of the treaty, the Duchy of Brunswick commenced preparatory work for the construction of the line. Between Brunswick and Wolfenbüttel, the existing Brunswick–Bad Harzburg railway was double tracked and the facilities of the Brunswick station were significantly expanded.

The Duchy of Brunswick State Railway opened the line on 16 July 1843. A continuous connection between Brunswick and Magdeburg was created with connections via Köthen to Leipzig, Dresden and Berlin. Brunswick was connected to Hanover in 1844. Thus, a continuous connection had developed from Hanover to Berlin, although initially trains had to be changed at the transition points between the railway companies.

Railway stations were built in Schöppenstedt, at Kybitzdamm (now Kiebitzdamm) near Jerxheim, in Wegersleben (now Neuwegersleben) and Oschersleben. Oschersleben (Bode) station became a joint station with the Magdeburg–Halberstadt Railway Company (Magdeburg-Halberstädter Eisenbahngesellschaft), when the Magdeburg–Thale railway opened on 15 July 1843.

With the completion of the Hanover–Minden railway on 16 October 1847, there was a continuous connection from Cologne to Berlin via Minden, Hanover, Brunswick, Oschersleben, Magdeburg, Köthen and Wittenberg. The travel time between Berlin and Cologne was shortened from 22 hours in 1847 to 16 hours in 1851 after the completion of the direct Berlin–Magdeburg railway in 1848 and further work to accelerate operations. The first direct coach ran between Berlin and Cologne in 1852.

In 1853, the track between Jerxheim and Oschersleben was doubled, and a year later the second track also went into operation between Schöppenstedt and Jerxheim.

The Jerxheim–Börßum railway, which provided a connection to the Brunswick Southern Railway to Kreiensen, was opened in 1868, which was particularly useful for traffic towards Göttingen, Kassel and Frankfurt am Main.

After the opening of the Berlin–Lehrte railway in 1871 and the direct Brunswick–Magdeburg line (via Helmstedt) in 1872, it was mainly used for freight.

=== Loss of significance after 1871 ===
The opening of the Berlin–Lehrte railway in 1871 and the Brunswick–Magdeburg railway (via Helmstedt) in 1872 provided two significantly shorter connections between Berlin and Hanover. The line via Oschersleben lost importance. It remained important for freight traffic and long-distance trains ran between Frankfurt and Berlin over the section between Jerxheim and Oschersleben. Until 1920, some trains used this line but some also used the connection from Jerxheim via Schöningen and the line to Eilsleben built in 1871.

The Braunschweigische Eisenbahndirektion (Brunswick Railway Division) was dissolved in 1882. The line became part of the Königlichen Eisenbahndirektion Magdeburg (Royal Railway Division of Magdeburg). A branch line from Jerxheim to Nienhagen near Halberstadt was opened in 1890.

A rail connection from Gunsleben station to the sugar factory in Aderstedt was approved in 1922. The 2.8-kilometre long track was built a year later. Another siding ran from Neuwegersleben to the Vereinigte Friederike brown coal mine in Hamersleben.

=== After the division of Germany ===
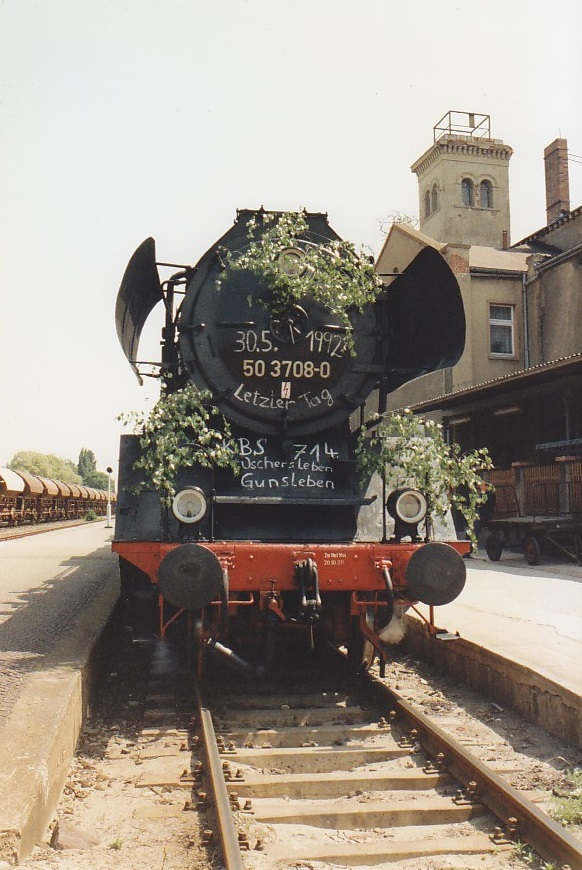
Locomotive 50 3708-0 hauls the last train from Oschersleben to Gunsleben on 30 May 1992

After the division of Germany into occupation zones, the section between Jerxheim and Gunsleben was cut. The last scheduled train ran on 30 June 1945. One of the two tracks between Oschersleben and Gunsleben was dismantled for reparations to the Soviet Union. The tracks were completely dismantled between Gunsleben and the border and they disappeared between the border and Jerxheim by 1948. The sections between Gunsleben and Oschersleben and later between Wolfenbüttel and Schöppenstedt were downgraded to branch lines.

The operations between Oschersleben and Gunsleben continued as a branch line until the early 1990s with four to six local trains per day and direction. In 1959, material previously used for freight infrastructure was used for the construction of the Berlin outer ring and it was replaced by lighter rails. The tracks were renewed during track rehabilitation in 1976, but, as alkali-containing concrete sleepers were used, conditions deteriorated after a few years. This section, including the siding to Aderstedt, which is now dismantled, was closed "for technical reasons" on 30 May 1992. As late as 1993, buses were offered as a rail replacement services. No maintenance took place any more.

After the division of Germany, the Jerxheim–Börßum railway also lost its importance and traffic on it was abandoned. Until 2007, the section from Wolfenbüttel to Jerxheim was used by regional trains on the Brunswick–Wolfenbüttel–Schöppenstedt–Jerxheim–Schöningen–Helmstedt route. Because of a planned expansion of mining, the line was cut north of Schöningen. Because of the low number of passengers, the line was closed rather than relocated. Traffic was also discontinued between Schöppenstedt, Jerxheim and Schöningen.

The section between Schöningen and Jerxheim was closed by the Federal Railway Authority (Eisenbahn-Bundesamt) on 21 May 2009.

=== Remaining operation between Wolfenbüttel and Schöppenstedt ===
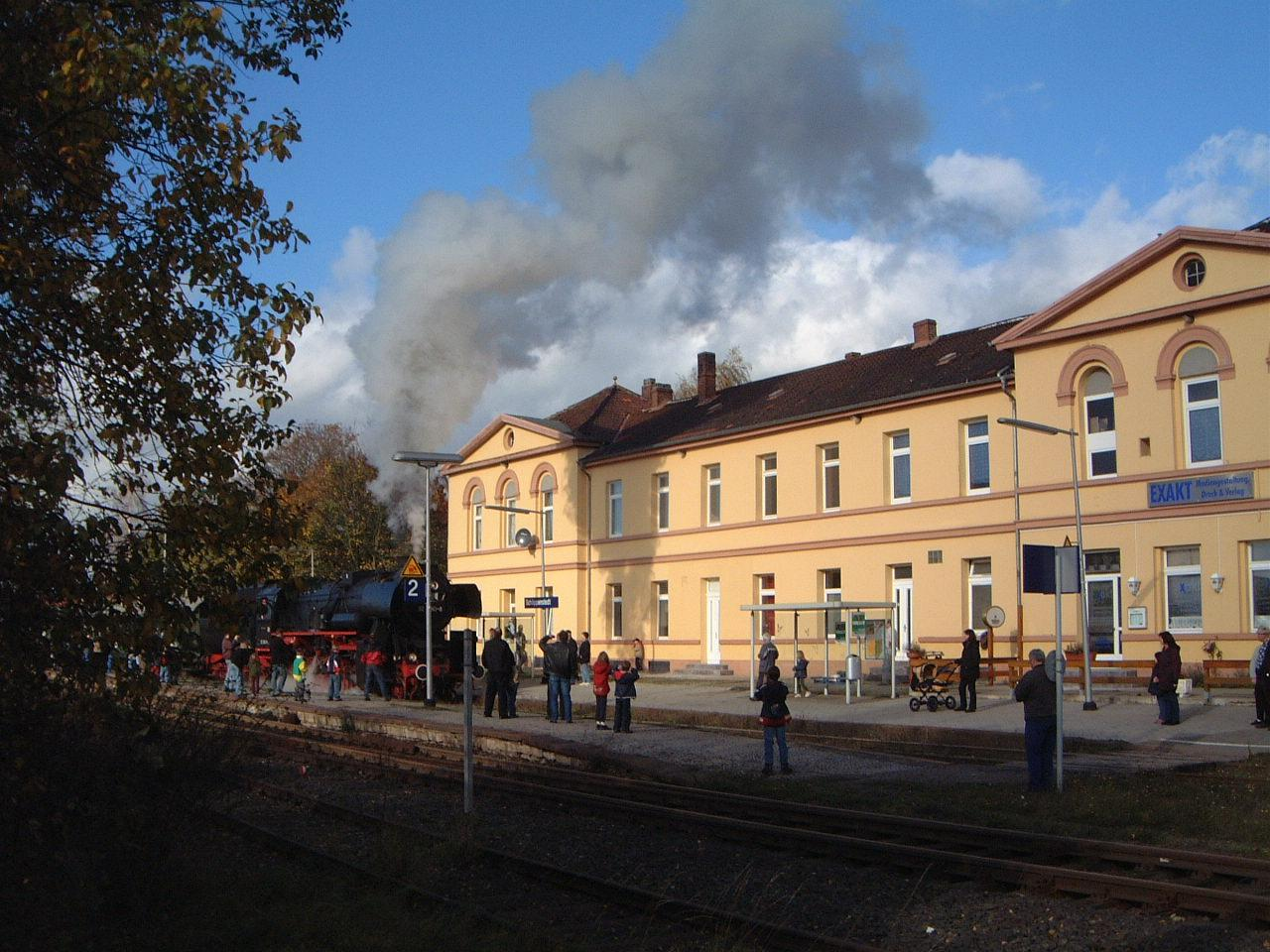
Special service in Schöppenstedt station

Since 2007, only the Wolfenbüttel–Schöppenstedt section has been used for passenger transport. It is served by the RB 45 service (Brunswick–Schöppenstedt) with stops in Wolfenbüttel and Dettum. As part of the Europe-wide tender for the Lower Saxony southeast diesel network, DB Regio was awarded the contract for the RB 45 service from December 2014 for 15 years. The company uses modernised LINT 41 sets, which replaced Class 628 sets. With the start of operations, some improvements in the timetable were implemented as part of the Regionalbahnkonzept 2014+ (Regional Railway Concept 2014+). Since then, the line has been operating on Sundays and operating hours have been extended from Mondays to Fridays with trains running hourly between 6 am and about 9 pm and every two hours Saturdays and Sundays. The journey takes about 28–29 minutes.

At Schöppenstedt station there is connection to regional bus route 370 to Schöningen and Helmstedt. The places on the disused line are served by bus routes 372 (Schöppenstedt–Watenstedt–Jerxheim–Söllingen) and 397 (Watenstedt–Jerxheim–Söllingen–Schöningen–Büddenstedt–Helmstedt).

There were plans to integrate the line into the network of the planned RegioStadtBahn Braunschweig (Brunswick Regional Stadtbahn). For this purpose, some stations would have been rebuilt and the number of trains increased. The trains would have been operated by diesel hybrid light rail vehicles, which would have run over Stadtbahn (light rail) tracks through the centre of Brunswick. In the local transport plan an extension was planned to Schöningen in a later stage of implementation. The entire project was originally intended to be realised by 2014. The project failed in 2010 because the cost of the concept was no longer acceptable due to significantly increased rolling stock procurement costs. In order to increase the attractiveness of the lines even without the implementation of the Stadtbahn project, the Zweckverband Großraum Braunschweig (Greater Brunswick municipal association, ZGB) sought the realisation of the Regional Railway Concept 2014+.

Schöppenstedt station was rebuilt in 2017 as a Haltepunkt (halt). For this purpose, all sets of points and tracks were dismantled and a new, modern platform was built in the middle of loop created by a new track. The track ends at a buffer just before the former level crossing over the B 82. The track infrastructure immediately behind the level crossing was dismantled and the area near the crossing was surfaced.

The operating procedure is to be switched to direct traffic control (Zugleitbetrieb nach Ril 436, ZLB).

The ZGB has agreed to establish a combined platform for bus and train at the Schöppenstedt terminus, shortening transfer times.

The reactivation of the halt at Wendessen was proposed by the ZGB in the Regional Railway Concept 2014+. Currently, the economic feasibility of the project is being analysed.
