= Jerxheim–Helmstedt railway =

Railway line in Germany

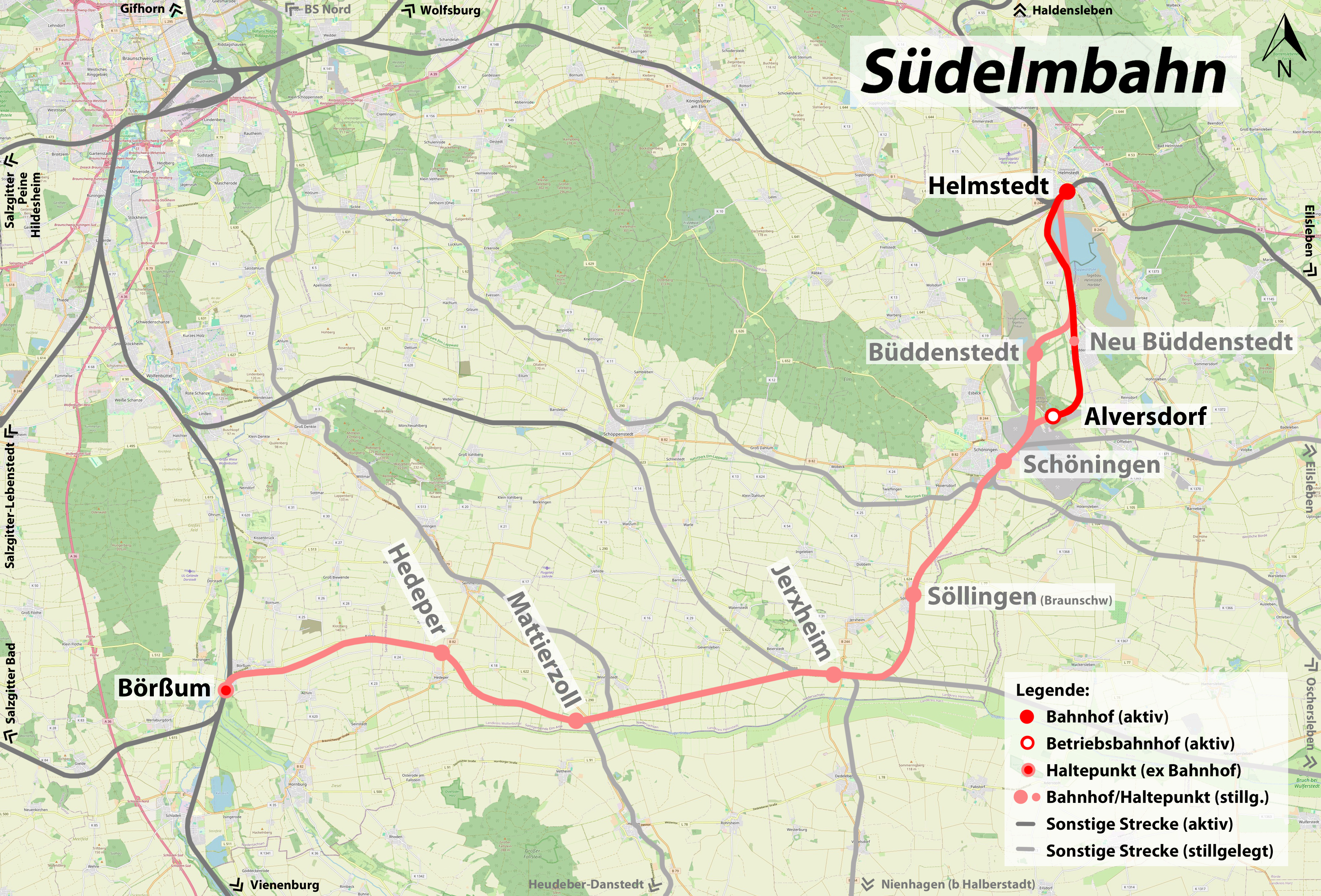

Overview
- Line number: 1940
- Locale: Lower Saxony, Germany

Service
- Route number: ex 312 (2007)

Technical
- Line length: 22.3 km (13.9 mi)
- Track gauge: 1,435 mm (4 ft 8 1/2 in) standard gauge

The Jerxheim–Helmstedt railway is a 22 km-long railway line in the south-east of the German state of Lower Saxony that was opened in 1858. It opened up the area south of the Elm hills. Until 8 December 2007, there were passenger services on the route from Brunswick via Wolfenbüttel, Schöppenstedt, Jerxheim and Schöningen to Helmstedt, which was last marketed as the Südelmbahn. The section from Helmstedt to Alversdorf freight yard has since been operated as a connecting line to a facility of the Energy from Waste (EEW) company, formerly half owned by E.ON.

== History ==
The first state-owned railway in the German Confederation was the line from Brunswick to Wolfenbüttel opened by the Duchy of Brunswick on 1 December 1838. It connected the two most important towns in the then Duchy of Brunswick.

The Wolfenbüttel–Oschersleben railway, running via Jerxheim, was opened on 16 July 1843. Until the opening of the Berlin–Lehrte railway in 1871, this was part of the shortest connection between Hanover and Berlin.

A branch line was built from Jerxheim via Schöningen to Helmstedt, which opened on 20 July 1858. This was the only railway connection to Helmstedt until 1872. In that year, the Brunswick–Magdeburg railway was opened through Helmstedt with a branch from Eilsleben to Schöningen. While this line, like the Jerxheim–Helmstedt line, still had mainly local significance, some express trains ran between Schöningen and Jerxheim. A connection to Frankfurt and the southern Ruhr area existed via the Jerxheim–Börßum railway opened in 1868 and the Brunswick Southern Railway to Kreiensen. The Jerxheim-Schöningen section was double-track. In freight traffic, it was particularly important for the lignite mines and sugar factories of the region.

Later secondary lines were added such as the Jerxheim–Nienhagen (1890) and the Brunswick–Schöningen (1902) railways.

With the division of Germany, the inner-German border cut all east and south-east branching lines; only the Helmstedt–Magdeburg line was preserved. After the closing of the Jerxheim–Börßum line and several branch lines at the end of the 1970s, the Wolfenbüttel–Jerxheim–Helmstedt line was the only line remaining between the border and the Elm hills. It was preserved despite moderate traffic for industrial policy reasons; the open cast lignite mines in the Helmstedt lignite mining district and the Buschhaus Power Station were connected to it.

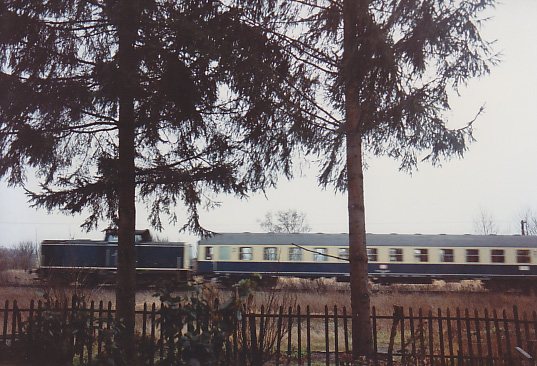
In February 1993, a local train leaves Jerxheim station towards Helmstedt.

Until December 2006, the regional trains on the Brunswick–Schöningen–Helmstedt line ran every two hours from Mondays to Saturdays with additional trains in the peak hour. Then the service on the Schöppenstedt–Helmstedt section was reduced to six train pairs and finally closed at the timetable change in December 2007.

== Closure of the Schöppenstedt–Helmstedt line ==
The relocation of the railway line to make room for the expansion of the opencast mines was considered by the Brunswick Region to be too expensive. Instead, the closure of the track was approved. Traffic between Schöppenstedt and Schoningen was also abandoned in December of 2007. The reason for this was the low passenger numbers, which were just over 200 per day on this section. It was intended that the saved "regionalisation funds" (Regionalisierungsmittel) would be used for new light rail vehicles and an improved level of service to Schöppenstedt to be operated by the Regionalstadtbahn von Braunschweig (Brunswick Regional Stadtbahn).

The section through the planned mining area between the branch junction Alversdorf and Schöningen was shut down by the Federal Railway Authority (Eisenbahn-Bundesamt) on 15 November 2008; the Jerxheim–Schöningen section followed on 21 May 2009 and the Helmstedt–Alversdorf section on 26 April 2010, this section remains open for freight as a siding to the e.On company.

In a rating of 73 candidates in Lower Saxony for possible reactivation, the line had already been eliminated in the second stage and listed for "no further investigation". In February 2014, the association meeting of the ZGB debated a possible subsidy for the Schöppenstedt–Schöningen section. The decision was made to have the estimated annual costs of at least €140,000 checked by an expertand and then to decide whether the route should be subsidised or closed.

By 2009, parts of the line between Helmstedt and Schöningen had already been dismantled to allow the expansion of the opencast mine. In Schöningen both platform tracks are still present, the station building is empty and the associated buildings are abandoned. The section from Helmstedt towards Schöningen is operated in freight traffic until shortly before the former Alversdorf. North of this, a siding branches off to the Buschhaus power station.
