= Jerxheim–Börßum railway =

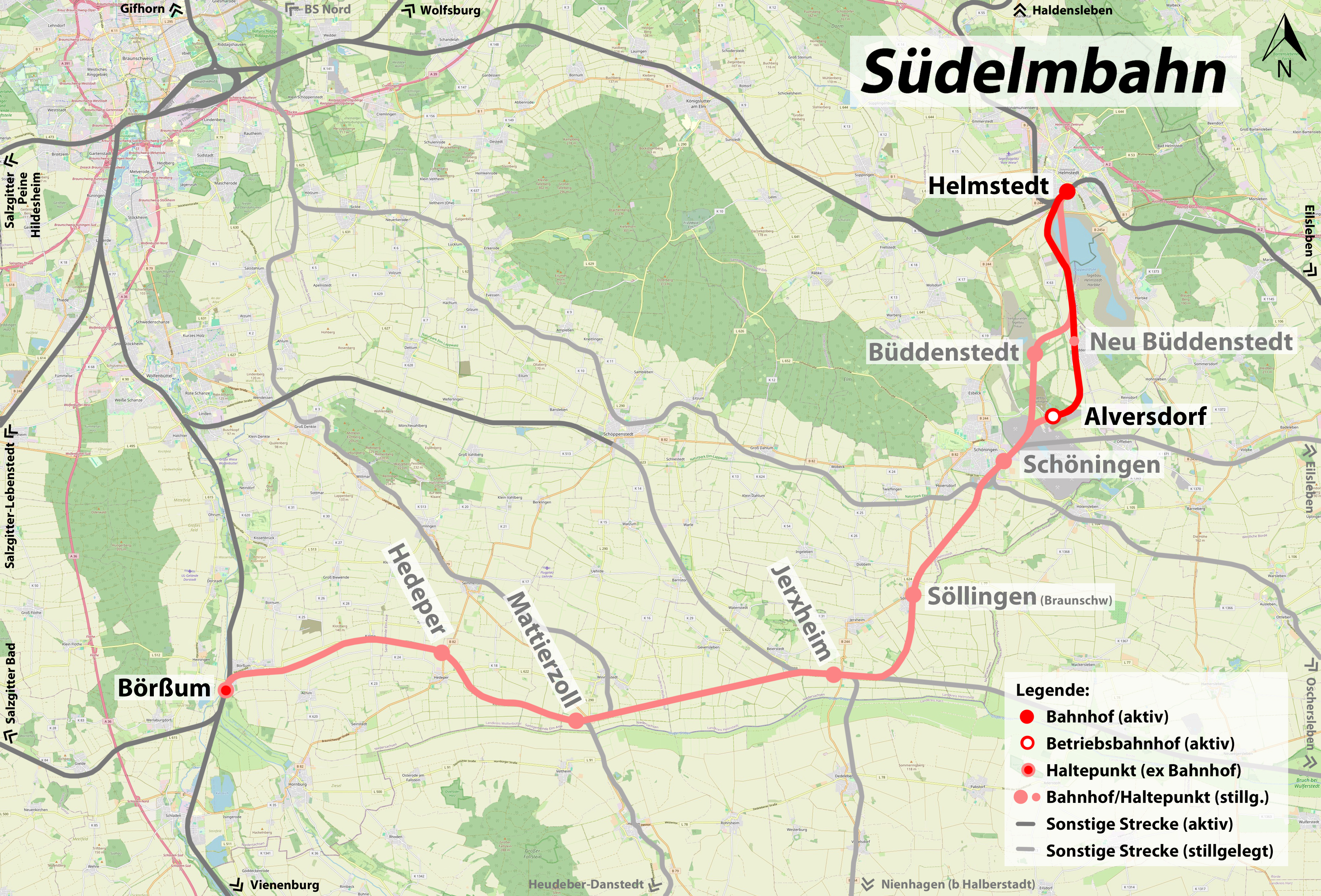

Overview
- Line number: 1940
- Locale: Lower Saxony, Germany

Service
- Route number: last: 236

Technical
- Line length: 23.2 km (14.4 mi)
- Track gauge: 1,435 mm (4 ft 8 1/2 in) standard gauge

The Jerxheim–Börßum railway was a 23 kilometre-long mainline railway in the southeast of the German state of Lower Saxony. It connected the Brunswick Southern Railway (German: Braunschweigische Südbahn) from Börßum to Kreiensen with railways from Magdeburg via Schöningen (Wolfenbüttel–Helmstedt railway) and Oschersleben (Oschersleben–Jerxheim railway) and was until 1945 a route for freight from Berlin and Magdeburg, both to Kassel and Frankfurt and to the Ruhr area.

The line was opened on 1 May 1868. It was used not only by freight trains, but also by fast passenger trains from Berlin to the southwest. After the Inner German border interrupted the connecting lines east of Jerxheim, it was used for three decades for regional traffic. On 1 January 1976 passenger services were closed along with freight traffic between Mattierzoll and Jerxheim. On 28 May 1988 freight traffic between Börßum and Mattierzoll was closed. The track is completely dismantled.
