= Magdeburg–Thale railway =

Railway in Germany

Magdeburg−Thale railway
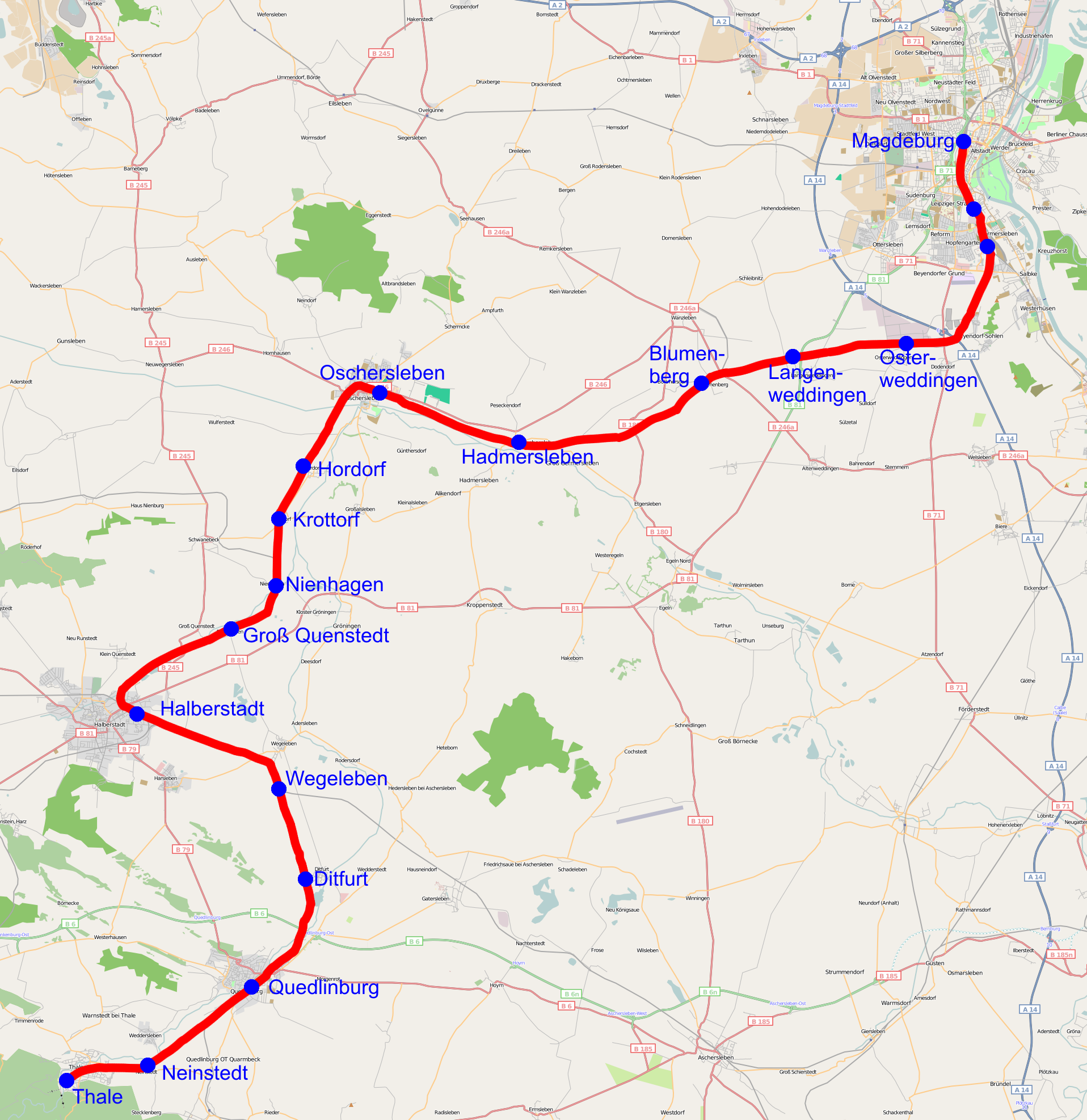

Overview
- Owner: DB Netz
- Line number: 6404 (Magdeburg–Halberstadt); 6344 (Halberstadt–Wegeleben); 6405 (Wegeleben–Thale)
- Locale: Saxony-Anhalt, Germany

Service
- Route number: 315
- Operator(s): HarzElbeExpress

Technical
- Line length: 86.8 km (53.9 mi)
- Number of tracks: 2: Magdeburg–Magdeburg-Buckau; Hadmersleben crossover–Oschersleben; Hordorf crossover–Groß Quenstedt crossover; Halberstadt–Wegeleben
- Track gauge: 1,435 mm (4 ft 8 1/2 in) standard gauge
- Operating speed: 100 km/h (62.1 mph) (maximum)

The Magdeburg–Thale railway is a predominantly single-track, non-electrified main line railway that connects Thale, in the northern Harz, with Magdeburg, the capital of Saxony-Anhalt. Its eastern section between Magdeburg and Halberstadt was opened in 1843 and it is one of the oldest railways in Germany.

== History ==
The Magdeburg-Halberstadt Railway Company (German: Magdeburg-Halberstädter Eisenbahngesellschaft, MHE) opened the Magdeburg–Halberstadt line on 15 July 1843. The extension from Halberstadt to Thale was opened in 1862.

Its original terminus in Magdeburg was at the Elbbahnhof (Elbe station) on the Schleinufer, which had been built by the Magdeburg-Leipzig Railway Company (Magdeburg-Leipziger Eisenbahn-Gesellschaft). The Magdeburg Centralbahnhof (central station, called the Hauptbahnhof since 1895) was not built until the 1870s.

The Magdeburg–Oschersleben section also served long-distance traffic until the division of Germany. A pair of express trains (Durchgangszug) on the Frankfurt–Kreiensen–Berlin route and an Aachen–Berlin service ran on the section in 1929/30. In the same period a pair of long-distance trains used Fernschnellzug on the Basel–Berlin used the line.

In 1967, the Langenweddingen rail disaster occurred on the line, the worst in the history of East Germany. The accident involved a bi-level train hitting a tanker truck at a level crossing, resulting in an explosion that killed 94 people, many of them children on their way to a summer camp in the Harz mountains.

In the 1970s, four pairs of trains per day ran on the Magdeburg–Halberstadt section to or from Berlin, with some coaches to or from Thale. On 29 October 1988, the last scheduled steam-hauled train operated by East Germany railways ran between Thale and Halberstadt.

In 1992, trains operated every two hours between Halberstadt, Berlin and Frankfurt (Oder) with trains stopping at all stations between Magdeburg and Thale; some additional services operated in busy periods. In 1995 long-distance services between Magdeburg and Halberstadt were stopped completely and were replaced by Regional-Express services, operating hourly.

A collision between the Harz-Elbe Express and a freight train on the line on 29 January 2011 killed 10 people and injured 23.

The halts of Hordorf, Krottorf and Groß Quenstedt have not been served since the timetable change on 9 December 2012.

== Route ==
The track is not electrified, except for the short section between Magdeburg Hauptbahnhof and Magdeburg-Buckau. It has duplicated sections from Hadmersleben to shortly before Oschersleben and between Krottorf and Groß Quenstedt. The section between Halberstadt and Wegeleben is also duplicated, as part of the upgrading of the Halle–Halberstadt railway for tilting train operations. The rest of the line is single track.

== Stations ==
=== Magdeburg Hauptbahnhof ===
Magdeburg's main railway station was opened in 1873.

=== Oschersleben ===
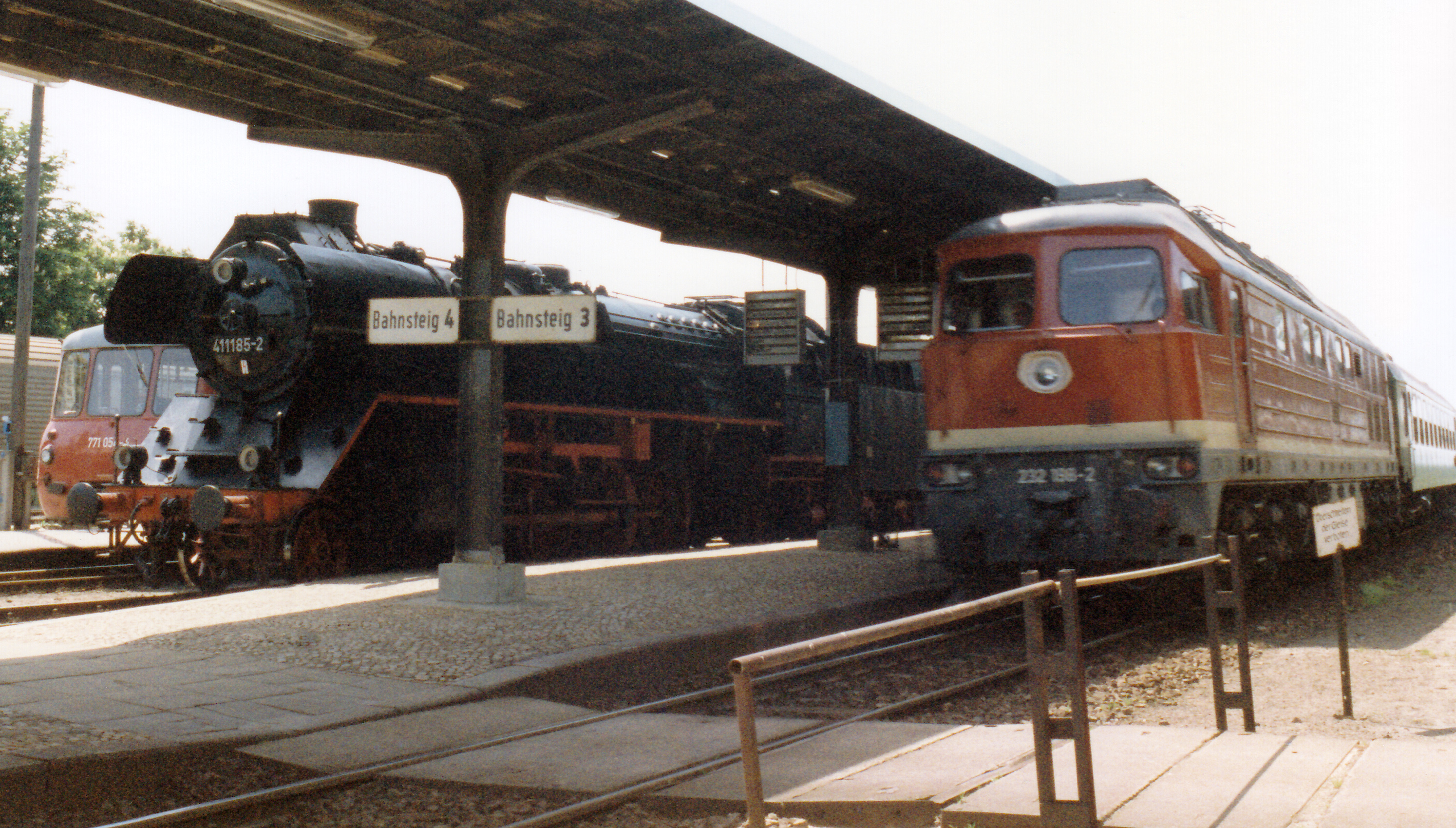
Blumenberg in 1992

Oschersleben station is the most important station on the line to Halberstadt. It was built together with the construction of the line to Brunswick. The southern side of the V-shaped station (German: Keilbahnhof) serves trains to Halberstadt and the northern side formerly served trains to Jerxheim and Brunswick and the trains of the Oschersleben–Schöningen railway. The station building is located between the tracks and originally contained the customs and passport control facilities for travelling between the Duchy of Brunswick and the Kingdom of Prussia. After the division of Germany after 1945, the route to Jerxheim was closed and in consequence the northern side of the station lost most of its purpose. Until 1991, a few daily passenger trains shuttled from there to the border town of Gunsleben. In recent years a few trains from Magdeburg terminated on the north side of the station. Meanwhile, the tracks and the large reception hall on the north side are virtually unused.

=== Halberstadt ===
Halberstadt station is a major transfer point to the northern Harz rail network. There are interchanges to Halle, Magdeburg, Hanover, Thale, Hildesheim, Goslar and Blankenburg. Halberstadt station is also connected to the local tram and bus networks. The railway tracks in Halberstadt station were modernized in recent years.

=== Wegeleben ===
Wegeleben station used to have a lobby and a restaurant. After the change passenger numbers decreased and these facilities were closed. Further modifications were made, and in 2007 the station was modernized. It now has two platforms, a bypass track and new signalling systems.

=== Quedlinburg ===
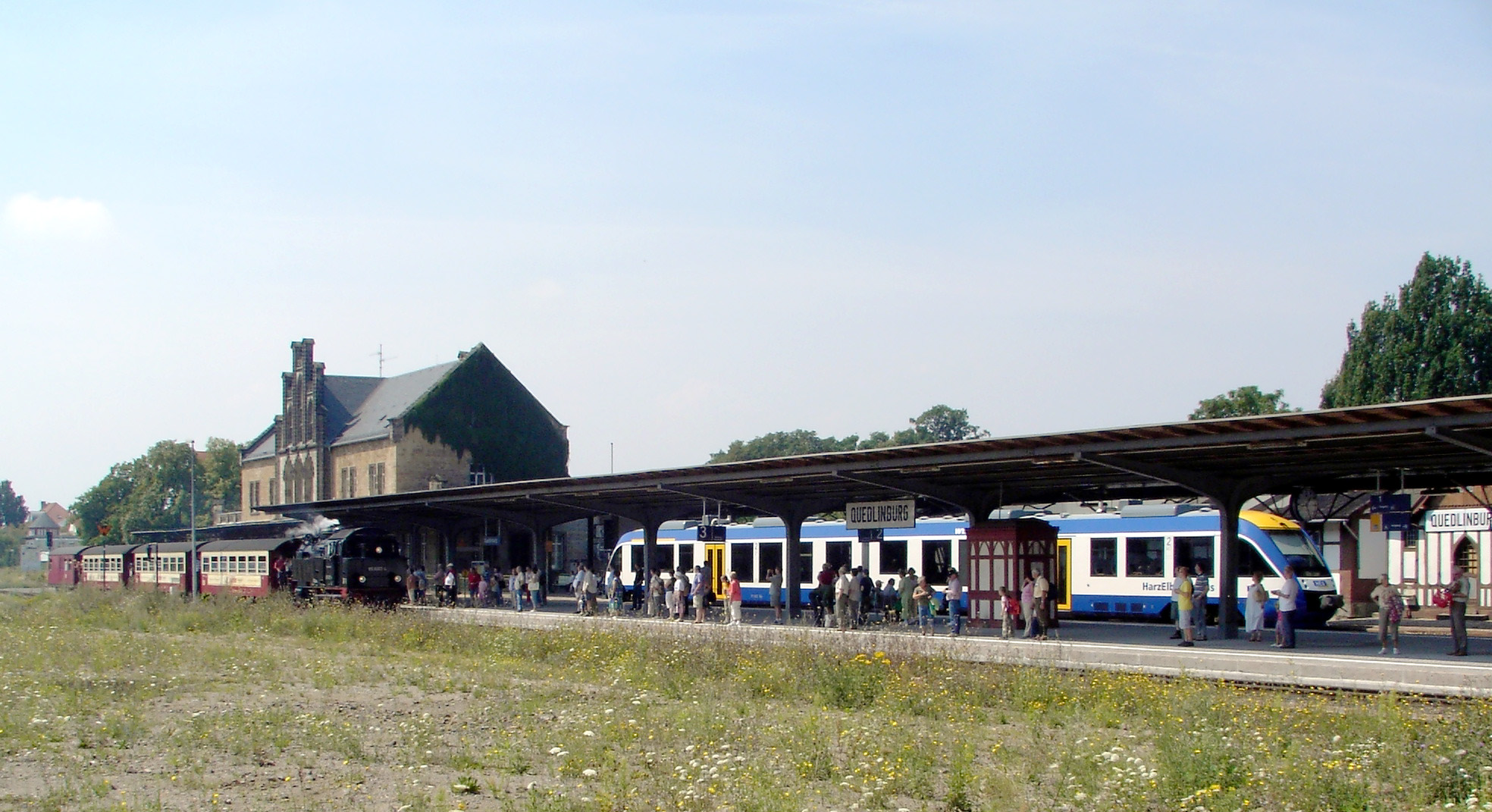
Quedlinburg station with transfer to HSB

Quedlinburg station was built in 1863 as a through station. In 2004 the Frose–Quedlinburg line closed. In 2006 the extension of the metre gauge Selke Valley Railway was opened from Gernrode by adapting the abandoned standard gauge line. Thus, it is possible to change to narrow gauge trains to Gernrode and Eisfelder Talmühle. Platform 1 west from 1908 to 1969 served the line to Thale Bodetal and Blankenburg.

=== Neinstedt ===
Neinstedt station formerly had two platform tracks and freight tracks, but now has only one track. The former station building, which included a restaurant, was demolished in spring 2009.

=== Thale Musestieg ===
Thale Musestieg station was opened on 18 December 2001.

=== Thale Hauptbahnhof ===
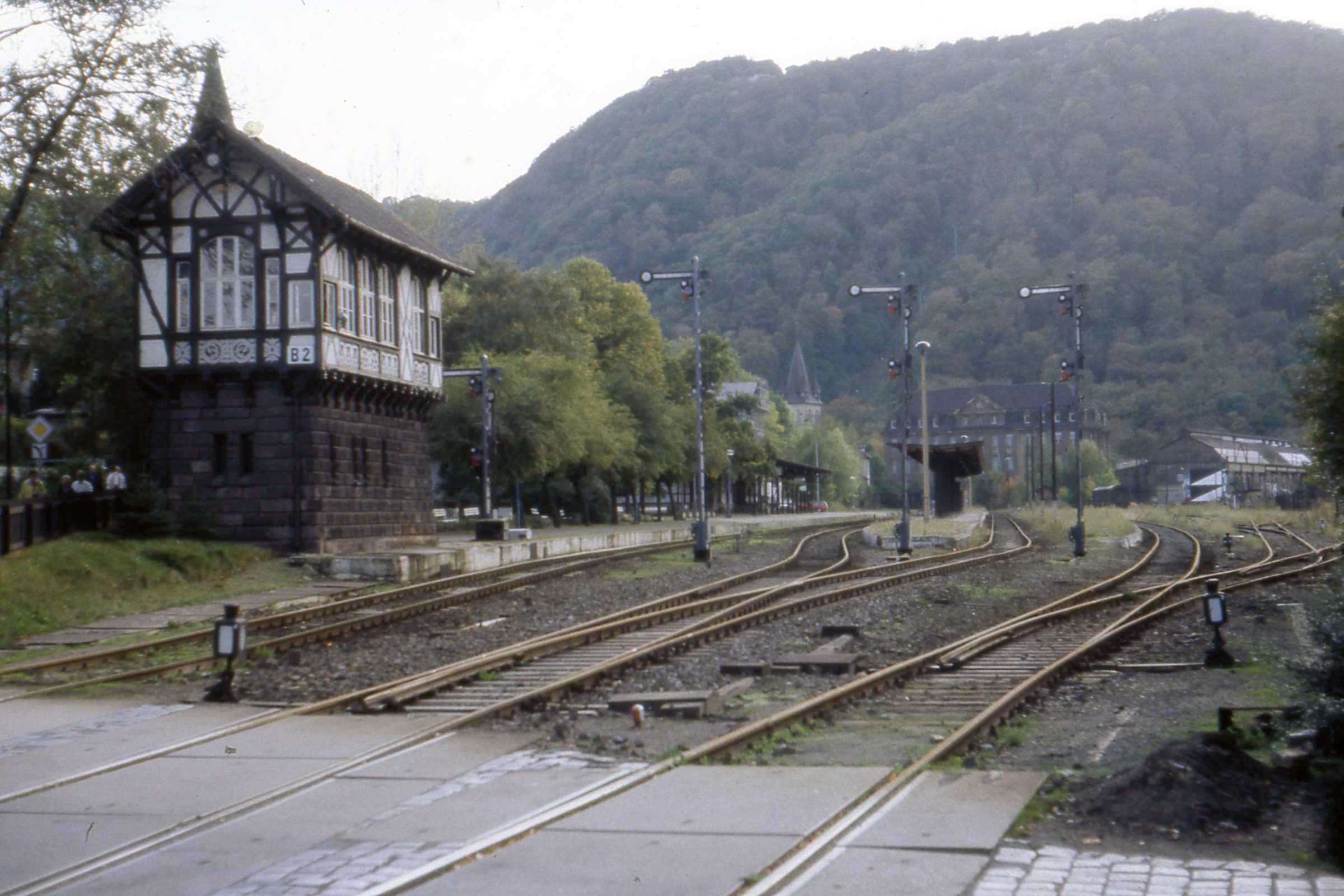
Thale Hauptbahnhof in 1995

The Thale station is a terminus built directly on the edge of the Harz. In 1907 an additional station was opened at Thale-Bodetal. From the Thale station there was once a connection through the Thale steel works to the adjacent line to Blankenburg. Of its three platforms only one is now used for scheduled services.

== Current services ==
Services on the line have been operated since 11 December 2005 for an initial twelve years by Transdev Sachsen-Anhalt as part of the Nordharznetz (north Harz network). LINT 41 and LINT 27 sets have been used. The services run under the name of HEX (Harz-Elbe-Express) hourly in each direction, including on the weekend. Trains cross in Blumenberg, Halberstadt and Quedlinburg. The express train operates as a double set on the Magdeburg−Halberstadt section. While one portion continues to Thale, the second portion continues either to Blankenburg or Vienenburg. The intervening stations between Magdeburg and Oschersleben are served during the peak hour and every two hours during the non-peak with a travel time of about 40 minutes. The express trains to Halberstadt stop only in Oschersleben and Nienhagen (b. Halberstadt), with a travel time of about 43 to 48 minutes.

On weekends, the Harz-Berlin-Express (HBX) provides a direct connection between the Harz and Berlin. During the weekend (Fridays to Sundays), the train from Thale leave in the late afternoon and is coupled in Halberstadt with a train portion that comes from Vienenburg. The journeys from Berlin Ostbahnhof to the Harz start on Saturdays and Sundays in the morning and on Sundays in the evening.

== Prospects ==
The Magdeburg–Halberstadt section is being raised to a consistent for a speed of 120 km/h. The time for trains running from Magdeburg to Halberstadt would be reduced to only 40 minutes. The Halberstadt–Wegeleben section is already upgraded for use by tilt trains and for operation at the higher speeds. 100 km/h can already be achieved on the line to Quedlinburg. The line between Magdeburg and Langenweddingen would be upgraded to be used by a service of the S-Bahn Mittelelbe (Central Elbe S-Bahn) and a new halt would be built at Gewerbegebiet Osterweddingen. In return, it is planned to drop the stop in Blumenberg.

The upgrade started in 2015. Construction section 2.1 Oschersleben–Halberstadt was put into operation in 2016 and construction section 2.2 Blumenberg–Oschersleben was planned to be completed on 27 March 2017. The new bridge over the B 246 to the east of the Oschersleben (Bode) station has been usable since March 2017 and the road under it to be opened in November 2017. The opening of construction section 1 Magdeburg–Blumenberg was scheduled for 2018. Overall, the Magdeburg–Halberstadt upgrade is estimated to cost €55 million.

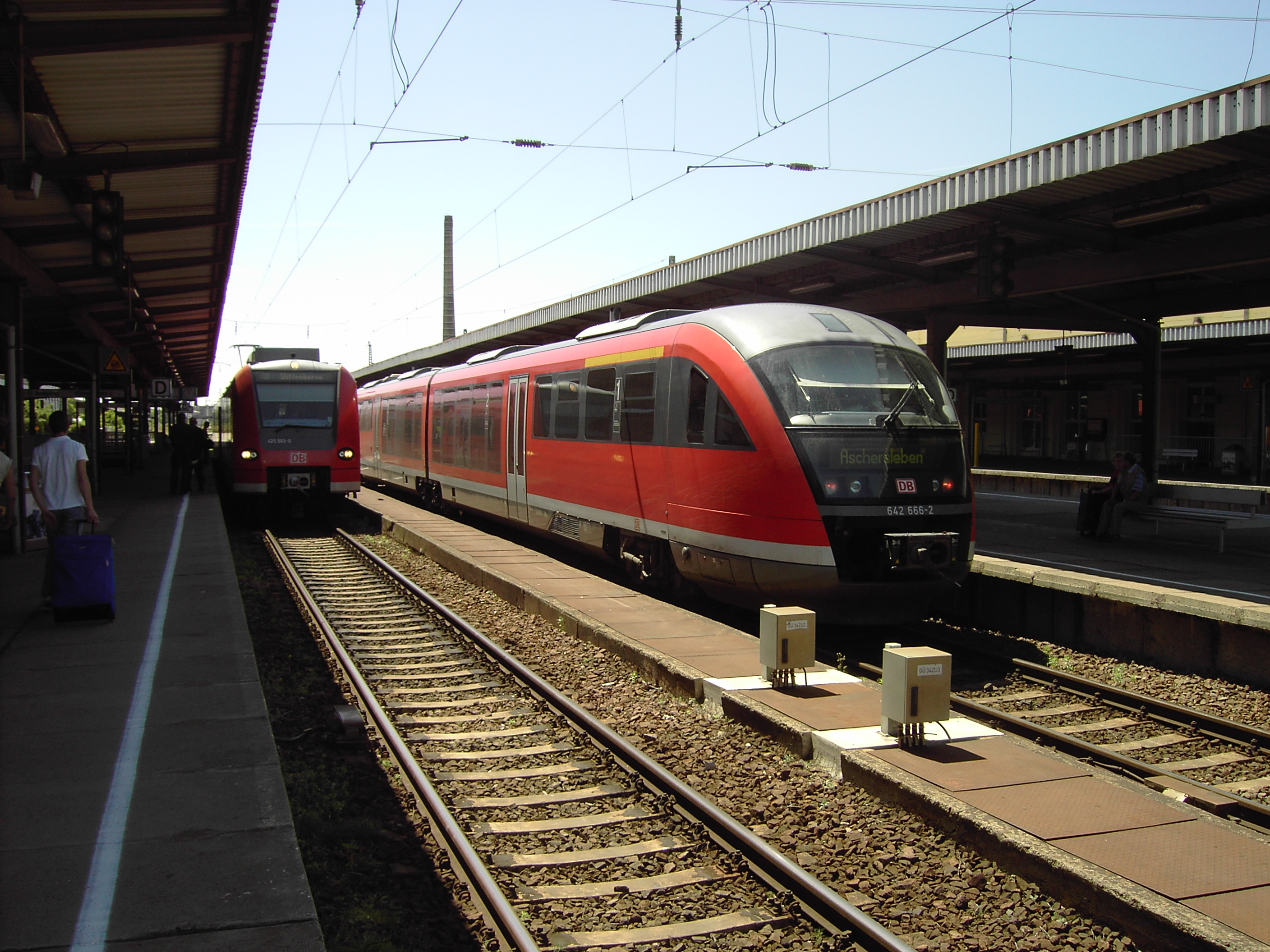
Magdeburg Hbf

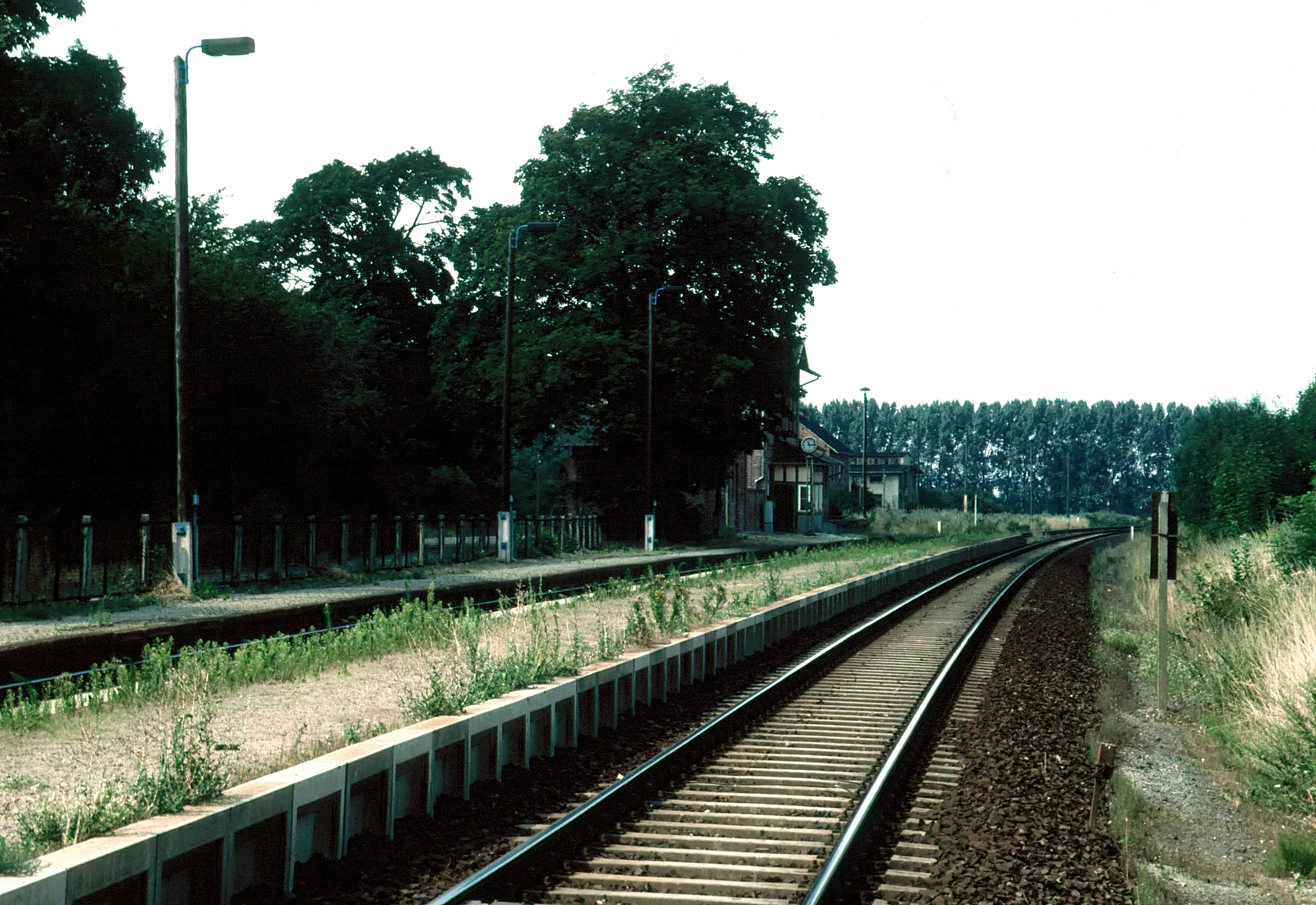
Krottorf halt (1996)

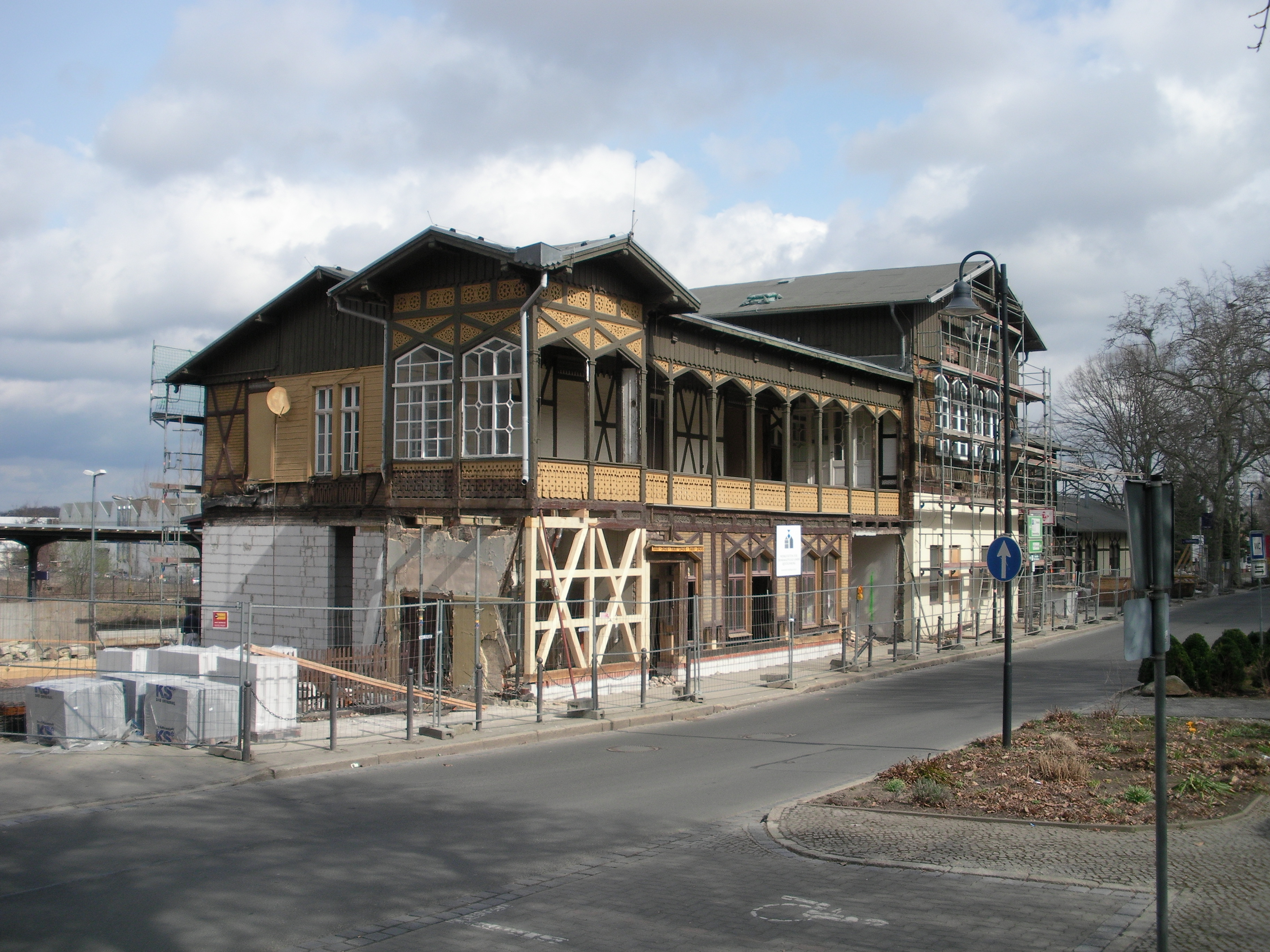
Thale Hbf (under repair, 2011)
