= Quedlinburg station =

Railway station in Quedlinburg, Saxony-Anhalt, Germany

Quedlinburg
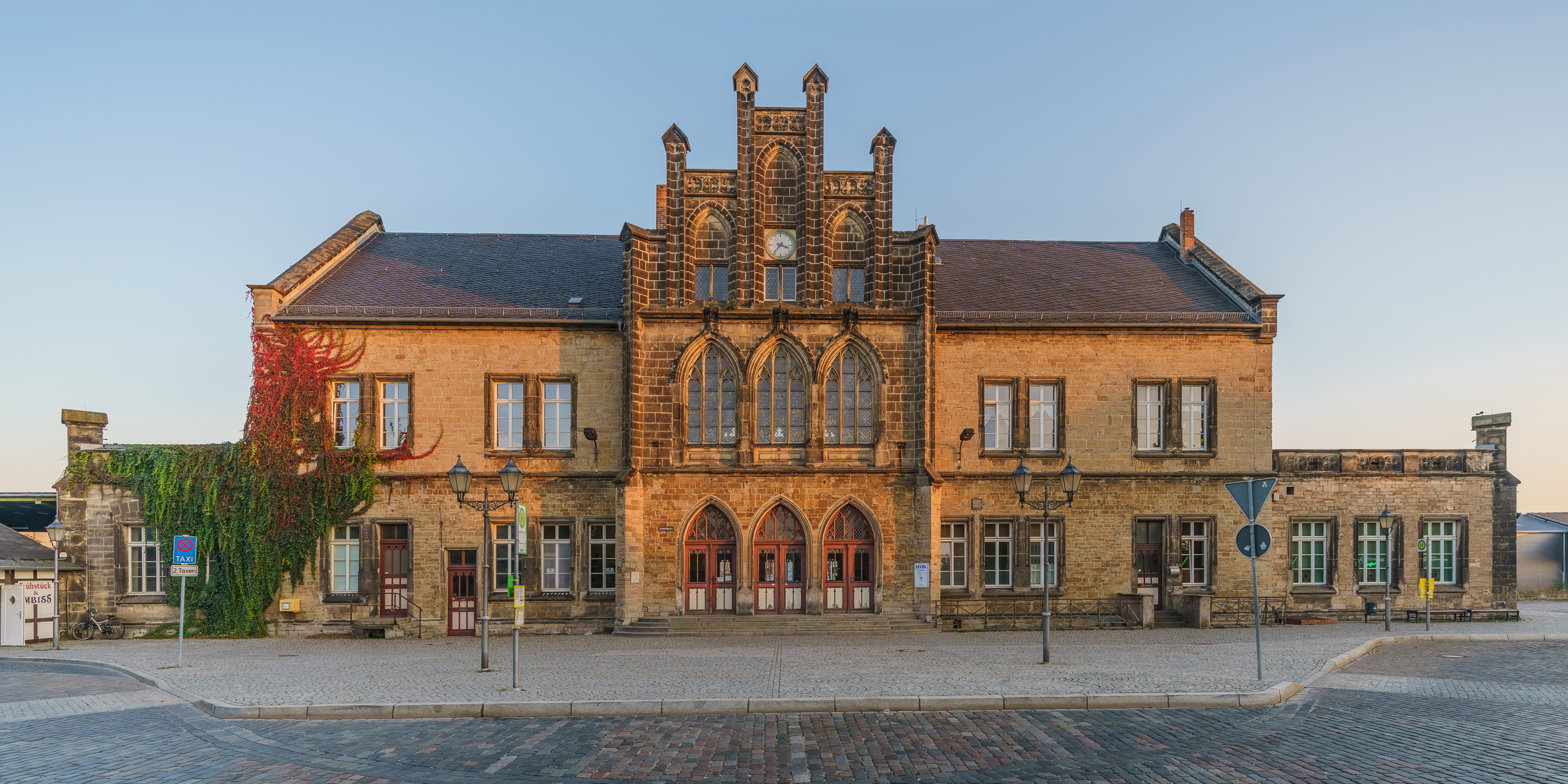

General information
- Location: Bahnhofsvorplatz 1, Quedlinburg, Saxony-Anhalt; Germany
- Coordinates: 51°47′07″N 11°09′10″E
- Lines: Magdeburg–Thale (KBS 315); Quedlinburg–Eisfelder Talmühle (KBS 333); former Frose–Quedlinburg; former Blankenburg–Quedlinburg
- Platforms: 3 (formerly 4)

Construction
- Accessible: Yes
- Architect: Gothic Revival

Other information
- Station code: 5068
- DS100 code: LQB
- IBNR: 8010290
- Category: 5
- Fare zone: marego: 693
- Website: www.bahnhof.de

History
- Opened: 1863

Services
Preceding station	Abellio Rail Mitteldeutschland	Following station
Neinstedt towards Thale Hbf	RE 11	Ditfurt towards Magdeburg Hbf
Location
- Location within Saxony-Anhalt Location within Germany Location within Europe

Quedlinburg station is a station on the Magdeburg–Thale railway in Quedlinburg in the German state of Saxony-Anhalt. It was built in 1862 as a through station on the southern edge of the town. The Gothic Revival entrance building of 1862, together with the other parts of the nearly complete Gründerzeit ensemble, is heritage-protected.

Since the conversion of part of the formerly standard-gauge line to Frose in 2006 to create the Quedlinburg–Gernrode section of the metre gauge Selke Valley Railway (Selketalbahn), it has been an interchange station between that line and the standard gauge Halberstadt–Thale railway. From 1908 to 1969, the station was also served by the line to Blankenburg, the so-called Quäke.

Of the other four former Quedlinburg stations, the request stop of Quedlinburg-Quarmbeck is the only one still operating.

== Location ==
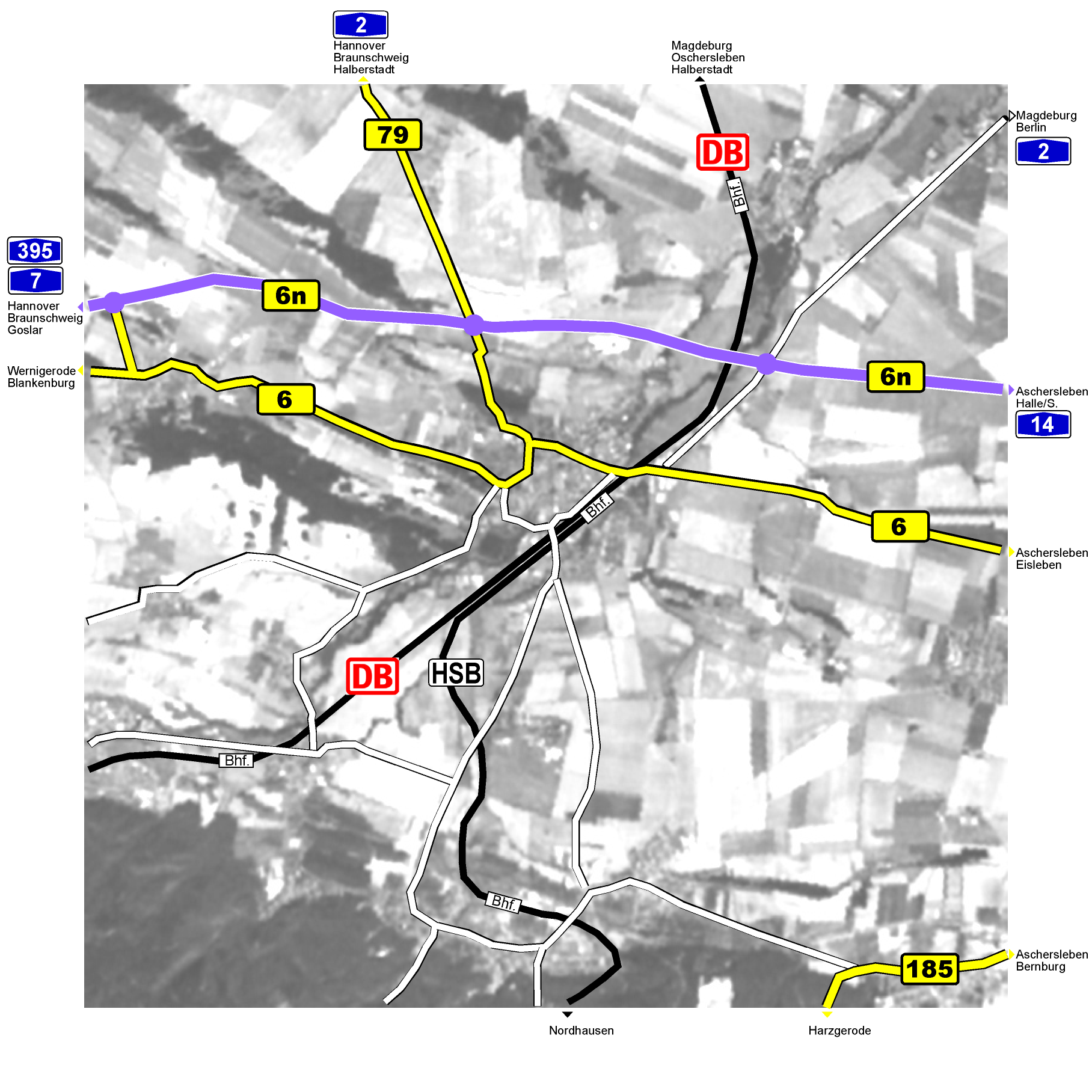
Location in Quedlinburg

The station is located on the eastern side of the Bode, about 850 metres from the market square of the medieval old town. In front of the station there are two squares, first the station forecourt (Bahnhofsplatz) and, on the other side of the river, the Friedrich-Ebert-Platz. The station is connected to the town by the station bridge (Bahnhofsbrücke), which was rebuilt after a devastating flood in 1925 and redeveloped in the late 1990s. The station is located on Quedlinburg's town ring with the streets of Rathenaustraße and Harzweg adjacent to it. There were formerly numerous metal and industrial factories in the street of Klopstockweg at the back of the station that used the freight yard. Companies such as a rolling works used to be connected to the rail network. With the decline of industry in the early 1990s, the volume of freight dropped, so that the freight yard was abandoned. In its place there is now a parking area for tax office workers and a commuter parking area for cycles, cars and buses including an access road from Frachtstraße and Stresemannstraße. The building complex of the former Mertik Maxitrol company was rebuilt and rebuilt as the tax office of the Harz district.

== History ==
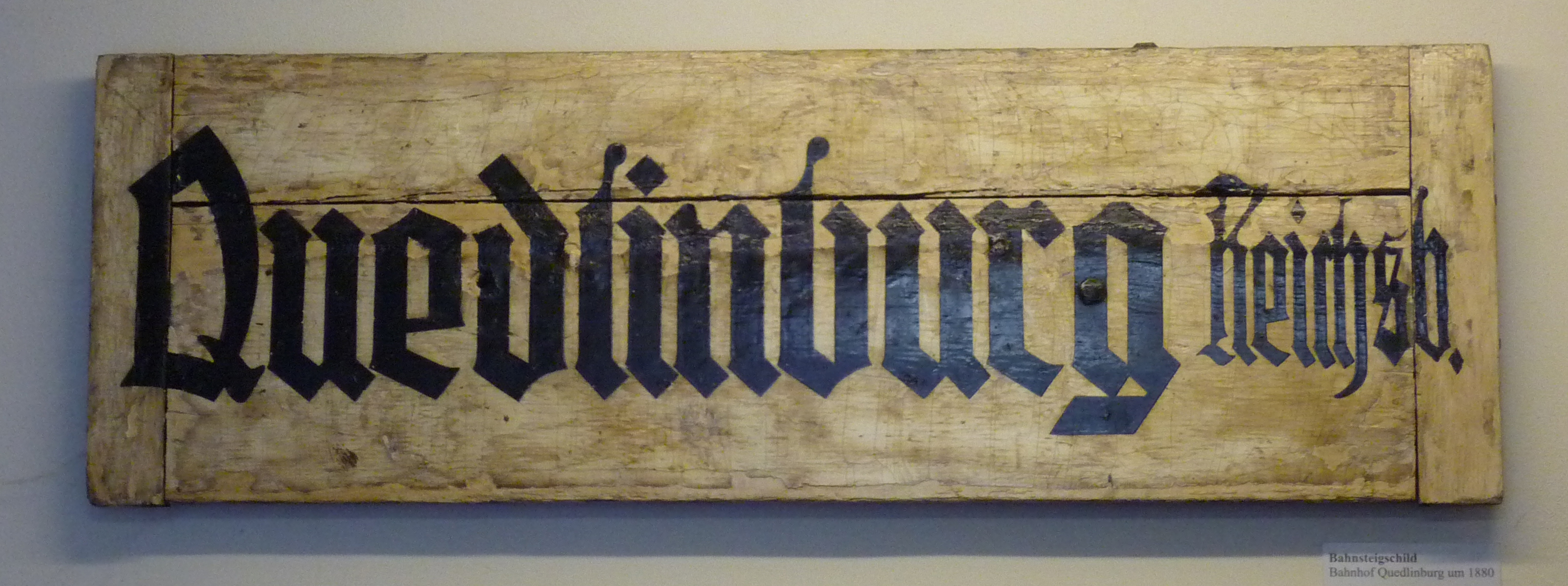
Historic station sign of Quedlinburg

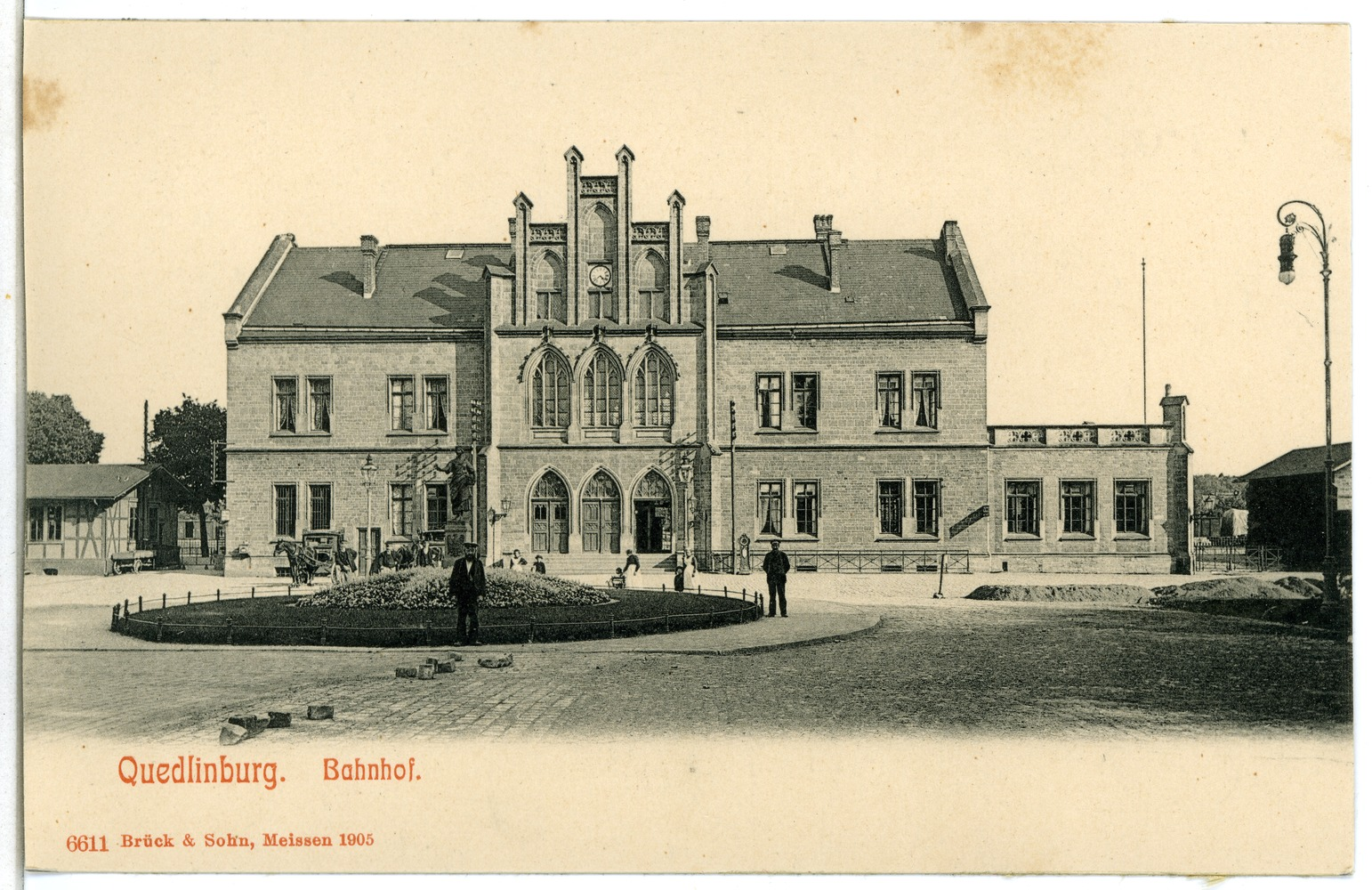
Station in 1905

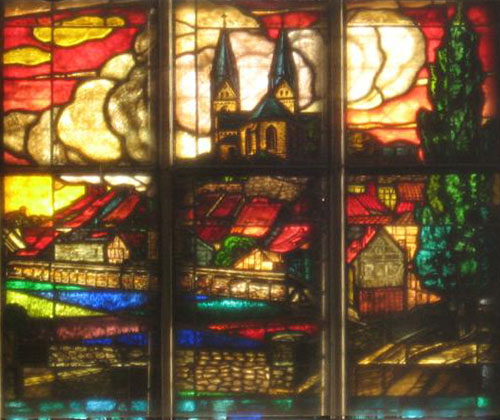
View of a detail of the station hall windows showing the old towers of the collegiate church

The station was opened on 2 July 1862 with the railway line from Halberstadt to Thale. The entrance building and other buildings date from its opening. A number of industrial companies settled in the following years near the railway. In 1885, Quedlinburg became a small railway junction with the opening of the line to Gernrode and Ballenstedt. The railway line to Blankenburg was opened in 1908. The station had to be rebuilt to accommodate the additional trains. During the reconstruction, a new platform 1 West and a new water tower were built.

Quedlinburg station also played a significant role in times of peace. During the First World War, Quedlinburg Station was used to transport prisoners of war who were being transported to or from the Quedlinburg POW camp on the Ritteranger, two kilometres north of Quedlinburg. The first prisoners arrived in Quedlinburg on 24 September 1914. The railway area was heavily fought over in March 1920 during the Kapp Putsch. Evidence of this is provided by photographs of the bombed station tunnels, although the history of the fighting is not known in detail.

Shortly before the end of the Second World War, the Allies suspected that V-2 rockets were being transported by Quedlinburg station. However, the planned bombing was not carried out. The reason for this suspicion was the existence of a V2 factory in Nordhausen. This belonged to the concentration camp of Mittelbau-Dora, which established field offices in September 1944 in, inter alia, Quedlinburg and Traunstein. Therefore, it was erroneously assumed that such a production facility existed in Quedlinburg, but these outposts had no association with V-2 production and maintenance. Nevertheless, in April 1945, a freight train with individual V2 parts actually stood on a siding at the gas works. The engineers Rössler and Bühring conducted this train on 10 April to near Ditfurt, where it was captured by American units.

Passenger traffic was abandoned on the railway to Blankenburg in 1969. Sidings off the line in the urban area were still served until 1993. Passenger trains were hauled by steam locomotives until 1988.

The importance of the freight and marshalling yard fell with the decline of the metal industry in the Quedlinburg station area at the beginning of the 1990s. Therefore, it was partially shut down. The first tracks were dismantled as early as the mid-1990s in order to extend the grounds of a company in Stresemannstraße. During redevelopment by Deutsche Bahn of the infrastructure of the Magdeburg–Thale line, the sidings towards Magdeburger Straße were removed and the line up to Badeborner Weg level crossing was converted to single-track. At the same time, the signaling technology was updated.

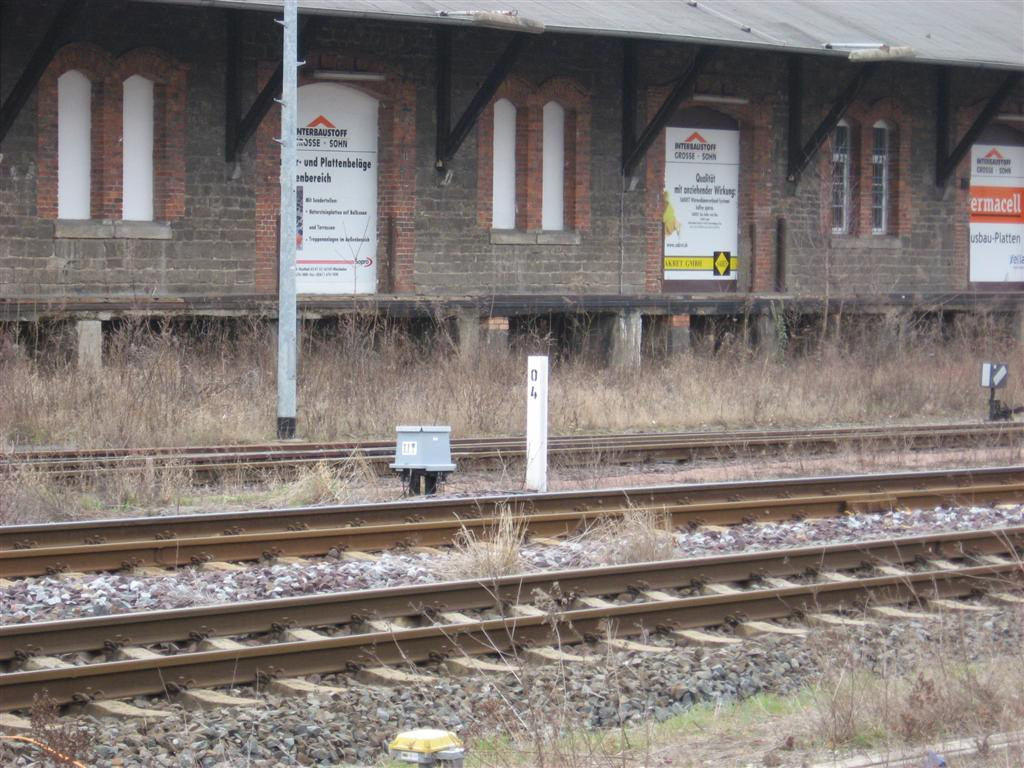
Kilometre post of the Harz Narrow Gauge Railways (Harzer Schmalspurbahnen), in the background is a preserved building of the freight yard

In December 2003, the Minister of Transport of Saxony-Anhalt, Karl-Heinz Daehre signed an agreement with the Harz Narrow Gauge Railways (Harzer Schmalspurbahnen GmbH—HSB) to build a connection from the Selke Valley Railway (Selketalbahn) to Quedlinburg and develop interchange facilities at Quedlinburg station. The last infrastructure of the former Quedlinburg freight yard disappeared with the reconstruction of the southeastern part of the station by the Harz Narrow Gauge Railways. Instead, there is now a modern parking area for bicycles, cars and buses. This also enabled a barrier-free crossing to be built to the island platform above ground level. Before that, only access through the tunnel was possible. The 182 metre-long island platform was 2007 renovated in just three months and handed over in June 2007. A total of €450,000 were used to raise the platforms, relocate the paving and install guidance for the visually impaired. However, as the station complex is also a listed building, both the platform canopy, the pedestrian tunnel exits and the original natural stone platform edges were preserved. However, part of the platform was removed behind the tunnel entrance to provide access between platforms 1 and 2/3.

In the future, the terrain of the former marshalling yard is to be upgraded. The line to Thale is maintained mainly for tourism. A planned refurbishment of platform 1 has not yet been undertaken. The future of the pedestrian tunnel is under study. Different parties are responsible for the renovation of the buildings, as some of the buildings and the ground floor of the entrance building have been sold by DB Station&Service.

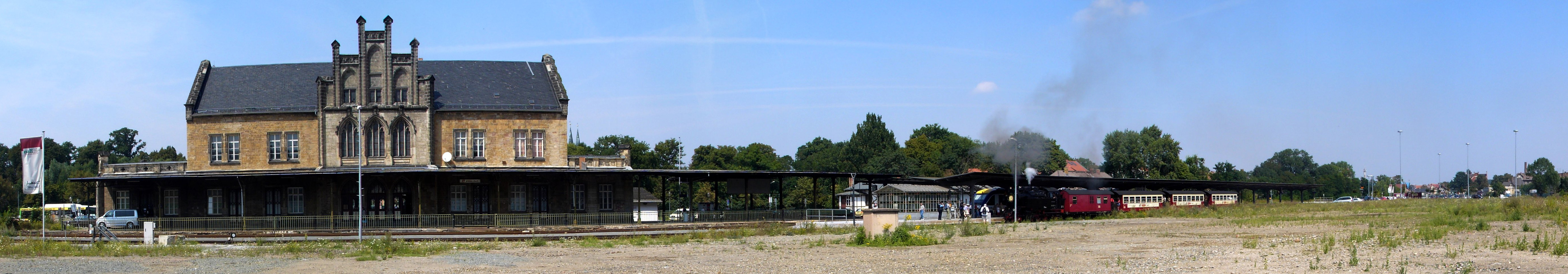
The back of the station, with the grounds of the former freight yard in the foreground

In the spring of 2009, Mitteldeutsche Baustoffe GmbH was commissioned to rehabilitate the already disused and isolated second track between the Magdeburger Straße level crossing and the former Groß Orden siding. A railway loading plant for gravel and greywacke was built in the area of the former coal yard. Goods from Bode Kieswerk in Ditfurt, two kilometres away, and from the quarry in Rieder, twelve kilometers away, are transhipped from trucks to trains here. It was planned to resume operations after the restoration of the siding on 24 June 2009 and the relocation of two kilometres of track from the end of July 2009, but trial operations could only start in October 2009 and regular operations began on 12 May 2010. Annual traffic of about 200,000 ton was sought. Trains up to 590 metres-long were to be used. The 126 tonne heavy diesel locomotive (Voith Maxima 40 CC) that hauled this traffic was named Quedlinburg on 27 May 2011.

The Bahnhofsmission (a Christian charity) in Halberstadt has been responsible for care for people in need in Quedlinburg station since 30 May 2011.

The main platform and the underpass is to be renewed by 2018. In addition, the construction of new lifts is planned. €3 million have been provided for the whole project.

== Architecture ==
=== Buildings ===
The station has a nearly complete ensemble from the Gründerzeit. It consists of a listed Gothic Revival entrance building from 1862, a locomotive shed from 1862 and 1889/1892, a goods shed, one of the oldest surviving turntables in Germany from 1889, an express freight shed and a toilet block. Furthermore, it includes a water tower of the Schäfer type from 1907/1908, a residence building from 1906, signal boxes from 1907/1908, a toilet block from 1908, a ticket office from 1909 and a water crane from the period around 1955.

The interior of the Gothic Revival entrance building has stained glass windows, which were redesigned in 1906. These were produced by the Ferdinand Müller stained glass factory and represent views of the castle hill (Schlossberg) and the town hall (Rathaus). The station has been entered in the list of Quedlinburg cultural monuments.

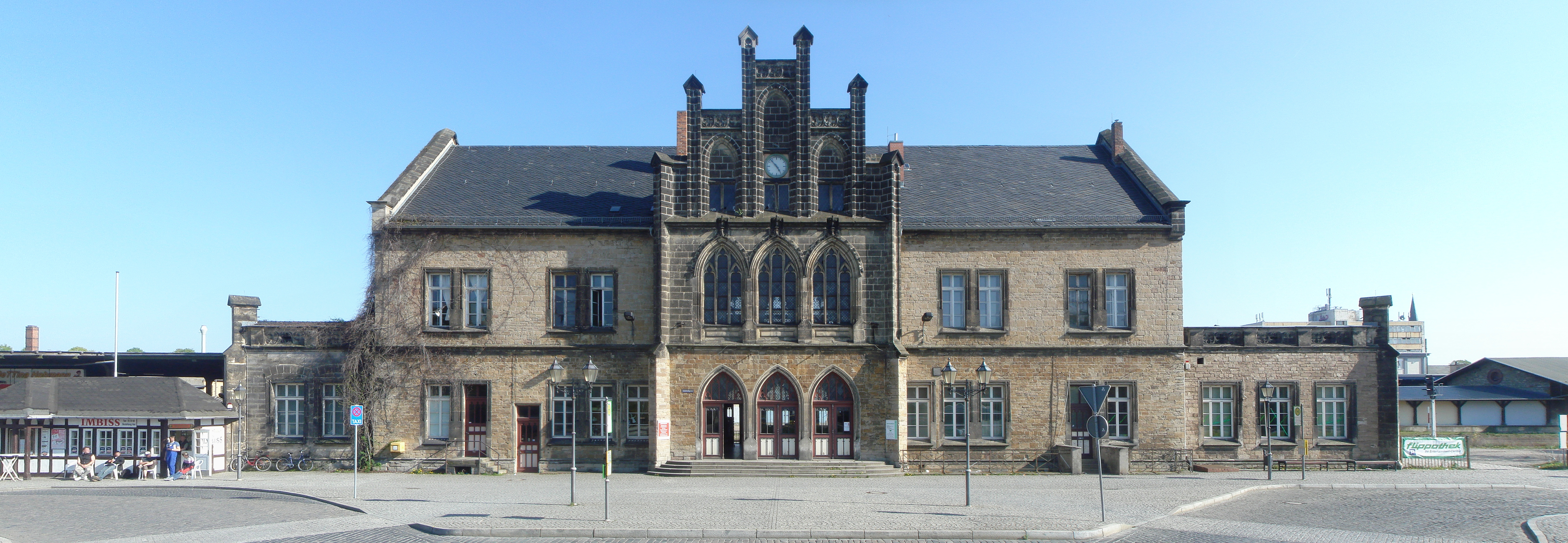
Panorama of the station building with outbuildings (2009)

=== Signal boxes ===
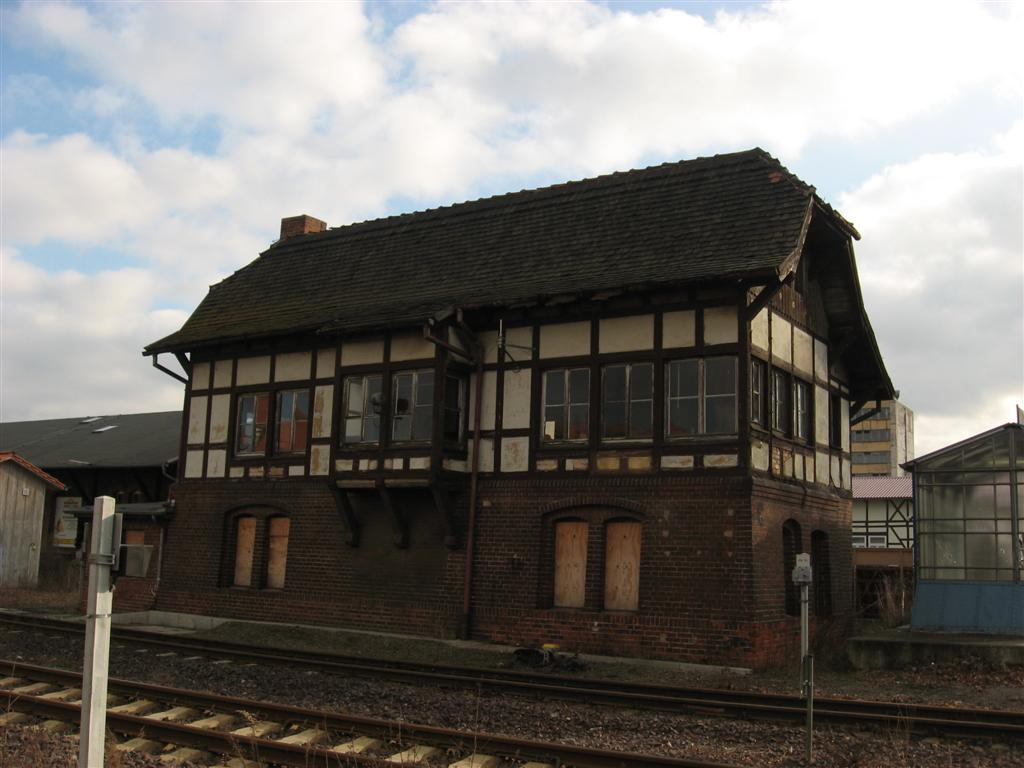
Former Qmf signalbox

There were two signal boxes in the Quedlinburg station area: "Qmf" and "Qo". The dispatcher sat in the Mitte (middle) signal box (Qmf), which was built in 1908; this was a mechanical box of the Jüdel type. The building at the Stresemannstraße level crossing was abandoned during the work to connect the HSB to the station and the abandonment of old railway tracks in 2007. The Qmf nameplate had already been removed. All signalling control was centralised in the Quedlinburg-Ost (east) box (Qo, on the Frachtstraße level crossing). This was a mechanical signal box of the E/GS II type. The third signal box in Quedlinburg was located in the area of Quedlinburg-West (Qw) and was responsible for the Quäke marshalling yard. Qw had reduced responsibilities with the abandonment of the Blankenburg–Quedlinburg railway and its station. In the end, it was only a gatekeeper's box, looking after the Gernröder Weg level crossing. It became redundant with the re-gauging and modernisation of signalling at the level crossings and is now out of service. Qw was like Qmf equipped with a mechanical interlocking of the Jüdel type.

=== Level crossings ===
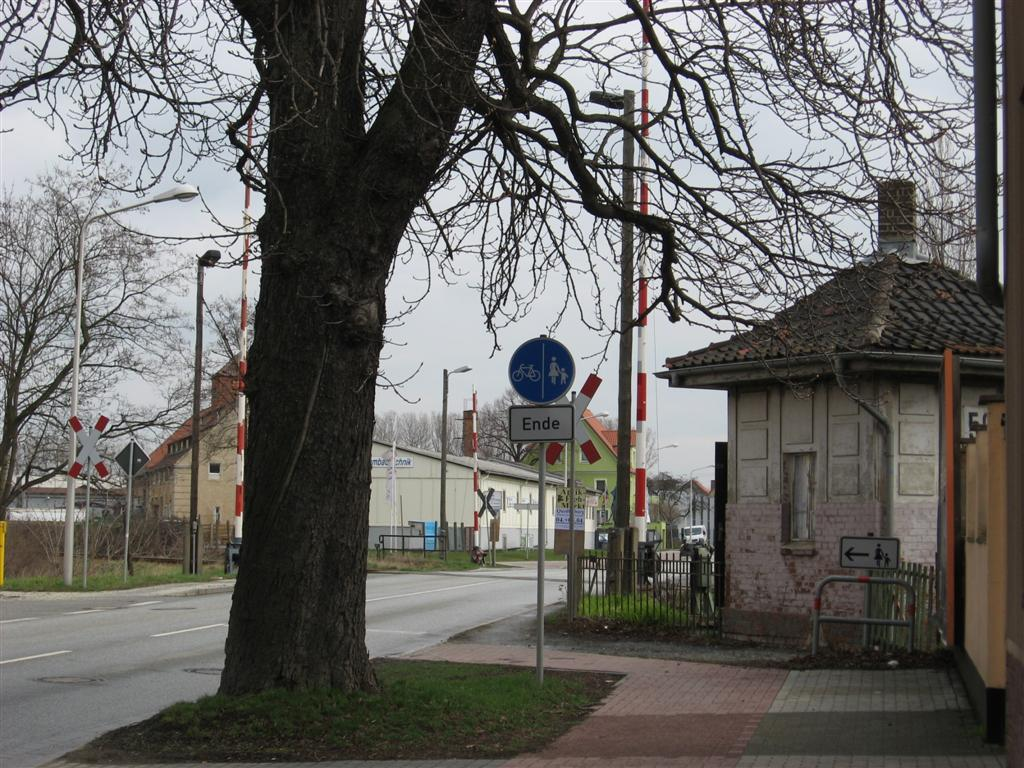
Magdeburger Straße (formerly B6, not upgraded until late 2013)

In central Quedlinburg there are ten level crossings, two of which are used exclusively for agricultural traffic. At the end of the 20th century, the full barrier systems were manually operated. The gatekeepers worked at Gernröder Weg, at the Quedlinburg Ost, Mitte and West signal boxes and at the Magdeburger Straße crossing. Initially, the Frachtstraße level crossing was upgraded to electronic-control by the Quedlinburg-Ost interlocking, followed by the Gernröder Weg and Neinstedter Feldweg crossings. As part of the conversion of a line to be incorporated in the Harz narrow gauge railways in 2005/2006, the affected level crossings were converted to automatic systems with half barriers. These are additionally connected to the traffic lights at Gernröder Weg/Harzweg and Harzweg/Stresemannstraße. As a result, traffic on the connecting streets to Stresemannstraße and to Gernröder Weg is controlled, so there is no traffic jams at the crossings. The Stresemannstraße level crossing was formerly controlled by Quedlinburg-Mitte (QmF) signal box, which was directly adjacent. Like the following crossing in Albert-Schweitzer-Straße, the barriers were raised and lowered by wire ropes. Today, the level crossings have different modes of operation. Thus, the level crossing in the station area in Stresemannstraße can be operated both by the Quedlinburg-Ost signal box and fully automatically.

Necessary renovation work on the more northeastern level crossings failed to eventuate for a long time because Deutsche Bahn would not commit to carry it out or provide a share of the finance. For example, Magdeburger Straße (formerly B6, now a feeder to B6n) was completely renovated with footpaths and cycle paths on both sides except in the area of the level crossing. The lack of redevelopment meant that pedestrians and cyclists had to use the road, with a path only existing on the northern side and pedestrians having to cross the busy road. Until the end of 2013, this was the last crossing in the town that had a full barrier and was hand-operated by a gatekeeper. The barrier in Badeborner Weg was most recently operated electronically from the gatekeeper's lodge. The level crossings of Magdeburger Straße, Badeborner Weg and Frachtstraße were to be redesigned in the spring/summer of 2013 as part of the flashing light program. The plan was not implemented until the end of 2013. The crossings in the northeast of the railway station were provided with automatic half barriers with traffic signals. This meant that the last gatekeeper's lodge in Magdeburger Straße had to be demolished. Full barriers with flashing lights are still in operation only on Frachtstraße (as of February 2014), because there are safety issues in relation to the entry of trucks to the adjacent supermarket.

There is still a functioning pedestrian subway at the Stresemannstraße level crossing.

=== Extensions and conversions ===
The station forecourt was completely rebuilt in 1992. The traffic light-controlled intersection was no longer able to cope with the increase in private car traffic, so the first roundabout in Quedlinburg was built despite the protest of its inhabitants. This was accompanied by the reconstruction of the bus station, which received an entrance from Harzweg and its own exit to the roundabout. This resulted in seven bus stops with barrier-free access. Two more stops are located along Bahnhofsstraße.

== Infrastructure ==
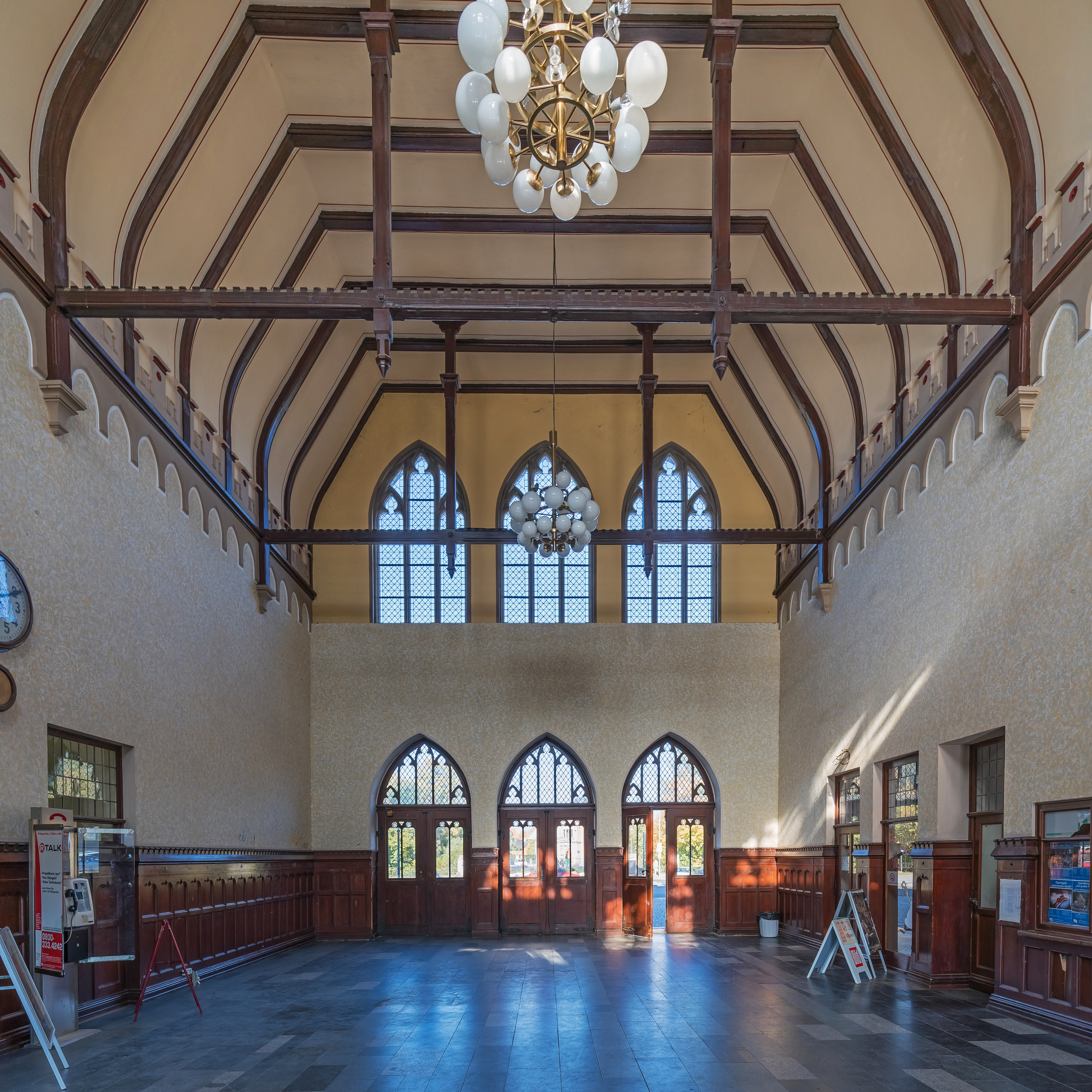
Interior of the lobby

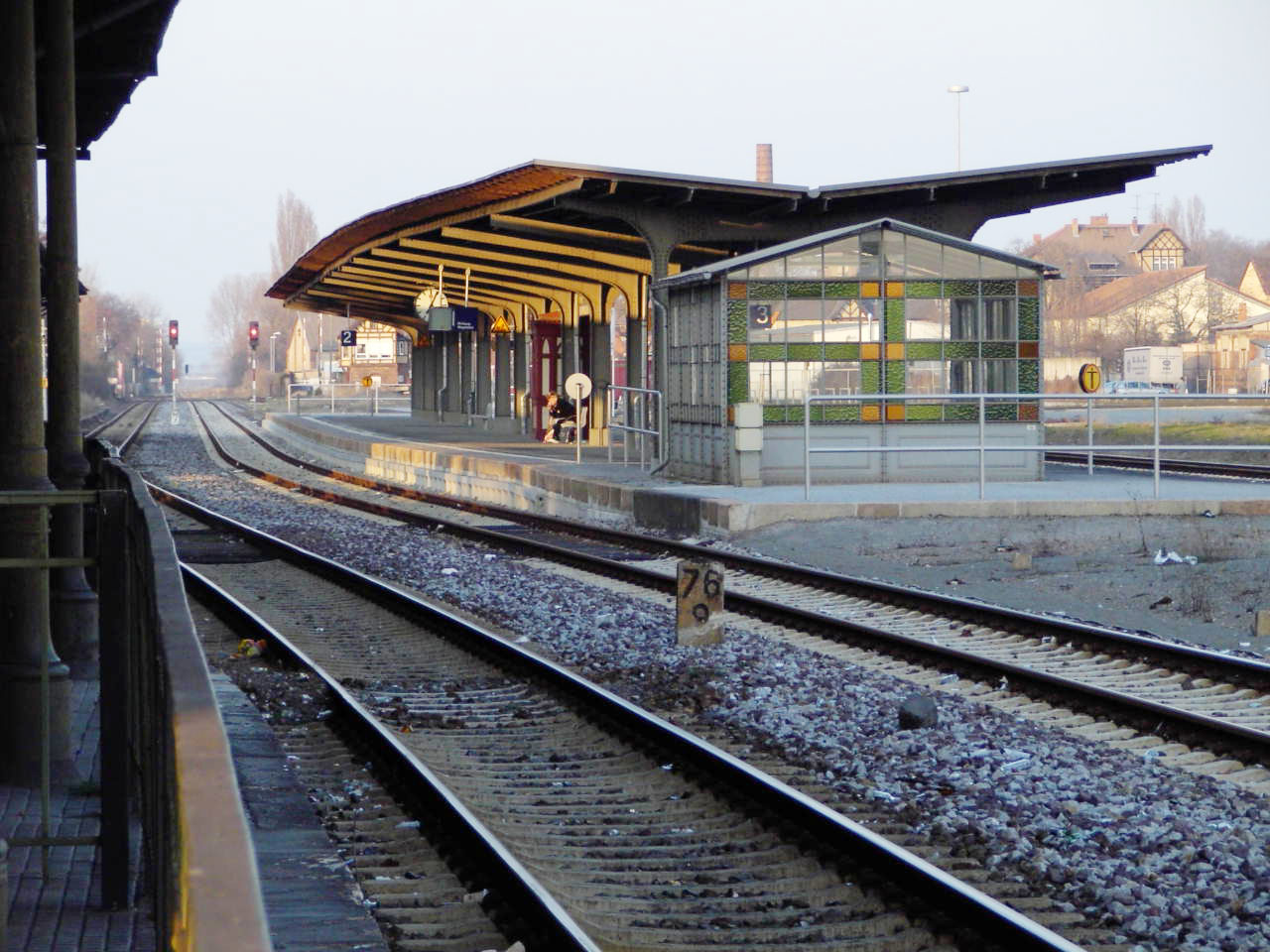
View of platform 2 and 3, 2009

=== Entrance building ===
The hall of the entrance building once accommodated numerous counters, timetables, small shops, later the Mitropa restaurant, a station barber, a newsstand and ticket machines. After Deutsche Bahn withdrew from ticket sales, Q-Bus Nahverkehrsgesellschaft took over a counter and has since sold tickets for Deutsche Bahn, Transdev (HEX), the trains of the Harz Narrow Gauge Railways, the buses of Q-Bus and Verkehrsgesellschaft Südharz (only for buses from the Harz district and the Salzland district).

=== Companies ===
Industrial companies are no longer operating in the area of the station since the bankruptcy of many companies. A building materials company has been established at the eastern end. There is also a games library in another part of the entrance building and a snack bar at the taxi stand. Another snack bar at the bus station was demolished after several fires.

=== Art in Areal B ===
There are now studios in several former railway buildings. A disused freight track was operated as a draisine line as part of an art project. The purpose of the Areal B (Areal Bahnhof—station area) is to preserve the terrain, in response to the dismantling of much of the track network, and to beautify it. Several sculptures and installations were established, but most had to be removed during the renovation of the parking area for the Harz Narrow Gauge Railways.

Steam locomotive 52 8147-2 (52 2642), built in 1942, was placed as a monument by the owner of a hotel at the station on the forecourt directly next to the station precinct on 16 September 1993. Due to major rust damage and a change of ownership of the hotel, the locomotive was auctioned in June 2006. The winner was the Oster Valley Railway (Ostertalbahn), which upgraded its own locomotive with parts of the disassembled locomotive.

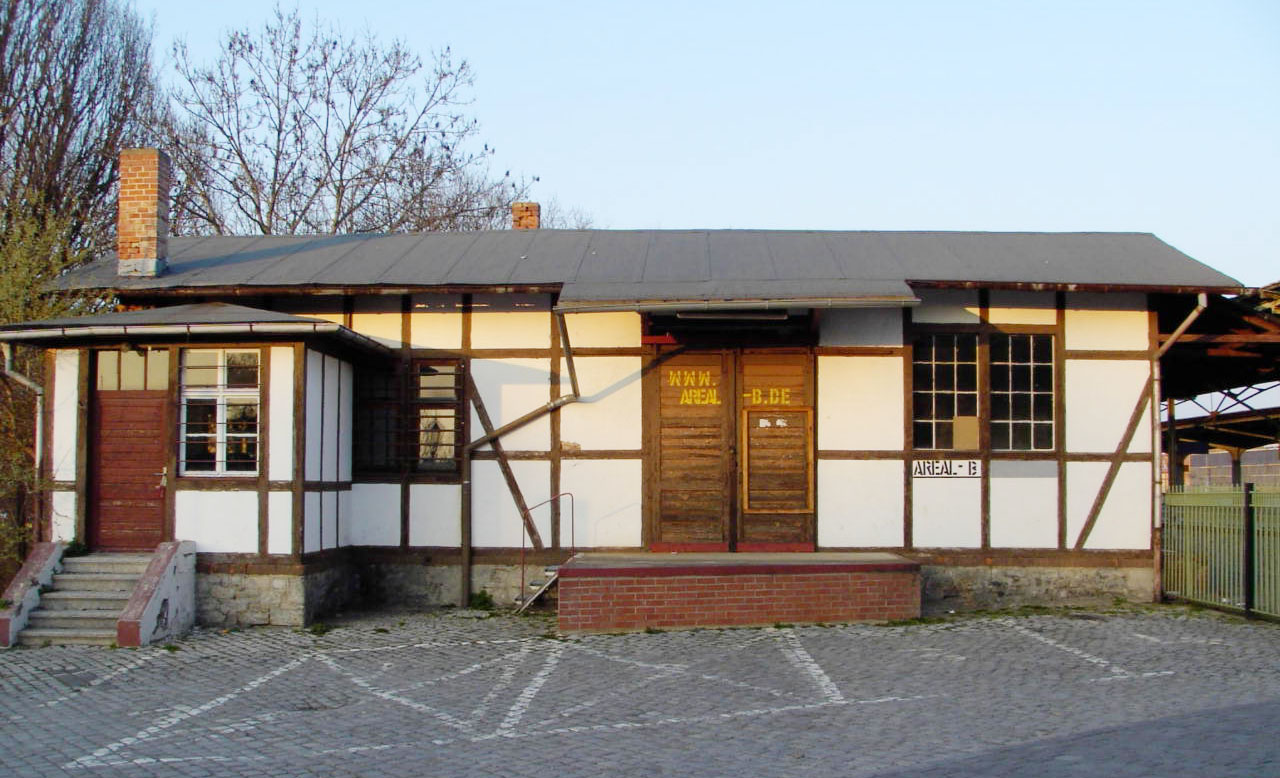
The building of Areal B

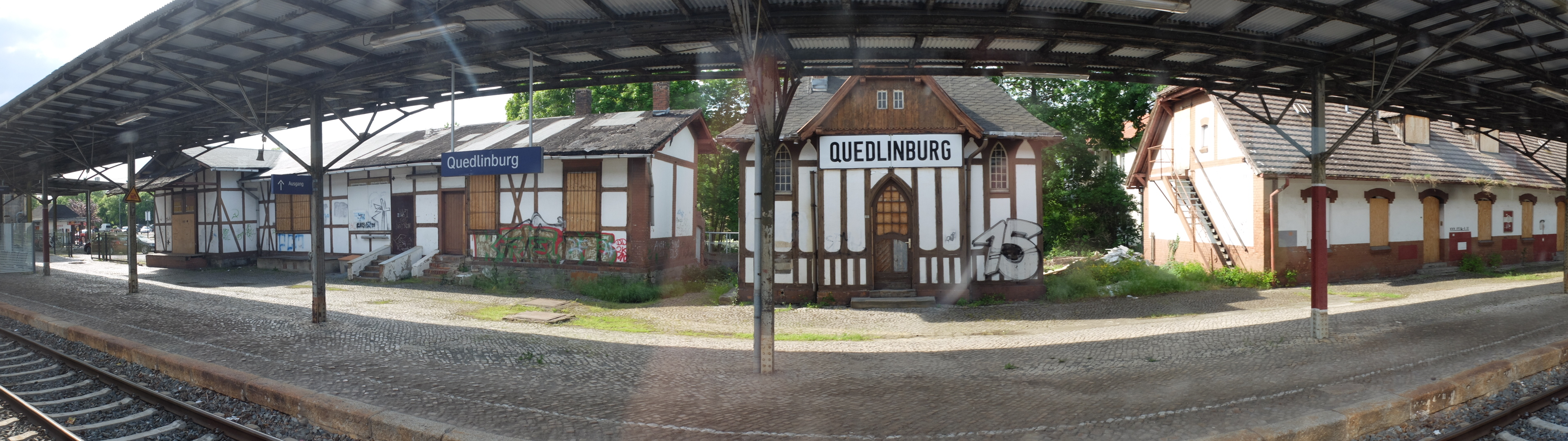
The building of Areal B from behind

== Transport connections ==
Rail services to Quedlinburg station

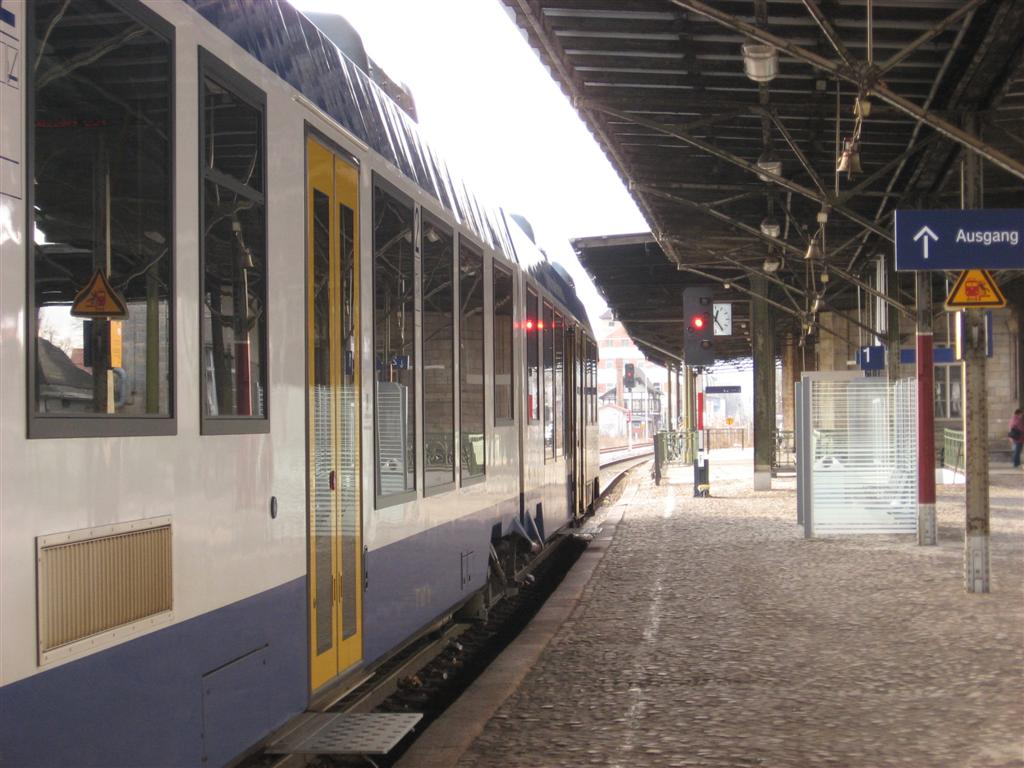
The Harz-Elbe-Express at platform 1, running towards Thale waiting for the return train

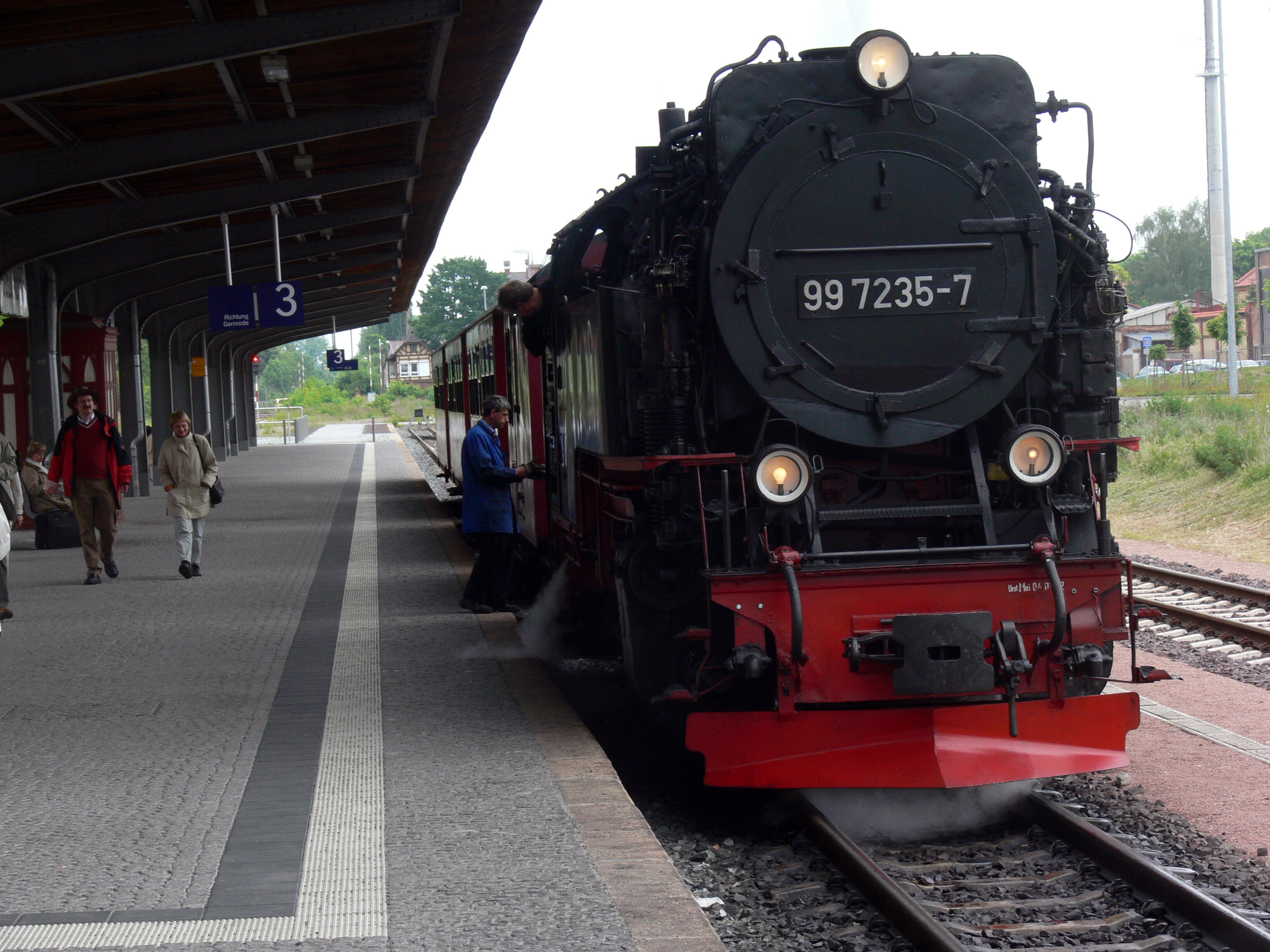
Train of the Selke Valley Railway at the modernised platform 3

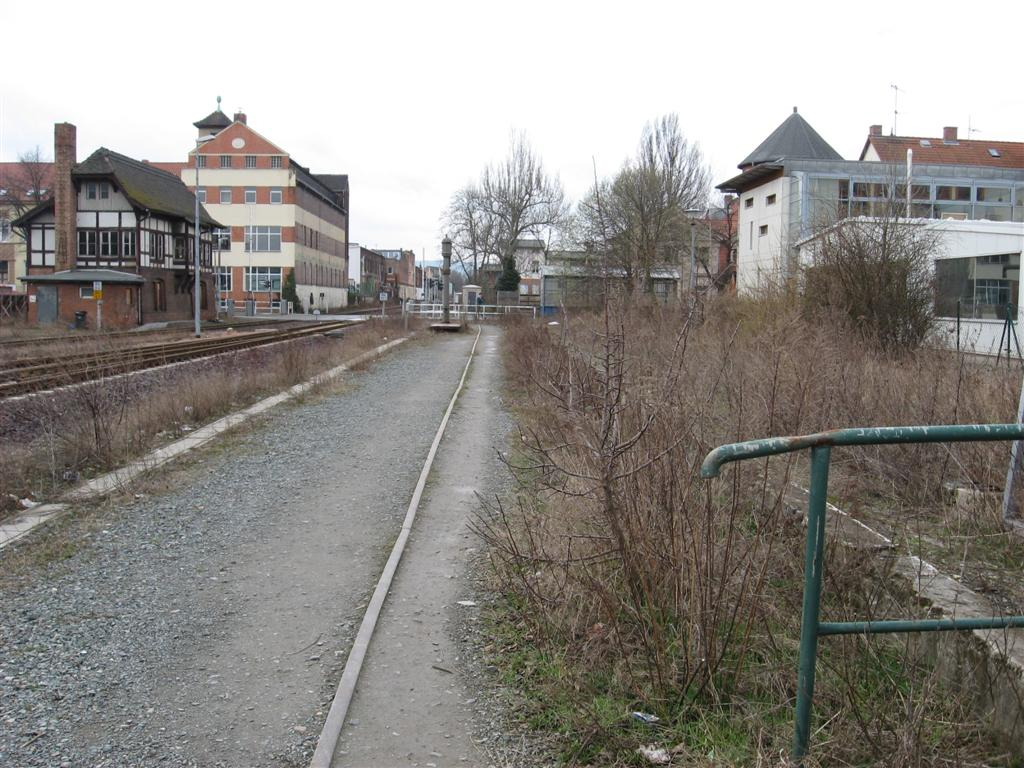
Looking from platform 1 west, the former Quäke railway is now no longer recognisable, to the left are the tracks the standard gauge line

=== Rail ===
Quedlinburg belongs to the Nordharznetz (North Harx Network, a tendered public transport concession) and serves as a stop for the public transport system. The major stations in Halberstadt and in the state capital of Magdeburg can be reached without changing. Connections can be made to long-distance routes in Magdeburg or with a change at the stations of Halle (Saale) and Hanover. Since 30 May 1999, the "Harz three node model" (3-Knotenmodell Harz) has been in place, which allows cheap and convenient connections between the trains and the bus network in the towns of Quedlinburg, Halberstadt and Wernigerode under the regular interval timetable. A transfer of the node from Quedlinburg to Thale, as was planned in 2005, has now been rejected due to the need to provide interchange with the HSB. 1,000 to 2,000 people use rail services at Quedlinburg station (as of 2005).

==== Magdeburg–Thale ====
The Magdeburg–Thale railway is now considered to consist of three sections, which were historically built in two parts: the Magdeburg–Halberstadt section was opened on 15 July 1843 and was followed by the section to Thale in 1862. The maximum speed on the line reaches 100 km/h in sections and this is expected to be increased during the next few years to 120 km/h. Services on the Magdeburg–Thale line have been operated since 11 December 2005 for an initial twelve years by Transdev Sachsen-Anhalt under the name of HEX (Harz-Elbe-Express). LINT 41 and LINT 27 sets have been used. In the 2009/10 timetable there were hourly services towards Thale from 5:00 to 22:00 and after midnight and hourly services from 5:00 to 21:00 towards Magdeburg.

While the utilisation of the trains in the Thale-Quedlinburg area rose by 5 to 15 percent between 1998 and 2005, it remained about the same on the Quedlinburg–Halberstadt section.

The Harz-Berlin-Express (Berlin Ostbahnhof – Potsdam – Magdeburg – Thale) has offered a continuous connection for visitors from the Berlin area at the weekend since December 2005. Trains from Berlin Ostbahnhof via Halberstadt (where the train uncouples from the train towards Ilsenburg and Vienenburg) to Thale Hbf depart on Saturday and Sunday morning and Sunday evenings. On Friday, Saturday and Sunday evenings services run to Berlin. Between the Harz and Magdeburg, the trains operate under contract from the state of Saxony-Anhalt, closer to Berlin they are operated commercially by Transdev Sachsen-Anhalt. From 1997 to 2005, DB Regio operated a weekend excursion train between Berlin and the Harz region, which had been operating to Quedlinburg since 2002.

Since July 2009, greywacke from Rieder and gravel from the gravel deposit in Ditfurt has been loaded onto freight wagons at the newly built loading station in the Quedlinburg industrial estate on Magdeburger Straße. To do so, Mitteldeutsche Baustoffe GmbH built a new 2000 metre track parallel to the main line, allowing 590 metre-long trains to be handled.

==== Der Balkan ====
Der Balkan (the Balkans) was a nickname for the Frose–Quedlinburg railway, which was opened from Frose to Ballenstedt in 1868 and extended to Quedlinburg in 1885. The line was used by the Quedlinburg–Aschersleben service (formerly timetable route 332). The last rolling stock used on this branch line were the so-called piglet taxis. In order to increase its attractiveness, the timetable was changed in 2001, so that trains ran between Quedlinburg and Ballenstedt every hour and between Ballenstedt and Aschersleben every two hours. In 2003, a signal box fire in Ballenstedt Ost was used as an opportunity to stop operations initially between Gernrode and Ermsleben. This was followed by final service between Ermsleben to Frose on 13 December 2003 and finally the last train ran from Quedlinburg and Gernrode on 31 January 2004. The operation was replaced by the state bus route 318 (Quedlinburg–Ballenstedt–Aschersleben).

==== The Selke Valley Railway ====
Even before the suspension of traffic on the line to Frose, there were plans to extend the narrow-gauge Selke Valley Railway (Selketalbahn) from Gernrode to Quedlinburg to increase its attractiveness. Originally, the connection was to have been made by installing dual gauge track. After the closure of the standard-gauge line, these plans were abandoned and the Gernrode–Quedlinburg section was regauged. Due to the well-preserved embankment, the construction time was just under a year, with almost all level crossings modernised or replaced by automatic systems. Platform 3 has since then been used as the terminus of the Selke Valley Railway, which has a siding next to a bypass track to handle steam locomotives. In addition, a new water crane was installed at the end of the platform. There are several train journeys daily from Quedlinburg via Gernrode to Eisfelder Talmühle, two of them steam-hauled. Several special excursions have run directly to Brocken. Passenger traffic on the Selke Valley Railway has increased by 20% as a result of the extension to Quedlinburg.

==== Blankenburg–Quedlinburg railway ====
Quedlinburg station was served over the former branch line from Blankenburg via Timmenrode to Quedlinburg along with the branch line from Timmenrode to Thale Bodetal (opened 1907/1908) by passenger services only from April 1908 to June 1969. This line was known as Die Quäke (from quäkende—squawking, a reference to its train whistle). The fact that the track built by the Halberstadt-Blankenburger Eisenbahn (Halberstadt-Blankenburg Railway) was originally not planned can be recognised by the fact that another platform had to be built in Quedlinburg. Platform 1 West was built some distance behind the station building because a bypass track was necessary at the end of the track; a water crane was also installed shortly before the Stresemannstraße level crossing. This is the only evidence for the line that is still visible today. Parts of the line were shut down as they were severely damaged by the excessive loads on freight trains from Rübeland during the closure of the Halberstadt–Blankenburg railway. From 1975, the tracks were dismantled between Thale and Weddersleben; in the Quedlinburg area freight traffic was operated by the wagon factory (RAW) until 1993. The tracks were rebuilt in Quedlinburg from 2003 to 2005. The last remnants of its tracks in the station area disappeared with the rebuilding for the Harz Narrow Gauge Railways in 2005. Individual sidings are currently still found at the Albert-Schweitzer-Straße level crossing.

=== Regional services ===
For several years now, there has been a connection without change towards Potsdam and Berlin. In the 2019 timetable, Quedlinburg station was served by the following lines:

Line	Route	Interval (mins)
RE 11	Thale – Quedlinburg – Halberstadt – Oschersleben – Magdeburg	60
HBX	Thale – Quedlinburg – Halberstadt – Oschersleben – Magdeburg – Potsdam – Berlin	Fri-Sun
Selketalbahn	Quedlinburg – Bad Suderode – Gernrode – Alexisbad – Stiege – Eisfelder Talmühle	7 services/day

=== Buses ===
Local transport in the Harz district is operated by Harzer Verkehrsbetriebe. In the current timetable there are 11 routes from Quedlinburg. Destinations are Opperode (route 6), Thale (route 9, 10, 11), Blankenburg and Wernigerode (route 21), Heteborn and Gatersleben (route 23), Güntersberge (route 31), Harzgerode (route 32), Halberstadt (route 227) and Aschersleben via Ballenstedt (route 318). The Kreisverkehrsgesellschaft Salzland (Salzland District Transport Company, KVG) also operates buses to Aschersleben via Hoym (route 140).

Buses through the town of Quedlinburg serve the station five times a day from Monday to Friday.

The former four bus companies of the Harz district are now incorporated in the Verkehrs- und Tarifgemeinschaft Ostharz (Transport and Tariff Corporation of East Harz). A total of 143 routes start (as of 4 September 2014) on a school day from Quedlinburg bus station, which adjoins the station building to the southwest.

Long-distance bus operator, MeinFernbus Flixbus serves Quedlinburg on routes 051 and 129 several times a day.

=== Personal transport ===
For individual arrivals and departures, there is a short-term parking area in the station forecourt (Bahnhofsplatz) and, since 2006, a fee-based park and ride parking area on the grounds of the former freight yard. There are bus parking spaces available. The central taxi rank of the town is located on the station forecourt. "Bike-and-ride" places are available in sufficient numbers both at platform 1 and in the parking lot of the Harz Narrow Gauge Railway (HSB).

The station can be reached via the Quedlinburg town ring without having to cross the old town. The town has two entrances to expressways; B 6n is located four kilometres away and B 79 is three kilometres away.

== Other Quedlinburg stations and rail infrastructure ==
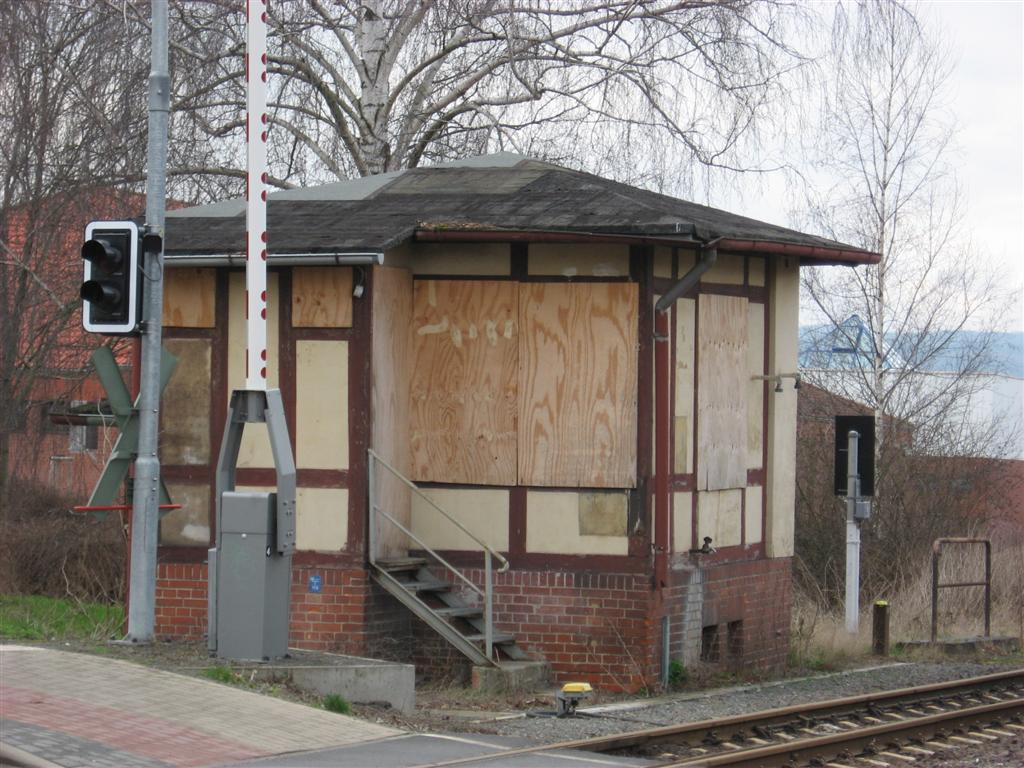
Former Quedlinburg-West signal box

=== Quedlinburg-West ===
Built from 1907 as a freight yard, Quedlinburg-West served briefly as a passenger station after the Second World War. It had a mainline track on the Quäke line and five local tracks, a turntable, a water crane and a locomotive shed. While the marshalling yard had been moved to the main station at Quedlinburg in the early 1950s, the sidings were used until 2003 for the wagon factory. After its closure, the tracks were dismantled.

=== Dippenword ===
The halt (Haltepunkt) of Dippenword was on the Quäke line. The name probably derives from the family name Dippe, who owned an orchard in this area. The halt was popular for day trippers to Altenburg (hill).

=== Maaßmühle ===
The halt of Maassmühle, also located on the Quäke line, was built only a few years after the opening of the line. It is named after a grain store, which was located directly next to the halt, and the oil mill of the Biehnert company.

=== Quedlinburg-Quarmbeck ===
The halt, located on the Frose–Quedlinburg railway directly next to state route 239 (Quedlinburg–Bad Suderode), was opened on 2 October 1936 under the name of Römergraben to serve the nearby airfield in Quarmbeck. Today there is an old shelter on the platform. The halt (a request stop on the Selke Valley Railway) is not connected by a footpath to the settlement of Quarmbeck, so pedestrians have to use the road for about 450 metres.

=== Quedlinburg wagon factory ===
The Quedlinburg wagon factory (Quedlinburger Waggonfabrik), founded in 1927 was south of the Bode and west of the former Schäferwiese ("shepherd meadow"). It had a connection to the Quäke at kilometre 16.20. Tanker and acid pot wagons were mainly repaired here, less frequently other freight wagons and also passenger carriages until the 1960s. More than 300 acid pot wagons were manufactured in Quedlinburg from 1936 to 1964. As an independent company, the factory had about 60 employees. The operation became part of the Einheit repair shop in Leipzig in 1971. There were no own locomotives for shunting on site, so they had to be requested when needed. Steam and diesel locomotives were used here until 1972, afterwards a Kö II locomotive was used until 1988 and a V 60 locomotive was used until its closure on 31 December 1993. After the suspension of passenger traffic on the Quäke, platform 1 West of the station was also used as a siding. But parts of the line to Weddersleben served as a shunting area. After its closure in late 1993, the buildings were offered for sale. Due to their dilapidated condition, parts of the roof collapsed on 6 April 6, 2004 and they were demolished in early 2005.

As a result of the uprising of des 17 June 1953 on 18 June 1953, the wagon factory workers went on strike and subsequently 22 people were arrested.
