= Thale Musestieg station =

Railway station in Germany

Thale Musestieg

General information
- Location: Musestieg 5; 06502 Thale; Saxony-Anhalt; Germany
- Coordinates: 51°45′05″N 11°02′49″E
- Owner: DB Netz
- Operator: DB Station&Service
- Lines: Magdeburg–Thale railway (KBS 315)
- Platforms: 1 side platform
- Tracks: 1
- Train operators: HarzElbeExpress

Other information
- Station code: 2459
- DS100 code: LTLM
- IBNR: 8013125
- Category: 7
- Website: www.bahnhof.de

History
- Opened: 18 December 2001; 24 years ago

Services
Preceding station	Abellio Rail Mitteldeutschland	Following station
Thale Hbf Terminus	RE 11	Neinstedt towards Magdeburg Hbf
Location
- Location within Saxony-Anhalt Location within Germany Location within Europe

Thale Musestieg station is a railway station in Thale, located in the Harz district in Saxony-Anhalt, Germany.
