= Blankenburg (Harz) station =

Railway station in Blankenburg, Germany

Coordinates: 51°47′43″N 10°57′44″E

Blankenburg (Harz)
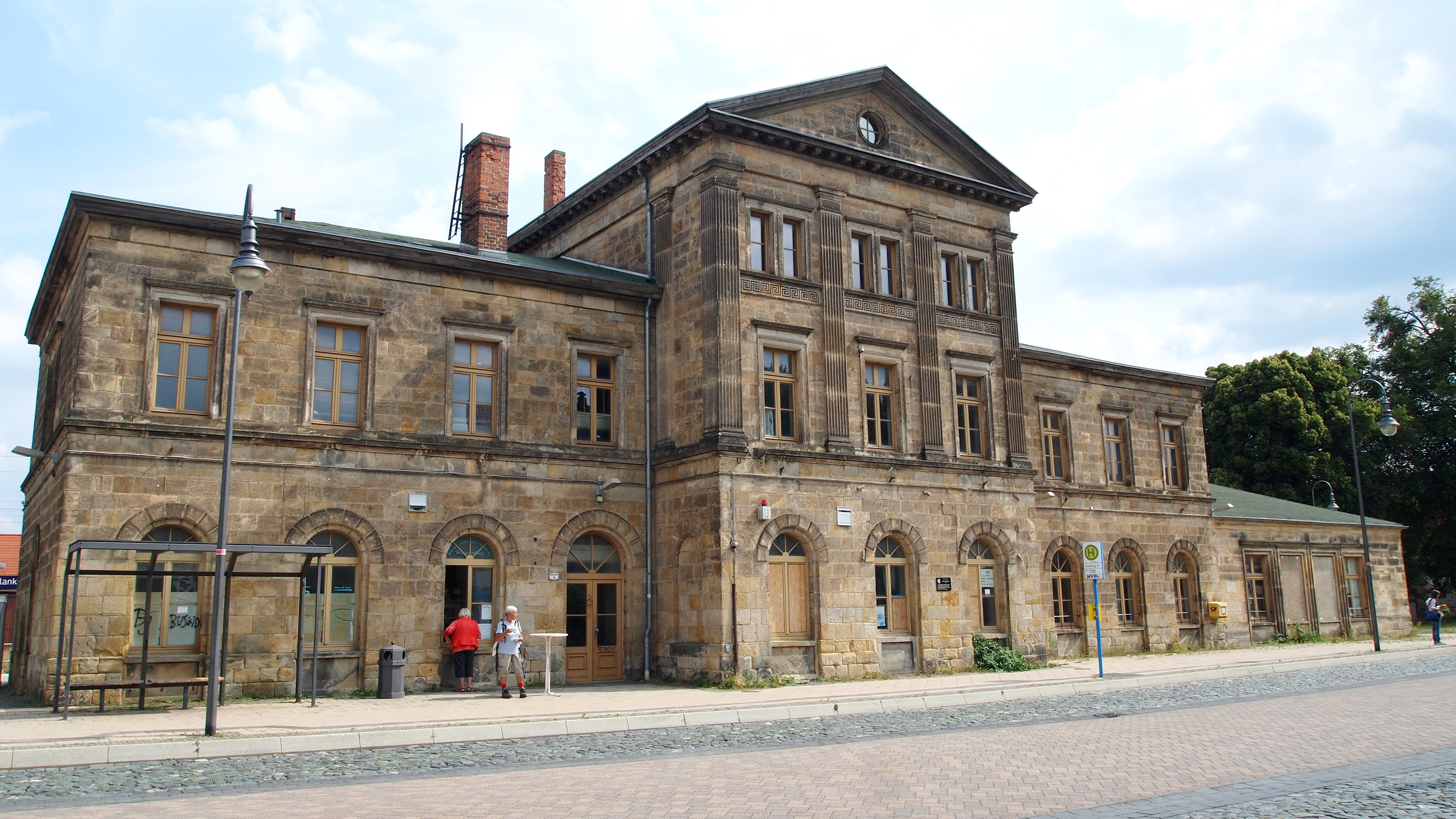
- 2013

General information
- Location: Bahnhofstraße 4; 38889 Blankenburg (Harz); Saxony-Anhalt, Germany
- Owner: Deutsche Bahn
- Operator: DB Station&Service
- Line: Halberstadt–Blankenburg (KBS 328)
- Connections: 230 232 250 257 261 263 431

Other information
- Station code: LBK
- Category: 5
- Website: www.bahnhof.de

History
- Opened: 31 March 1873

Services
Preceding station	Abellio Rail Mitteldeutschland	Following station
Terminus	RE 31	Börnecke (Harz) towards Magdeburg Hbf
Location

Blankenburg (Harz) station is the most important station in Blankenburg in the Saxony-Anhalt district of Harz in central Germany.

== Location ==
The station lies in the north of the town. Whilst this simplified its accessibility from Halberstadt to the north, it made a railway route into the Harz Mountains very costly.

== History ==
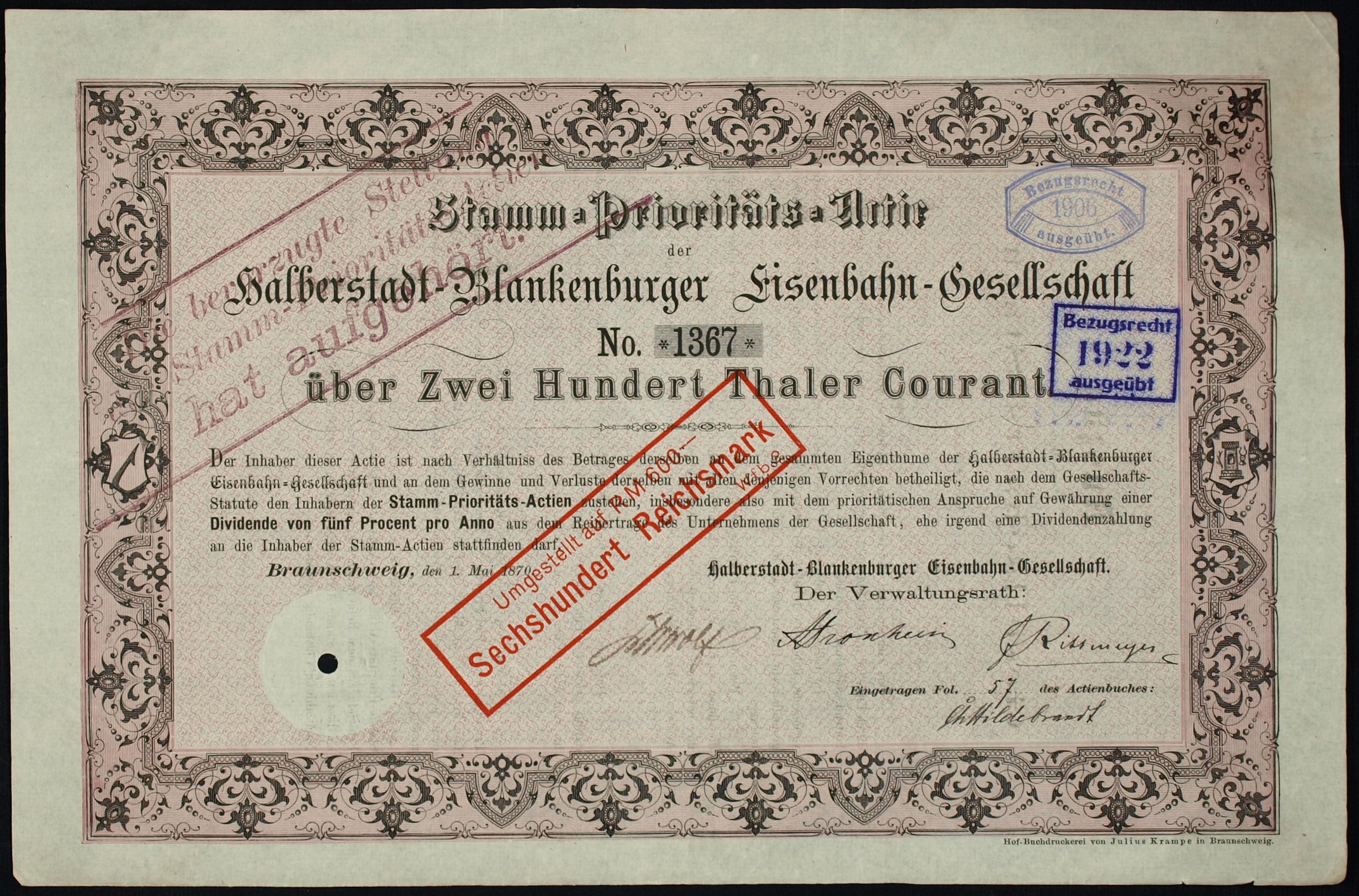
Share of the Halberstadt-Blankenburger Eisenbahn-Gesellschaft, issued 1. May 1870

Blankenburg station was opened on 31 March 1873 by the Halberstadt-Blankenburg Railway Company (Halberstadt-Blankenburger Eisenbahn-Gesellschaft or HBE). In its early years trains only ran to the station from Halberstadt. The main purpose of the line was to provide a connexion for the Blankenburg smelting works to the railway network.

On 3 July 1875 a 3.5 kilometre long line from Blankenburg station to the smelting works in the west of the town was completed. It was known as the Erzstufen Railway and was a cog railway using the Abt rack system. It was the oldest industrial siding in the Harz. But it was closed again in 1885 because, from 1880, the Blankenburg–Tanne line, also built by the HBE, provided a better link to the factory. For topographical reasons the line had to leave Blankenburg station in a northwesterly direction, thus resulting in a railway terminus. This line became the Harz Railway (Harzbahn) and since 1950 has been called the Rübeland Railway (Rübelandbahn).

From 1960 to 1965 the Rübeland Railway was electrified. Its electrification system is different from the normal systems. Because this line is isolated from the rest of the electrified railway network, a variation optimised for the railway was able to be chosen. For a long time, however, this required the employment of special locomotives of Class E 251, later the Class 171, that were maintained at the depot near the station in Blankenburg.

After the sections of the Rübeland Railway to Tanne and Königshütte were closed, in 2005 passenger services on the rest of the line to Elbingerode were ceased.

As well as Blankenburg station, that is mainly used for passenger services, Blankenburg also has a goods station and the North station, both responsible for marshalling trains for the Rübeland Railway.

== Operation ==
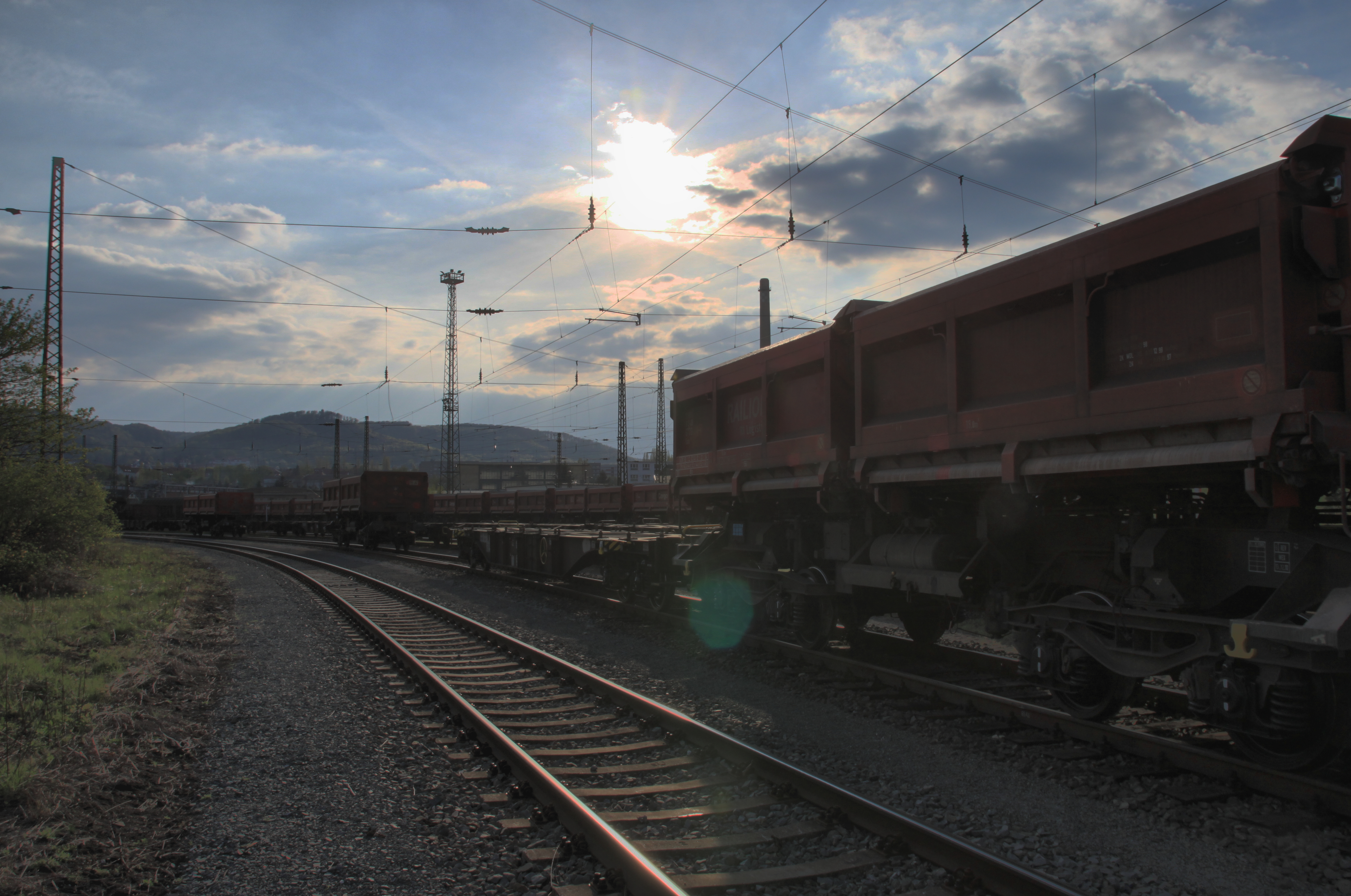
Blankenburg station sihouetted

Passenger services continue to be operated on the Halberstadt–Blankenburg railway, worked hourly by trains operated by Veolia Verkehr Sachsen-Anhalt.

Line	Route	Frequency
RE 31	Magdeburg – Halberstadt – Blankenburg	Hourly

Both lines are worked by goods trains. These trains use a bypass curve north of the station, so that no change of direction is needed.

== Sources ==
- Werner Steinke: Die Halberstadt-Blankenburger Eisenbahn. Berlin 1982, ISBN 3-87094-200-2.
- Gerhard Zieglgänsberger, Hans Röper, Werner Steinke: Eisenbahnreviere Harz. transpress 1992, ISBN 3-344-70738-8.
