= Halberstadt–Blankenburg railway =

Railway line in Germany

Overview
- Line number: 6866
- Locale: Saxony-Anhalt, Germany

Service
- Route number: 328

Technical
- Line length: 18.9 km (11.7 mi)
- Track gauge: 1,435 mm (4 ft 8 1/2 in) standard gauge
- Operating speed: 80 km/h (49.7 mph) (max)

The Halberstadt–Blankenburg railway is a non-electrified, single-track railway line, from Halberstadt via Langenstein and Börnecke to Blankenburg in the German state of Saxony-Anhalt. The Rübeland Railway connects to the line at Blankenburg (Harz) station. Until 1968, there was a branch to Derenburg. The branch line originally ran to Minsleben.

== History ==
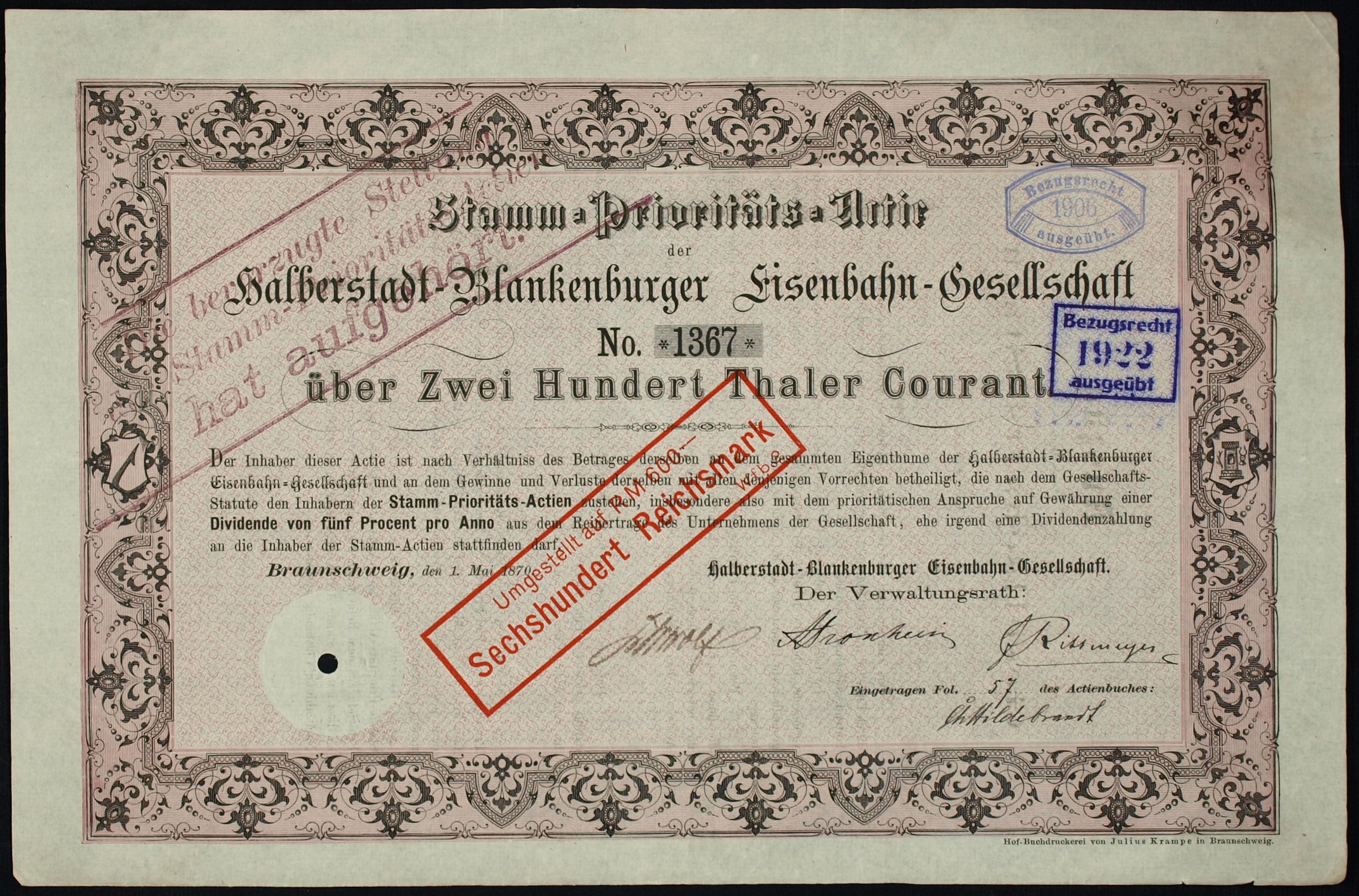
Share certificate of the Halberstadt-Blankenburger Eisenbahn-Gesellschaft of 1 May 1870

Construction for the first section of the Halberstadt-Blankenburg Railway (Halberstadt-Blankenburger Eisenbahn, HBE) started on 28 July 1870 and the line was opened on 31 March 1873. A siding to the Blankenburg iron works, which was about 3 km-long, was opened on 12 July 1875.

Since the operation as a main line incurred large operating expenses, the line was reclassified as a branch line in 1877. This allowed, among other things, numerous guards to be saved at level crossings.

== Operations ==
=== Freight operations ===
Freight traffic operates to the lime works over the Rübeland Railway. Until the power was removed from the Rübeland Railway’s overhead line in 2005, haulage of traffic in Blankenburg was changed from electric to Diesel locomotives, mostly of class 232 or class 241. These locomotives then took over the haulage to Halberstadt. To avoid the need to reverse in Blankenburg, a bypass curve exists north of the station.

=== Passenger services ===
Passenger services run on the line every hour. After 1989, class 202 locomotives were often used for hauling passenger trains. From 2000, passenger trains from Halberstadt connected with services to Elbingerode on the Rübeland Railway, which ended in 2005. There were operated by push-pull trains, hauled by Class 218 diesel locomotives. Connex Sachsen Anhalt, now called Transdev Sachsen-Anhalt, took over operations in 2005. Alstom Coradia LINT diesel multiple units have since been used.

== Peculiarity ==
A special feature of the line is that there are two level crossings with the tracks of the Halberstadt tramway.
