= Thale Hauptbahnhof =

Railway station in Thale, Saxony-Anhalt, Germany

Thale Hbf
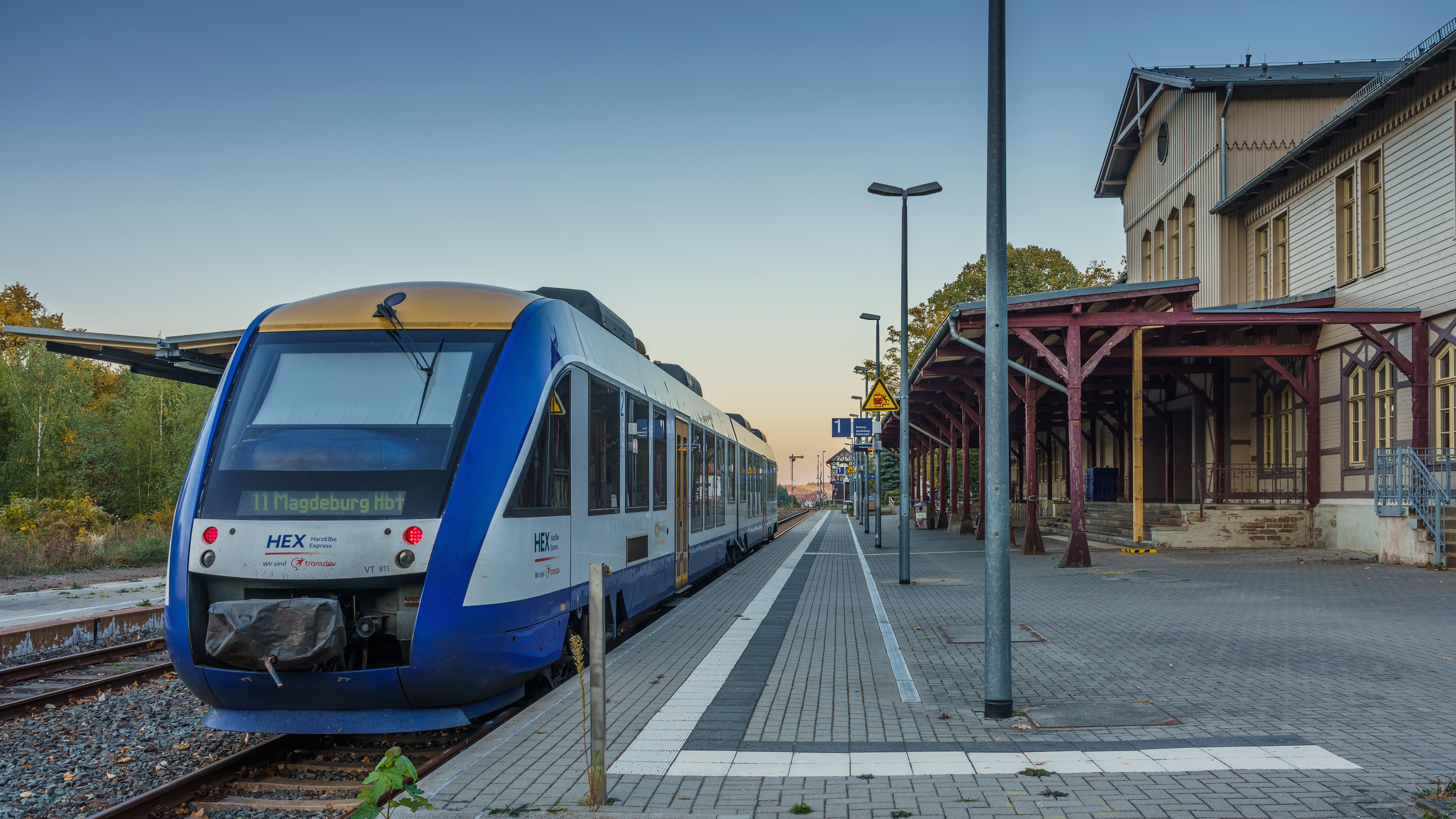

General information
- Location: Bahnhofstraße 6; 06502 Thale; Saxony-Anhalt, Germany
- Coordinates: 51°44′45″N 11°01′52″E
- Elevation: 173 m (568 ft)
- Owner: Deutsche Bahn
- Operator: DB Station&Service
- Lines: Magdeburg–Thale (KBS 315)
- Platforms: 3
- Train operators: Abellio Rail Mitteldeutschland

Construction
- Accessible: Yes

Other information
- Station code: 6184
- DS100 code: LTL
- IBNR: 8013112
- Category: 5
- Website: www.bahnhof.de

History
- Opened: 1862; 164 years ago

Services
Preceding station	Abellio Rail Mitteldeutschland	Following station
Terminus	Harz-Berlin-Express	Thale Musestieg towards Berlin Ostbahnhof
Terminus	RE 11	Thale Musestieg towards Magdeburg Hbf
Location

Thale Hauptbahnhof is a station on the Magdeburg–Thale railway in the town of Thale in the German state of Saxony-Anhalt. The station is classified by Deutsche Bahn as a category 5 station. The only other station in Thale is the stop at Thale Musestieg, although there used to be three stations in Thale on a branch of the Blankenburg–Quedlinburg railway, which was opened in 1908 and was closed in the 1960s.

== History ==
The station was opened in 1862. At first it was called Thale station, but in 1907 it was renamed Thale Hauptbahnhof to distinguish it from the nearby Thale Bodethal station on the Blankenburg–Quedlinburg railway.

Until 2003 there was a turntable at the end of the station. Thale originally had three platforms. Today only one platform is used. Formerly, when locomotives were repositioned from one end of the train to the other, it was necessary to close the two crossings near the station. Today, however, the line is only operated with diesel multiple units.

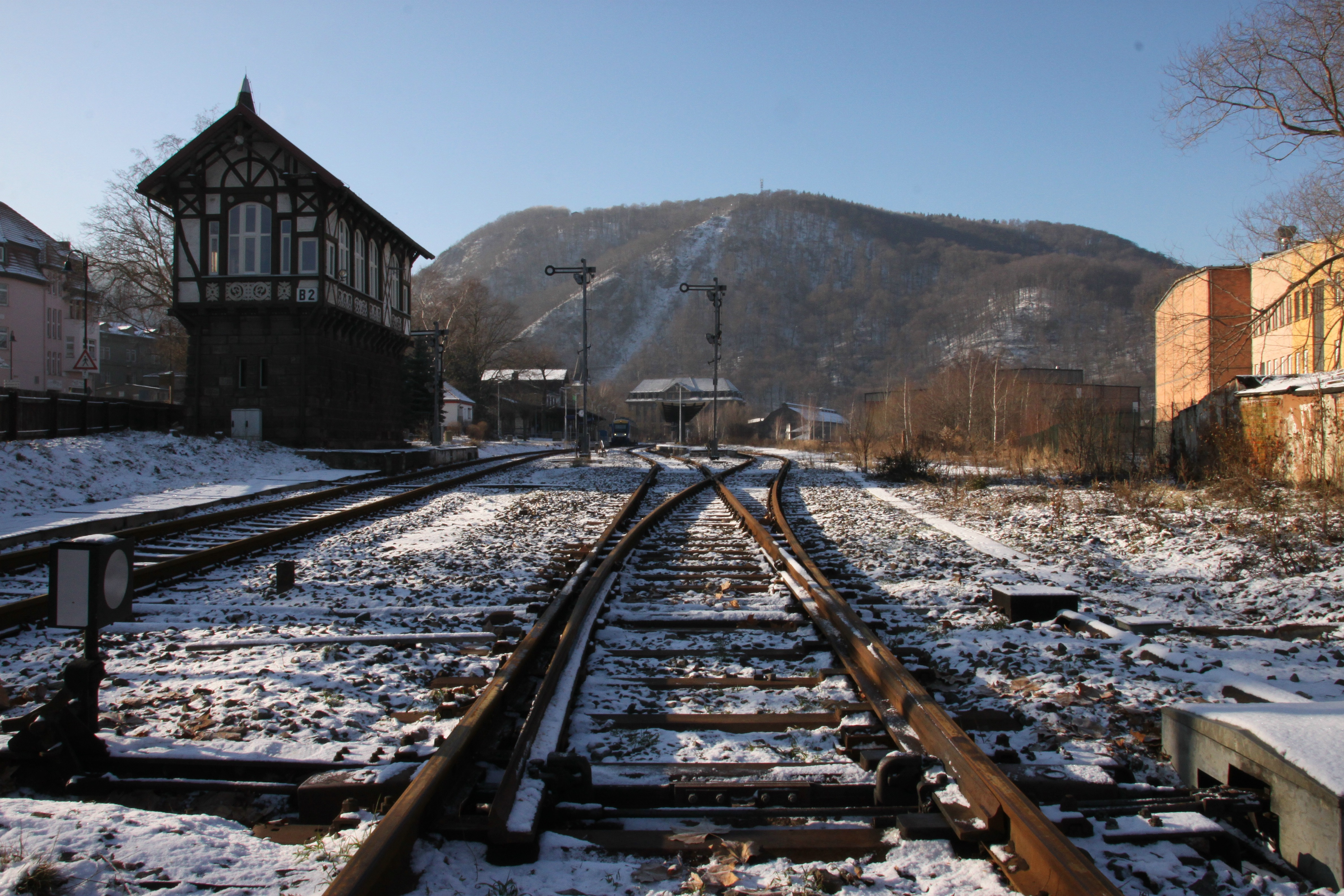
Tracks of Thale station

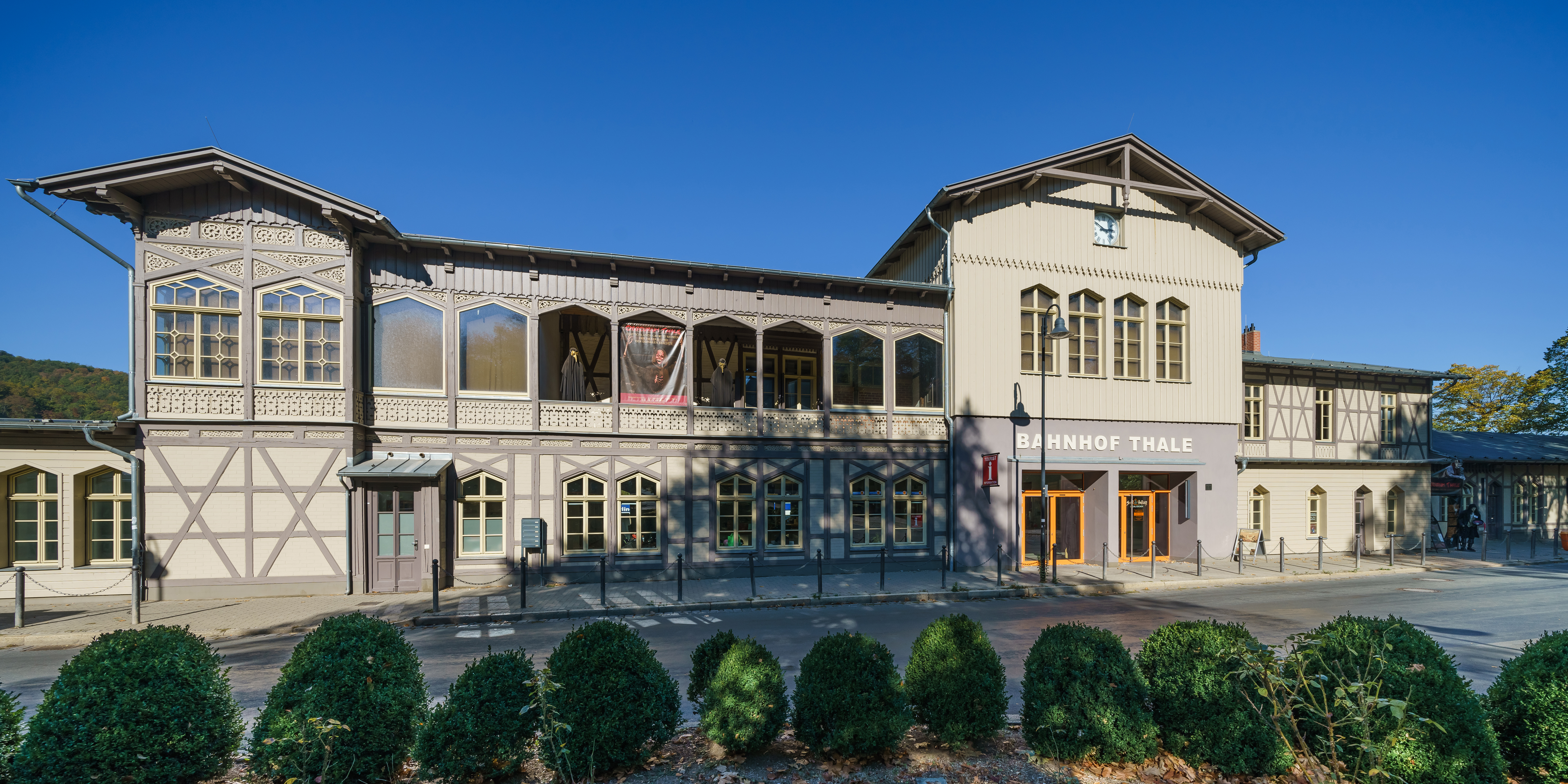
Station building

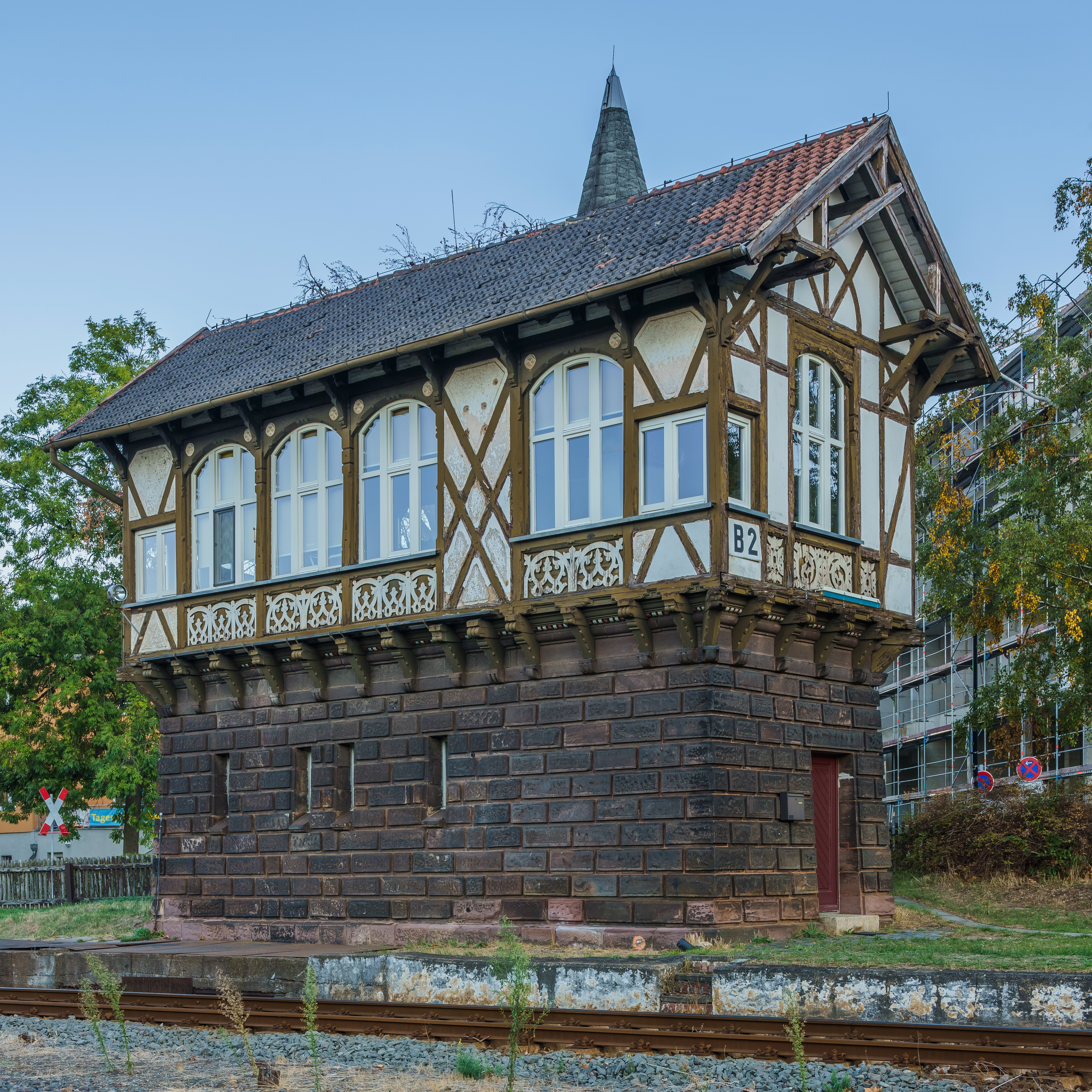
Timber-framed signal box

== Rolling stock ==
The Harz-Elbe-Express runs with Alstom Coradia LINT diesel multiple units (LINT 27 and LINT 41 classes). The line is not electrified.

== Rail services ==
The station is served hourly by the Harz-Elbe-Express. On weekends the Harz-Berlin-Express runs without a change of trains to/from Berlin Ostbahnhof, operating on Fridays to Sundays from Thale to Berlin once a day and from Berlin to Thale once on Saturdays and twice on Sundays.

Line	Route	Frequency
RE 11	Magdeburg Hbf – Halberstadt – Quedlinburg – Thale Hbf	60 min
HBX	Berlin Ostbahnhof – Burg (b Magdeburg) – Magdeburg Hbf – Halberstadt – Quedlinburg – Thale Hbf	Some services, Fri–Sun
