= Transdev Sachsen-Anhalt =

Railway company

- Company type: GmbH
- Industry: Railway company
- Headquarters: Halberstadt, Saxony-Anhalt, Germany
- Area served: North Harz region
- Key people: Matthias Löser, Dirk Bartels
- Products: Passenger transport, Services
- Owner: Transdev Germany (100%)
- Number of employees: 97 employees including 3 trainees
- Website: HarzElbeExpress

Transdev Sachsen-Anhalt (formerly: Veolia Verkehr Sachsen-Anhalt) is a regional railway company, a subsidiary of Transdev Germany. It provided passenger services on the North Harz network from 2005 to 2018 under the name HEX (HarzElbeExpress).

== History ==
Connex Sachsen-Anhalt GmbH was founded on 1 July 2004 with its headquarters in Halberstadt, after the responsibility for the public transport services of the North Harz Network (Nordharz-Netz) was transferred to Connex Regiobahn in the preceding March by the state of Saxony-Anhalt. On 11 December 2005 the Harz-Elbe Express began operations and in 2006 was followed by the takeover of the Klesener bus service, which then continued to be operated under the name SalzlandBus. In February 2009 the bus service was sold.

Also in 2006, following in the footsteps of its parent company, the firm was renamed from Connex Sachsen-Anhalt GmbH to Veolia Verkehr Sachsen-Anhalt GmbH. On 1 April 2008 the KBS 525 line from Leipzig to Geithain was added to the network, and was taken over by Connex Sachsen following a competition. In December 2008, leadership of the operation went to the newly founded Mitteldeutsche Regiobahn, a brand of Veolia Verkehr Regio Ost.

With the December 2018 timetable change, Abellio Rail Mitteldeutschland replaced Transdev Sachsen-Anhalt as the operator of services on the North Harz network.

=== Incidents ===
On 29 January 2011 there was a train collision with ten dead on the Magdeburg–Thale railway, when a goods train and a HEX local passenger train collided near Oschersleben-Hordorf.

== Network ==
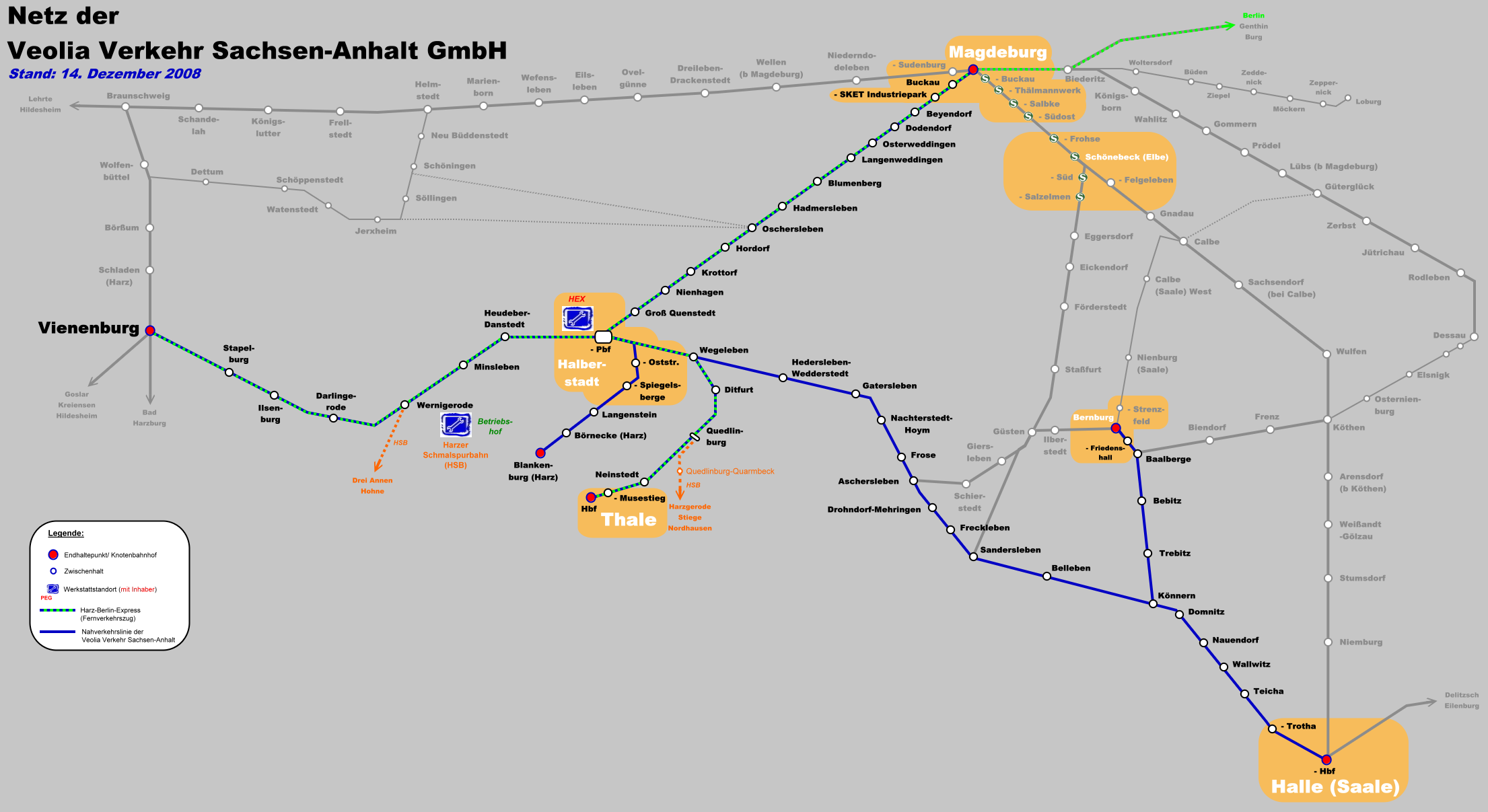
The network

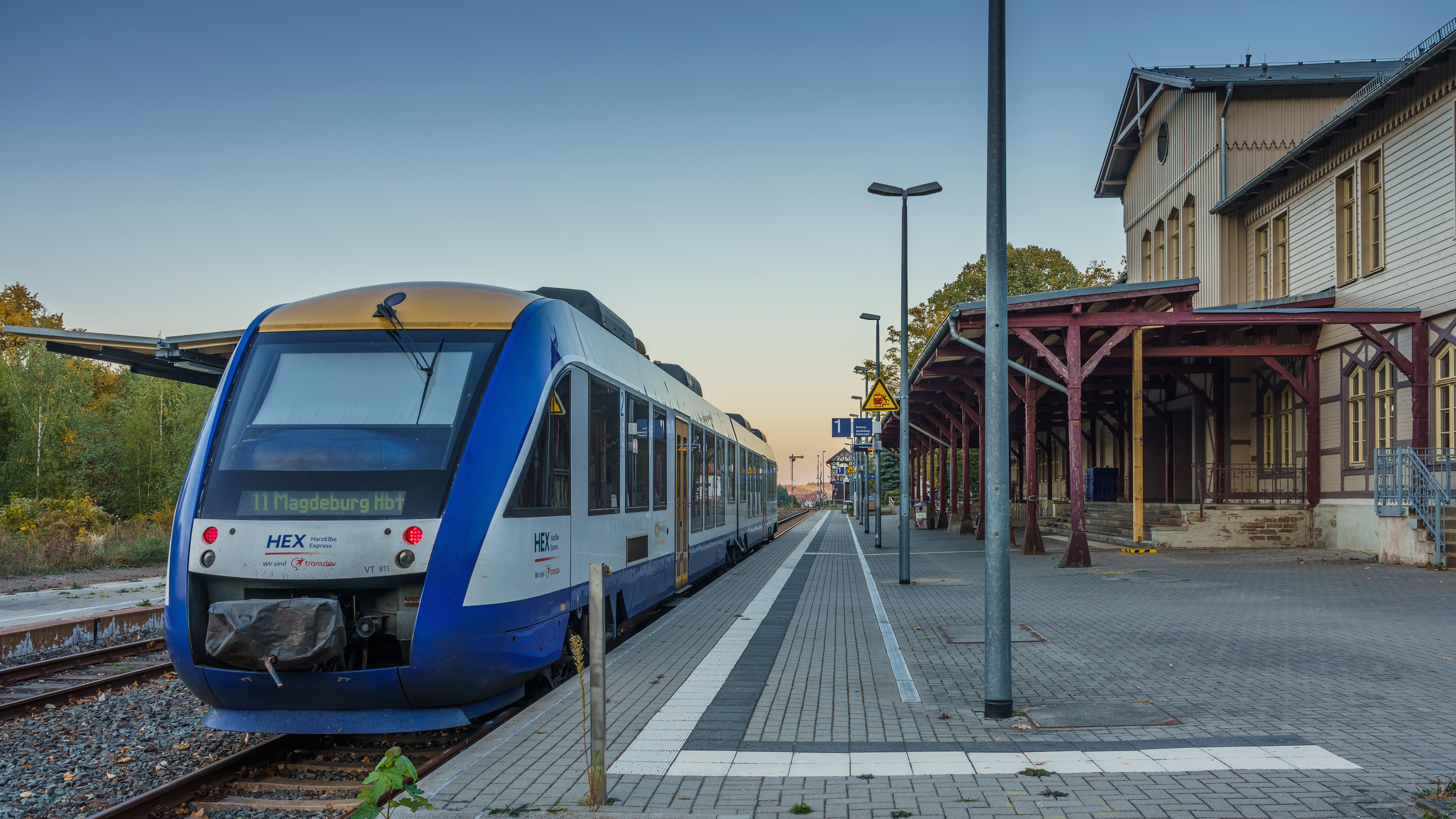
Transdev train in Thale

The Harz-Elbe Express ran on the following routes:

Name	No.	Route	Frequency	Contract period
RE 5	315	Thale – Quedlinburg – Halberstadt – Magdeburg	60 min	December 2005 – December 2017
RB 47	330	Bernburg – Könnern – Halle (Saale)	120 min	December 2005 – December 2017
RB 60	315	Halberstadt – Oschersleben (Bode) – Magdeburg	120 min	December 2005 – December 2017
RB 65	330	(Magdeburg –) Halberstadt – Wernigerode – Vienenburg (– Goslar)	120 min	December 2005 – December 2017
RB 67	328	(Magdeburg –) Halberstadt – Blankenburg (Harz)	60 min	Dezember 2005 – Dezember 2017
RB 70	330	Halberstadt – Aschersleben – Könnern – Halle (Saale)	120 min	Dezember 2005 – Dezember 2017

This network represented 11 percent of the entire railway network in the state of Saxony-Anhalt.

=== Names ===
Since 11 December 2005 a total of eleven units have been christened with names of regional note. They are named after:

- Halberstadt, the cathedral town
- the legendary Thale
- the old castle of Langenstein
- the flower town of Blankenburg (Harz)
- THW Halberstadt
- the Wernigerode Brocken Express
- the Saale valley
- the 2010 State Garden Show at Aschersleben (Landesgartenschau Aschersleben 2010)
- Halle Zoo
- Georg Friedrich Händel (badly damaged in the train accident at Hordorf and subsequently scrapped)
- the Bode Gorge (Bodetal). The legendary Harz.
