= Frose–Quedlinburg railway =

Railway line in Germany

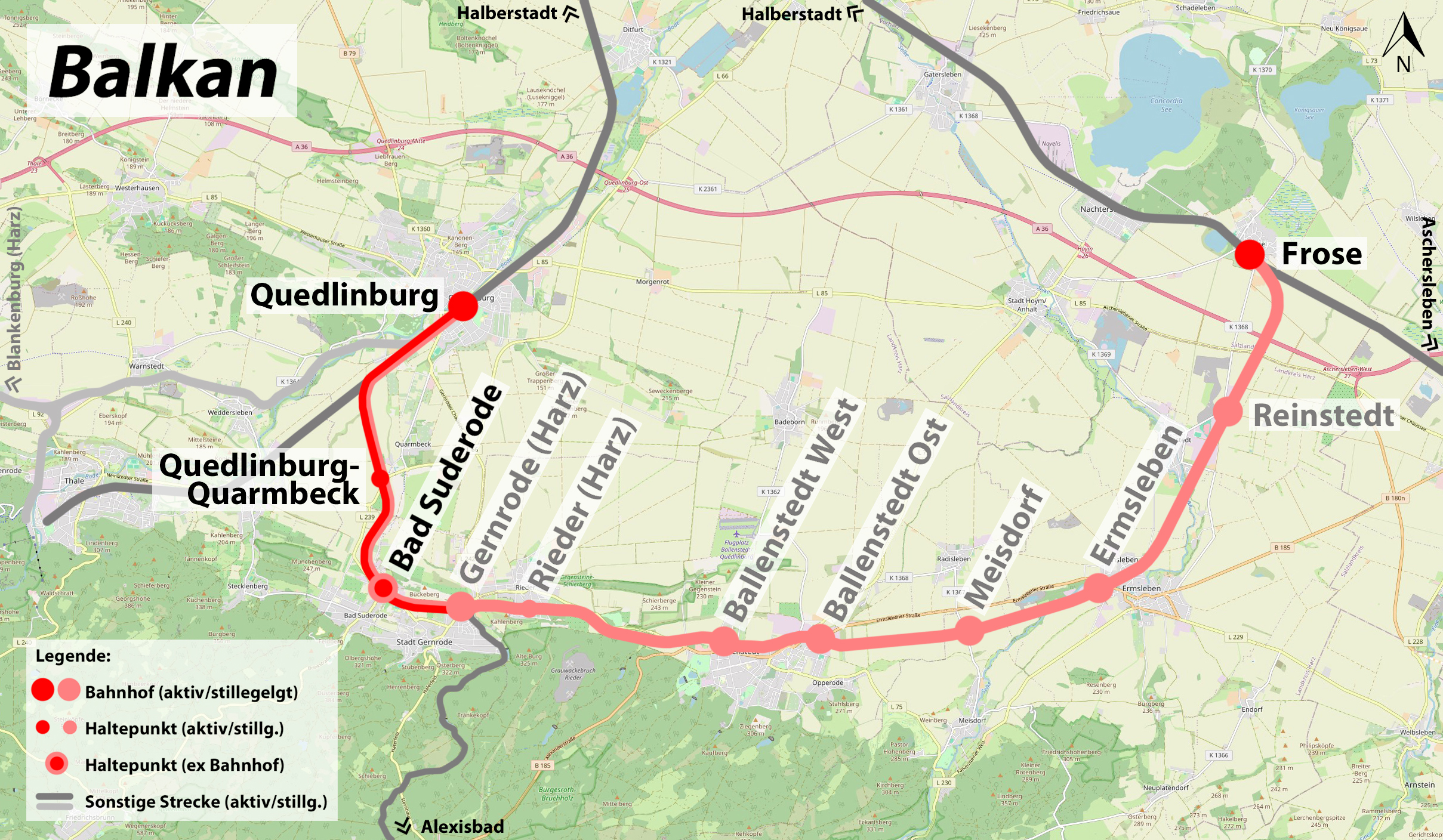

Overview
- Line number: 6862
- Locale: Saxony-Anhalt, Germany

Service
- Route number: 332 (2004)

Technical
- Line length: 30.2 km (18.8 mi)
- Track gauge: 1,435 mm (4 ft 8 1/2 in) standard gauge; 1,000 mm (3 ft 3 3/8 in) metre gauge Gernrode–Quedlinburg since 2006

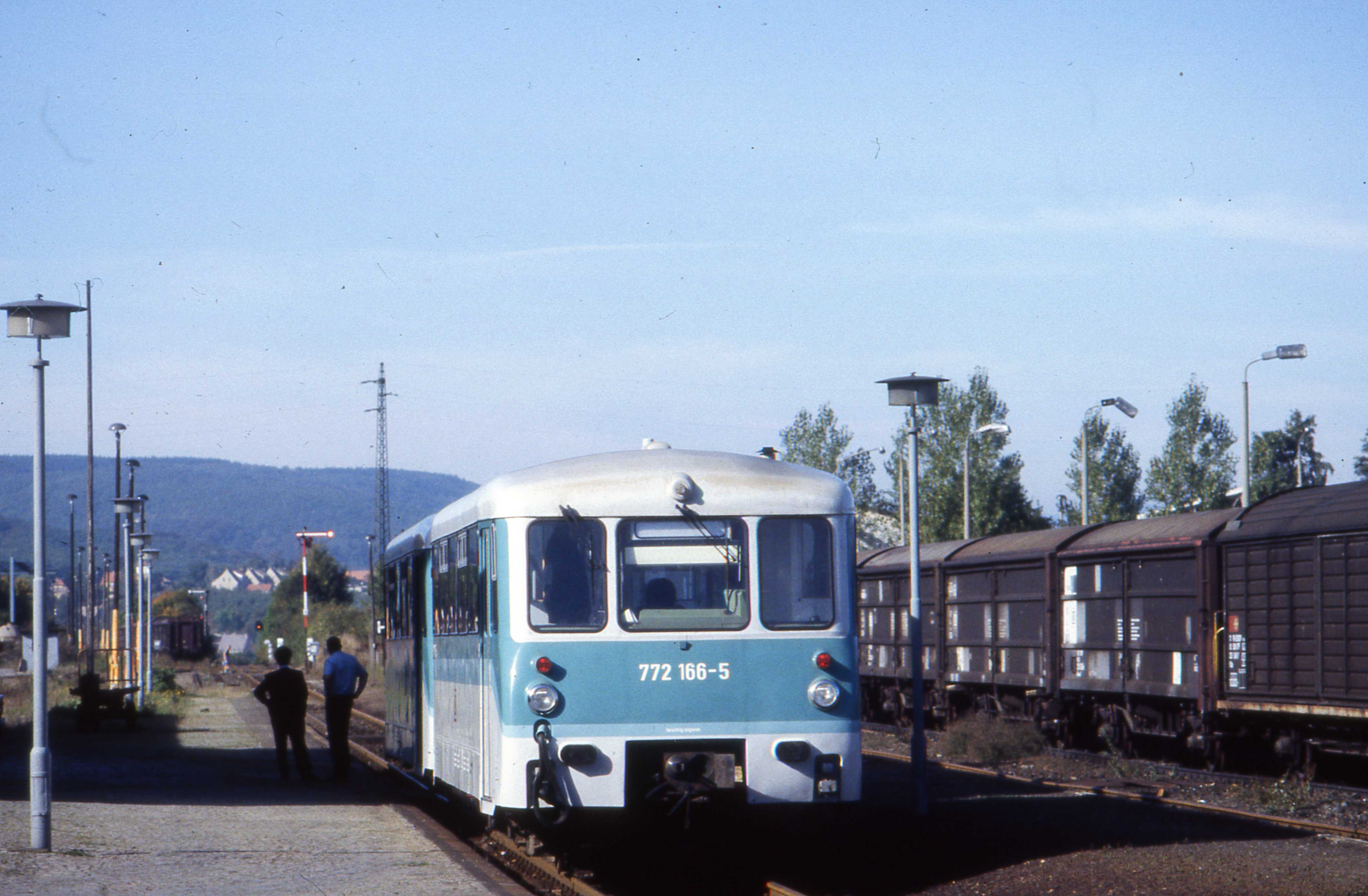
So-called Ferkeltaxe ("piglet taxis") in Gernrode station (looling towards Quedlinburg)

The Frose–Quedlinburg railway, also called the Balkan ("Balkans") locally, was a standard gauge branch line on the northern rim of the Harz Mountains in the German state of Saxony-Anhalt. The line runs from Frose via Gernrode to Quedlinburg. It was closed in 2004. The Gernrode–Quedlinburg section was subsequently converted by the Harz Narrow Gauge Railway Company to metre gauge. Since 26 June 2006 the line has been re-opened as part of the Selke Valley Railway.

== History ==
On 28 July 1864 the Magdeburg–Halberstadt Railway Company (Magdeburg-Halberstädter Eisenbahngesellschaft, MHE) received the approval of the Duchy of Anhalt to buy the Cöthen-Bernburg Railway (Cöthen-Bernburger Eisenbahn) and the concession to build the Halberstadt–Aschersleben–Bernburg–Halle line. The terms of the concession included the requirement to build a branch line from Frose to Ballenstedt to the summer residence of the dukes of Anhalt.

In 1865, work began on the line from Frose to Ballenstedt, which were, however, soon delayed because the Austro-Prussian War in 1866. The line from Frose to Ballenstedt Schloß (Ballenstedt Castle station, later renamed Ballenstedt West) was formally opened on 7 January 1868.

The line was classified as a Nebenbahn (branch line) in 1878. The extension to Quedlinburg was opened on 1 July 1885. As a result of the building of the line, plans for the development of railways in the eastern Harz could be realised some years earlier than would have been otherwise possible. In 1887, the narrow-gauge Selke Valley Railway (Selketalbahn) was put into operation; this connected Gernrode to the standard gauge line from Frose. Because of the tight curve radii, Rollbock or transporter wagons could not be used on the narrow gauge railway and freight had to be reloaded in Gernrode.

=== Since the Second World War ===
The Frose–Quedlinburg line was also affected in 1951 by orders to canabalise track superstructure for the Berlin outer ring (Berliner Außenring). In addition to the dismantling of sidings, the existing S49 profile rails were replaced by weaker S33 profile rails, some taken from the partly closed Windberg Railway (Windbergbahn) in Saxony. As a result, the allowable axle weights and the line speed had to be reduced, resulting in extended travel times.

Freight traffic was discontinued in sections. No freight trains ran between Gernrode and Frose from 1 January 1998 and between Quedlinburg and Gernrode from 10 June 2001. The route was used for regular rail passenger services until 2003. The 2003 annual timetable listed a total of eight daily train pairs on the Quedlinburg–Aschersleben route under KBS 332: Quedlinburg–Gernrode–Aschersleben. This route required these trains to reverse in Frose station. Other trains on weekdays provided extra services between Quedlinburg and Ballenstedt Ost to provide hourly services.

The Ballenstedt Ost signal box was severely damaged by arson on 28 June 2003. Deutsche Bahn made no attempt to repair it, despite requests from the affected districts. Instead, rail replacement buses were operated between Ermsleben and Gernrode. At the same time, preparations began for the closure of the line. Operations between Aschersleben and Ermsleben was discontinued after 13 December 2003 and the last train ran between Gernrode and Quedlinburg on 31 January 2004. Traffic on the railway line between Quedlinburg and Aschersleben was formally abandoned by the state on 31 December 2004, while the parallel bus service had been increased in the meantime.

The Federal Railway Authority (Eisenbahnbundesamt) approved the closure of the Frose–Gernrode section on 15 June 2004 and it was formalised on 31 July 2004. At some level crossings (including on the L85, at the Roseburg and most recently in June 2012 in Ballenstedt and Ermsleben), the rails have been removed and the crossings has been paved. Almost all tracks between Gernrode and Ballenstedt were removed in 2016. There is a plan to build a bike path along the route.

=== Conversion of the Quedlinburg–Gernrode section ===
Since 1990 there had been plans to install dual gauge track between Gernrode and Quedlinburg, which however failed for a long time due to the lack of financial support from the state and Deutsche Bahn. After the Harz Narrow Gauge Railway bought this section of the line, it established its own financing for the conversion of the line to metre gauge and the renovation of all level crossings. The state of Saxony-Anhalt provided funds worth a total of €6.5 million for the project. The construction began on 18 April 2005.

The converted track was approved for use by the railway supervisory authority of Saxony-Anhalt on 17 February 2006. It was opened on 4 March 2006 with a festive event with special trains. Since various remaining works had to be carried out, only a few special trains operated until the start of scheduled passenger traffic on 26 June 2006.

The 2017 timetable shows six pairs of trains a day between Gernrode and Quedlinburg, two of which are hauled by locomotives.

== Name ==
The line was popularly called the Balkan, apparently a modification of Balkan Express, a name used mockingly for several railway lines in Germany.

== Stations ==
=== Bad Suderode ===
The airfield of Quarmbeck, which had been used since 1927, was rebuilt in 1934 as the German Air Force base of Römergraben. A three-kilometre connecting track was built from Bad Suderode station. This ran parallel to the track to Quedlinburg until shortly before the halt of Quedlinburg-Quarmbeck, where it curved to the right to the barracks area.

=== Quedlinburg-Quarmbeck ===
The halt, located next to state route 239 (Quedlinburg–Bad Suderode), was opened on 2 October 1936 under the name of Römergraben.

=== Quedlinburg ===
Quedlinburg station was opened in 1863 as a through station. Its track 3 had, before the conversion to metre-gauge, a connection towards Halberstadt. A bypass track now allows locomotives to run around. The Blankenburg–Quedlinburg railway (known as the Quäke) operated passenger services from track 1 West from 1908 to 1969 via Thale-Bodetal to Blankenburg (Harz).

== Sources ==
- Dirk Endisch: Der "Balkan" – Die Nebenbahn Frose-Gernrode-Quedlinburg. Dirk Endisch, Leonberg-Höfingen 2004, ISBN 978-3-936893-21-2
- Josef Högemann (December 2007), Eisenbahnchronik Harz - Die Geschichte der Eisenbahnen im Harz (in German), EK-Verlag GmbH, ISBN 3-88255-722-2
- Schmalspurig nach Quedlinburg. In: Eisenbahn-Revue International. Ed. 4/2006, ISSN 1421-2811, p. 197.
