= Georg Zacharias Platner =

German entrepreneur and politician (1779–1862)

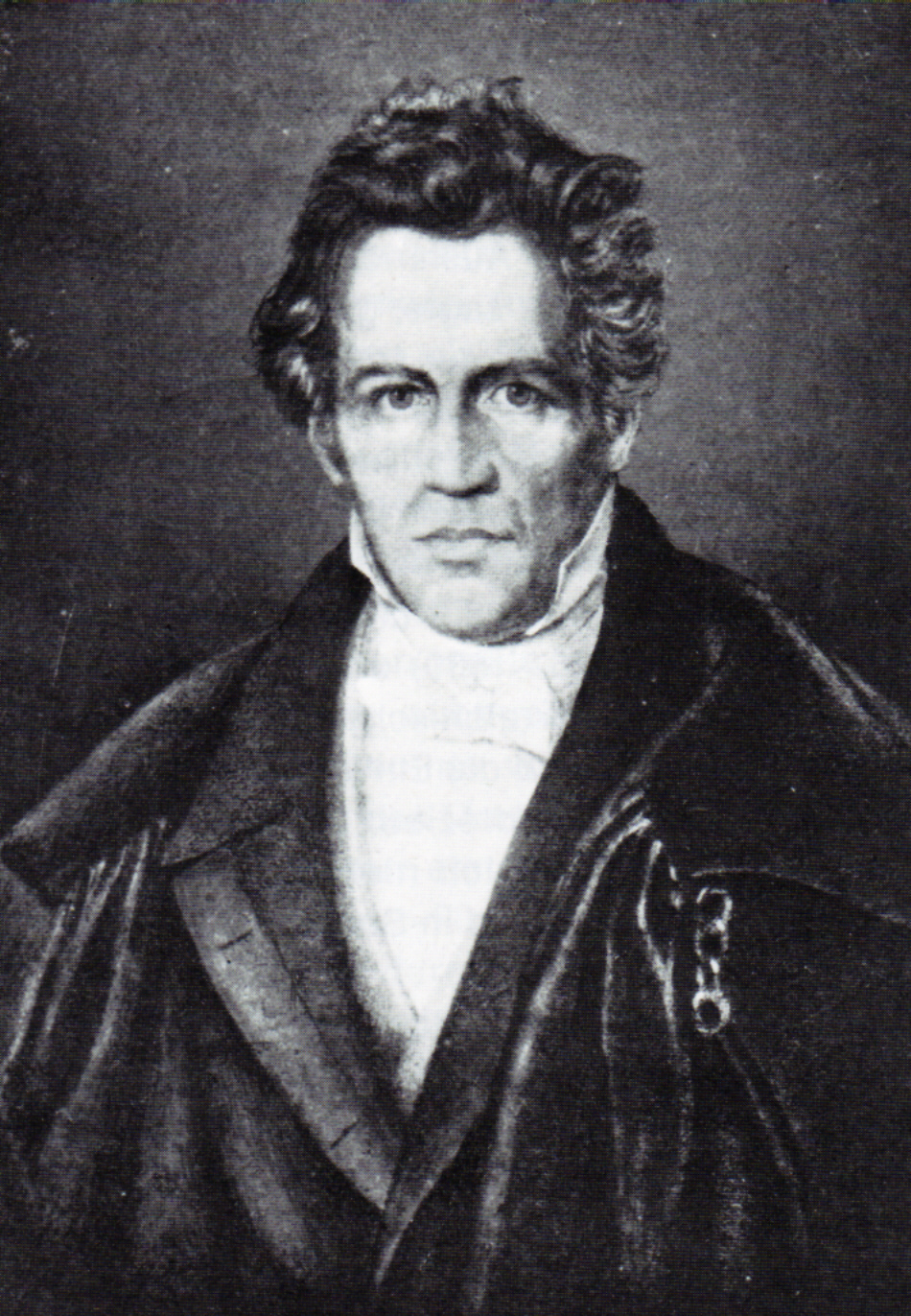
- Georg Zacharias Platner 1781-1862
- Born: 27 July 1781; Free imperial city of Nuremberg, Franconian Circle
- Died: 8 July 1862 (aged 80); Nuremberg, Bavaria, German Confederation
- Occupations: Businessman-entrepreneur; Railway pioneer
- Spouse: Maria Katharina Elise Cramer
- Children: Georg; Albert
- Parent(s): Anton Lorenz Platner; Anna Susanna Köhler

Georg Zacharias Platner (27 July 1781 - 8 July 1862) was a German manufacturer-entrepreneur and an astute businessman who later also became a politician.

His principal claim to fame arises on account of his role as instigator and founder of the Bavarian Ludwig Railway ("Bayerische Ludwigseisenbahn") which opened at the end of 1835. It connected Fürth with Nuremberg, a distance of 6 kilometers, by means of the first regular steam-hauled railway service in Germany.

== Life ==
=== Provenance and early years ===
Georg Zacharias Platner was born in Nuremberg. Despite being in Bavaria, Nuremberg was for historical reasons a predominantly Protestant city and the Platners were a Protestant family, originally from Chemnitz. Anton Lorenz Platner, his father, was a successful wholesaler-merchant.

=== Business career ===
After receiving basic schooling he joined his father's colonial goods merchandising business as an apprentice. When he was 16 he was sent to work with "Rochet und Ryhiner", a trading business in Basel, between 1797 and 1799, and then between 1799 and 1801 he worked "Taner et Cie.", a French trading house operating out of Hamburg. By 1801 he was well travelled and, through his experience, qualified to join the family business. When his father died in 1811, Georg Zacharias took control, in 1815 opening subsidiary businesses in Rotterdam and Hamburg. During the first part of the century the economy had been adversely impacted by the so-called Continental System, part of a long-running trade war and leading to a mutual economic blockade between Britain and the European continent, and the Platner business which had hitherto conducted a highly profitable trade in indigo, was obliged to diversify, with the focus switching to tobacco trading. His aunt's husband, Georg Zacharias Lotzbeck, died in 1829 and Platner incorporated his late uncle's tobacco processing factory into his business conglomerate, though he later transferred this asset to his sons-in-law.

In 1846 he handed over his other business interests to his sons, Georg and Albert.

=== Public career ===
As early as 1810 Georg Zacharias Platner played his part in public service. He represented the Nuremberg "Kaufmannschaft" (loosely: "chamber of commerce") to the king in Munich where, after Ludwig I came to the throne in 1825, Platner was valued as an advisor on trade and tariff policies. He served as a deputy in the second chamber of the Bavarian parliament between 1831 and 1834. In the parliament he was noted as a passionate backer of free trade. He held various local government positions in Nuremberg, and during the middle 1820s, together with Johannes Scharrer, represented his city as a negotiator in the talks when led to the creation in 1828 of the South German Customs Union.

== Bavarian Ludwig Railway ==
Through his involvement in indigo and tobacco trading, Platner had close business links to England. He followed the developments of railways there with particular interest. He knew all about the success of the Liverpool and Manchester Railway which had opened in 1830, and kept himself briefed on the accompanying technical developments. Bavarian Parliament had identified the route from Fürth to Nuremberg as suitable for an equivalent Bavarian project, but there was an overwhelming determination that government money should not be provided for the investment. Platner, who was wealthy and had an extensive network of contacts in the business community, now took the initiative, on 14 May 1833 launching an invitation to investors to participate in the establishment of a company to build and operate the "Eagle Line" ("Adlerstrecke"). Investor reaction was positive and the "Ludwigs-Eisenbahn-Gesellschaft-Nürnberg" (railway company) was launched on 21 November 1833. The largest shareholder, with a holding of 21,000 guilders (nominal "par" value), was Platner, who was elected as the company's treasurer and director in chief at the November inaugural meeting, with Johannes Scharrer, the son of a small-scale artisan-brewer and a highly successful "self-made businessman", as his deputy.

Platner prepared to attract his railway investors with a strategic approach which could be considered modern. Market research was undertaken whereby a local wood-worker was tasked with counting how many people and how much merchandise traveled between the end points of the proposed railway line. He then used the resulting data to prepare cash forecasts from which he could provide projected profitability figures.

Although his first achievement involved securing the necessary finance, Platner also played a key role in the construction of the company's major assets. He personally ordered the rails from the Remy Brothers' Iron works in Neuwied, where the steel masters had prudently obtained technical information on rail manufacturing from England several years earlier. A steam locomotive was also needed. Various German and Belgian manufacturers were approached, but it became apparent that their offers were costly and in some cases based on untried technology, and in the end the company's first locomotive was purchased from George Stephenson in Newcastle, England. The locomotive was shipped from Newcastle to Rotterdam and then by barge upriver as far as Cologne, after which a recent drop in water levels meant that plans for onward shipment to Offenbach am Main were aborted and the heavy locomotive had to be transported overland for final assembly onsite. By the time it was received in Nuremberg towards the end of October 1835, the price of the Stephenson locomotive had increased, but the directors had been able to use their contacts in Munich to negotiate an exemption from import tax on it. Stephenson had resolutely refused to deviate from his preferred track gauge with the result that one side of the railway line, which had already been laid down, had to be relayed slightly more than half an inch further from the other rail than previously, in order to provide for compatibility with the "Adler" (locomotive).

On 13 July 1835 King Ludwig agreed to the company using the name "Ludwigseisenbahn" (Ludwig Railway). The line from Nürnberg to Fürth was opened on 7 December 1835.

As part of the deal with George Stephenson, the steam locomotive that the company purchased arrived accompanied by William Wilson who was an experienced locomotive driver-engineer. Wilson was able to observe the final assembly of the locomotive after the cart loads of sub assemblies and components had been delivered overland from the docks at Cologne; he then drove the train on its inaugural run. The original plan seems to have been for Wilson to return to England after a year or so, but became something of a local celebrity, and despite attempts by other companies to lure him away he renewed his contract several times and stayed with the company. He caught a bad chill in 1842 from which he never fully recovered, but nevertheless continued to work as a locomotive driver until forced to retire in 1859 by a further deterioration in his health. He lived in Nuremberg until he died there in 1862. Several sources note that in 1836, while Georg Zacharias Platner was serving as the company's principal director, the train driver William Wilson was earning an annual salary of 1,500 guilders while Platner earned only 1,200 guilders. Wilson's contract, dated 5 August 1836 also provided that his monthly salary of 125 guilders would be supplemented by a further payment of 240 guilders every time he successfully completed the training of an apprentice driver to the required standard. Wilson's salary was reduced to 1,200 guilders in 1850, but the differential with the salary of the best paid director remained, the director earning 900 guilders, reflecting the general economic downturn that followed 1848.

== City parks ==
Georg Zacharias Platner became known for his contribution to the greening of Nuremberg. Between 1818 and 1921 he laid out what is today the "Bucher Straße" (literally "Books Street") in connection with improvement of his own private garden which was adjacent to it. He was also the owner of the land known as "Platnersanlage" ("Platner's Park"), landscaped as a garden accessible for the public. What is today known as "Colleggarten" ("College Garden") can be traced back to Platner's proviate garden, along with the green spaces of the Friedrich Ebert Platz. Platner also paid for the transformation of the "Judenbühl" into a fashionable "English-style" landscaped park-garden, which for many years, known as the Maxfeld, was used for exhibitions and celebrations, and which formed the basis for today's Stadtpark ("City Park"). Platner was also involved in the beautification of the "Dutzendteich-Park" ("Park of the twelve ponds").
