= William Wilson (engineer) =

British mechanical engineer (1809–1862)

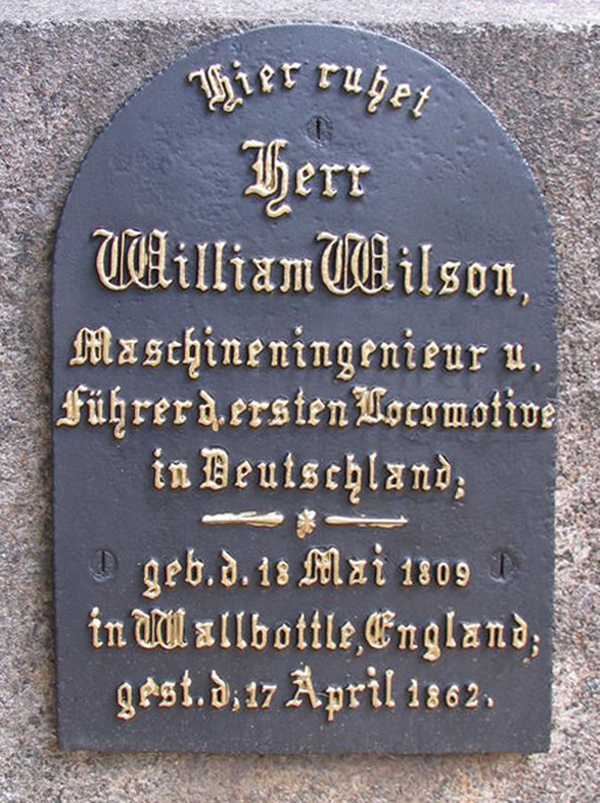
Plaque on Wilson's grave in Nuremberg, Germany.

William Wilson (1809 – 1862) was an English mechanical engineer and first engine driver on the first German railway.

== Life ==
William Wilson was born on 18 May 1809 in Walbottle, Northumberland, England, and in 1829 was engaged by George Stephenson as a mechanic.

The first railway line in Germany was opened on 7 December 1835 between Nuremberg and Fürth. Its first steam locomotive was supplied by Stephenson, because at that time there were no suitable and affordable steam engines available in Germany. At the request of the Ludwig Railway Company (Ludwigs-Eisenbahn-Gesellschaft), Stephenson also provided Wilson to act as engine driver and engineer. He was to instruct the locomotive crew and train successors, for which he was given an eight-month contract. Stephenson stipulated a maximum working period of 12 hours per day and Wilson's travel costs were borne by the Ludwig Railway Company. In addition, he took on the fitting out, and later the direction, of a railway workshop. He was given a high salary commensurate with his qualification that exceeded the income of the general manager (Generaldirektor) of the railway company. His pay was initially 1,500 gulden per annum; in addition he received a bonus of 240 gulden.

On 7 December 1835 William Wilson finally drove the locomotive, Adler, as the engine driver, on the first German railway on the newly built line operated by the Ludwig Railway. After eight months he made no arrangements to leave. Both as a result of his safe performance during this journey as well as his excellent credentials, his contract was repeatedly extended. The passengers wanted to travel with no one else but the "tall Englishman". Whenever he was not driving the locomotive himself, income fell.

From 1842 he alternated as engine driver with his assistant, Bockmüller. His health was seriously damaged by his occupation, however, because he would stand on the driver's platform in all weathers in a gentleman's overcoat and top hat, but without any protection from the elements. Not until the winter of 1845/46 were engine drivers given leather coats as protection against the weather. Finally, eight years later, the engines were furnished with protective roofs over the driver's stand. In spite of tempting offers by the Bavarian State Railway, Wilson remained with the Ludwig Railway. In 1859, he was unable to work regularly as a result of his worsening health. At the 25th anniversary celebrations of the Ludwig Railway he was greatly honoured. He died on 17 April 1862 in Nuremberg as a result of his illness. He was buried at St. John's Cemetery in Nuremberg, his funeral being attended by a large section of the population. His grave is still visible today.

== Literature ==
- Jürgen Franzke (2000), Michael Diefenbacher, Rudolf Endres (ed.), Wilson, William, Nuremberg City Lexicon (Stadtlexikon Nürnberg) (in German) (2nd, revised ed.), Nuremberg: W. Tümmels Verlag, pp. 1183, ISBN 3-921590-69-8
