= Paul Camille von Denis =

German businessman (1796–1872)

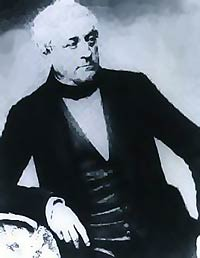
Paul Camille von Denis.

Paul Camille Denis, later von Denis, (28 June 1796 – 3 September 1872) was an engineer, railway pioneer and participant in the Hambach Festival, the German political protest of 1832.

Denis was born at Château des Salles in Montier-en-Der, in the Département of Haute-Marne, France. He grew up as a child of the Mainz city councillor, Peter Denis, and attended the Lycée Louis-le-Grand in Paris. In 1814 and 1815 he studied at the École Polytechnique in Paris. After the conclusion of his studies he returned to the Palatinate to his father who had since settled at Neustadt.

Initially employed as a trainee by the Bavarian state - to which the Palatinate then belonged - from 3 March 1816 he worked as a construction overseer (Baukondukteur) in Germersheim. In 1822 he became an engineering inspector at Speyer and, in 1826, was promoted to engineer, first class, at Zweibrücken.

Here he came into close contact with the democratic opposition organised by Friedrich Schüler, Johann Georg August Wirth, Joseph Savoye and Ferdinand Geib. In a report from the state police to the Bavarian king he was described - incorrectly - as their boyhood friend and fellow student. The German Press and Fatherland Union (Deutscher Preß- und Vaterlandsverein) of democrats was founded in 1832, in which the wealthy Paul Camille Denis was a major financial contributor. In his personal files for that year his wealth was stated at 300,000 Gulden. When in August 1832 the secretary of the Preß- und Vaterlandsverein, Georg Eifler, was arrested, Paul Camille Denis put up 10,000 Gulden as bail.

As a member of the Palatine state parliament he took part in the Hambach Festival. As a result, the Bavarian General Commissioner, Field Marshal Carl Philipp von Wrede, transferred him to Rosenheim for exceeding his authority. On 1 August 1832 Paul Camille Denis signed the Kaiserslautern Protest against the Federal resolution of 28 June. This led to a charge of "denigration of the most high state authorities". Denis reacted to the charge and threatened transfer to the Isar area by taking unpaid leave on 7 November 1832 for a "technical training trip" to England and America.

On his return he built the first German railway line, the Bavarian Ludwig Railway between Nuremberg and Fürth which opened in 1835. This was followed by the construction of the Taunus Railway from Frankfurt am Main to Wiesbaden, opened in 1839-1840, and the Palatine Ludwig Railway in 1844–1849. Recognised as an expert in railway building he later took responsibility for the construction of the Palatine Maximilian Railway, the Homburg – Zweibrücken railway (1857), later part of the Schwarzbachtalbahn (Pfalz) and the Bliestalbahn, as well as the Bavarian Eastern Railway Company from 1856 to 1861.

Now highly respected, he received the Knight's Cross of Philip the Magnanimous in 1852 from Grand Duke Ludwig III of Hesse and Rhine. In the same year he was raised to the peerage by the Bavarian king, Maximilian II, becoming Paul Camille von Denis.

In 1865 Paul Camille von Denis became the head of the planning commission for the Rhine bridge on the Mannheim–Ludwigshafen railway and shortly thereafter, in 1866, went into retirement of his own volition. He died in Bad Dürkheim and was buried in the family grave at the Helenen cemetery in Strasbourg.

== Sources ==
Wolfgang Kunz, Paul Camille von Denis - ein Lebensbild, in: Jahrbuch für Eisenbahngeschichte 21 (1989), S. 5 - 14.
