= Bavarian gulden =

Currency of Bavaria until 1873

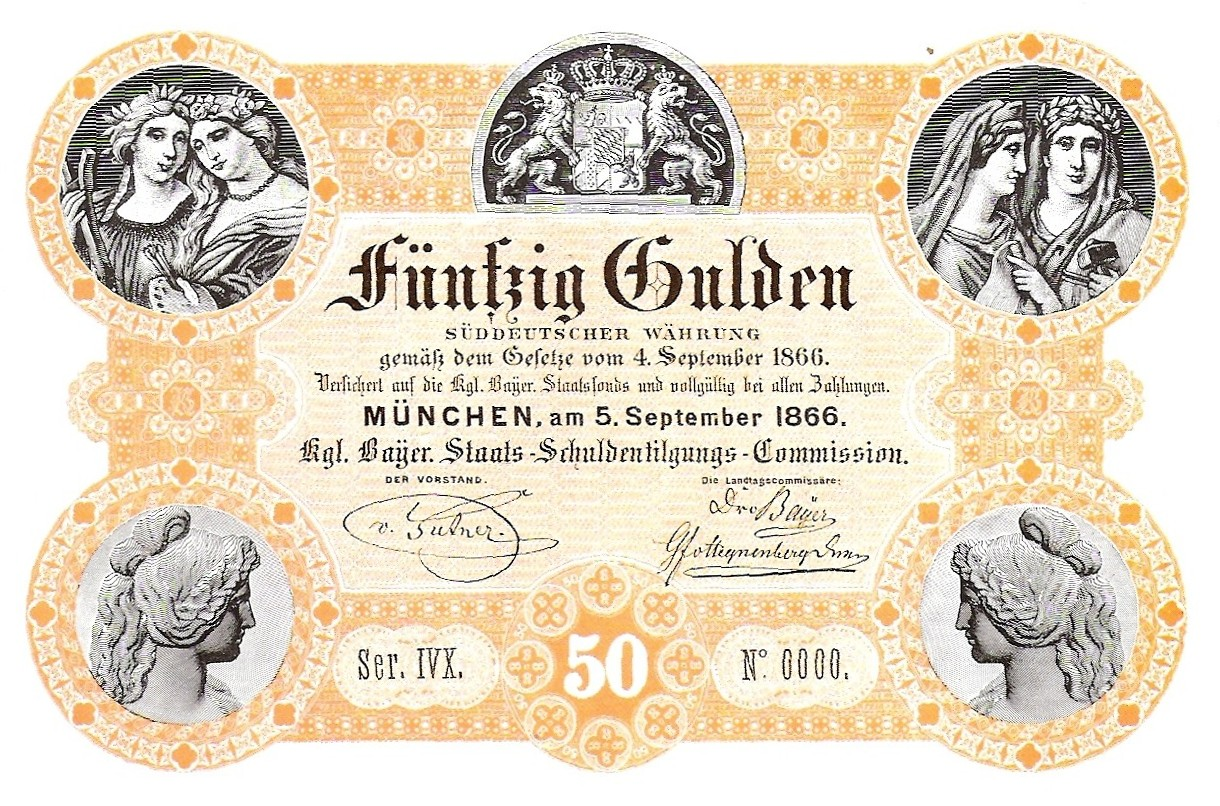
50-gulden note (dated 1866)

Bavaria used the South German gulden (also called 'Florin') as its currency until 1873. Between 1754 and 1837 it was a unit of account, worth 5/12 of a Conventionsthaler, used to denominate banknotes but not issued as a coin. The Gulden was worth 50 Conventionskreuzer or 60 Kreuzer Landmünze.

The first Gulden coins were issued in 1837, when Bavaria entered into the South German Monetary Union, setting the Gulden equal to four sevenths of a Prussian Thaler. The Gulden was subdivided into 60 Kreuzer. In 1857, the Gulden was set equal to four sevenths of a Vereinsthaler.

The Gulden was replaced by the Mark at a rate of 1 Mark = 35 Kreuzer.
