= Bavarian Ludwig Railway =

First steam-hauled railway in Germany (commenced service 1835)

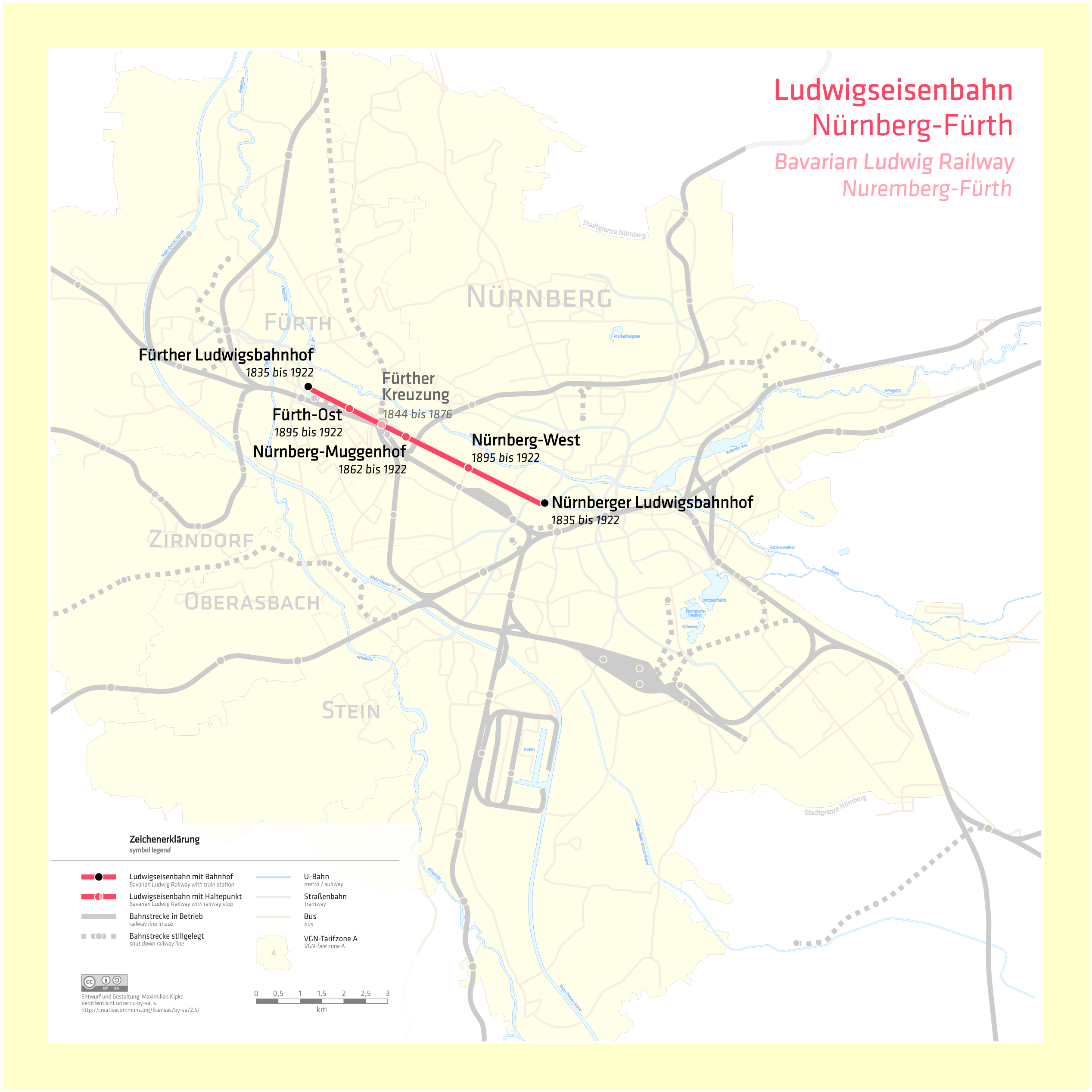
Route of Ludwig Railway

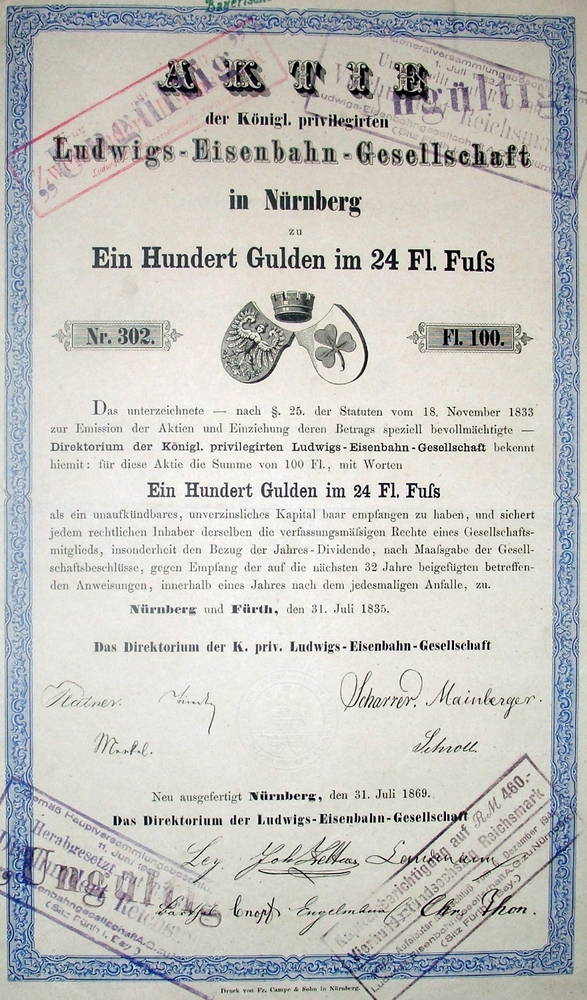
Bayerische Ludwigs Bahn 1835/69 share certificate.

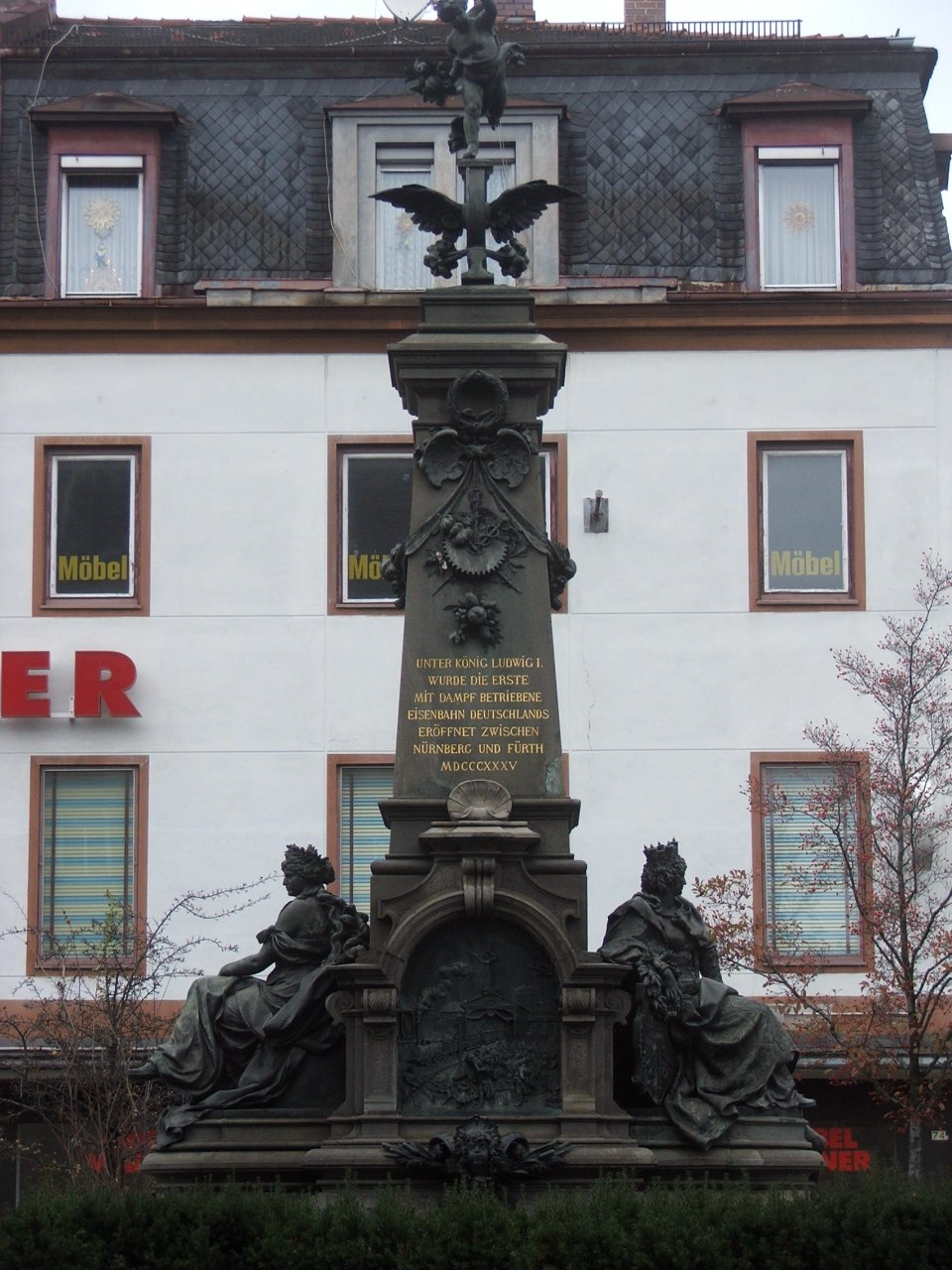
Railway monument in Nuremberg in memory of the first German railway, Nürnberg-Fürth.

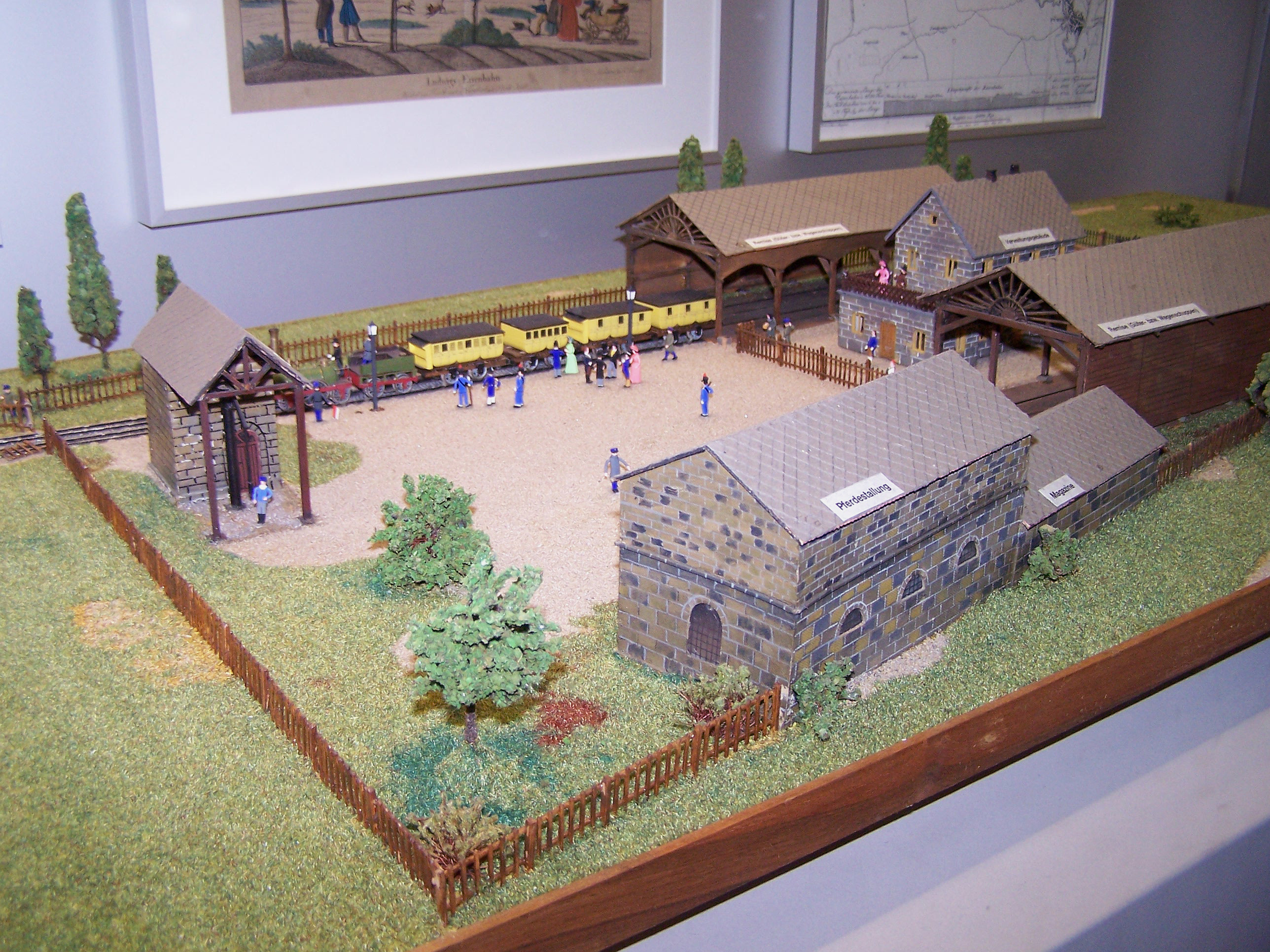
Model of the first Nuremberg station of 1835 in the Nuremberg Transport Museum

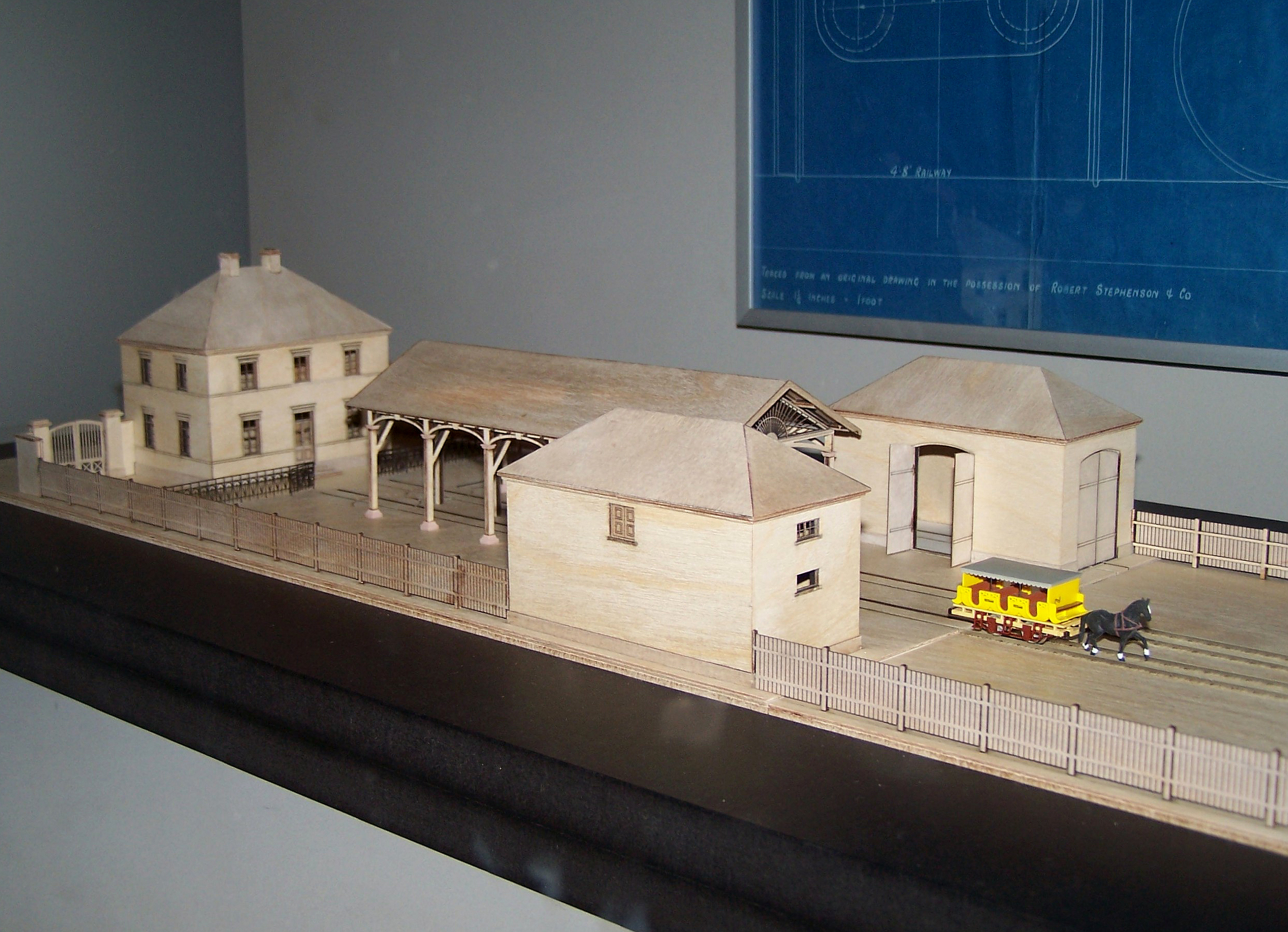
Model of the first Fürth station of 1835 in the Nuremberg Transport Museum

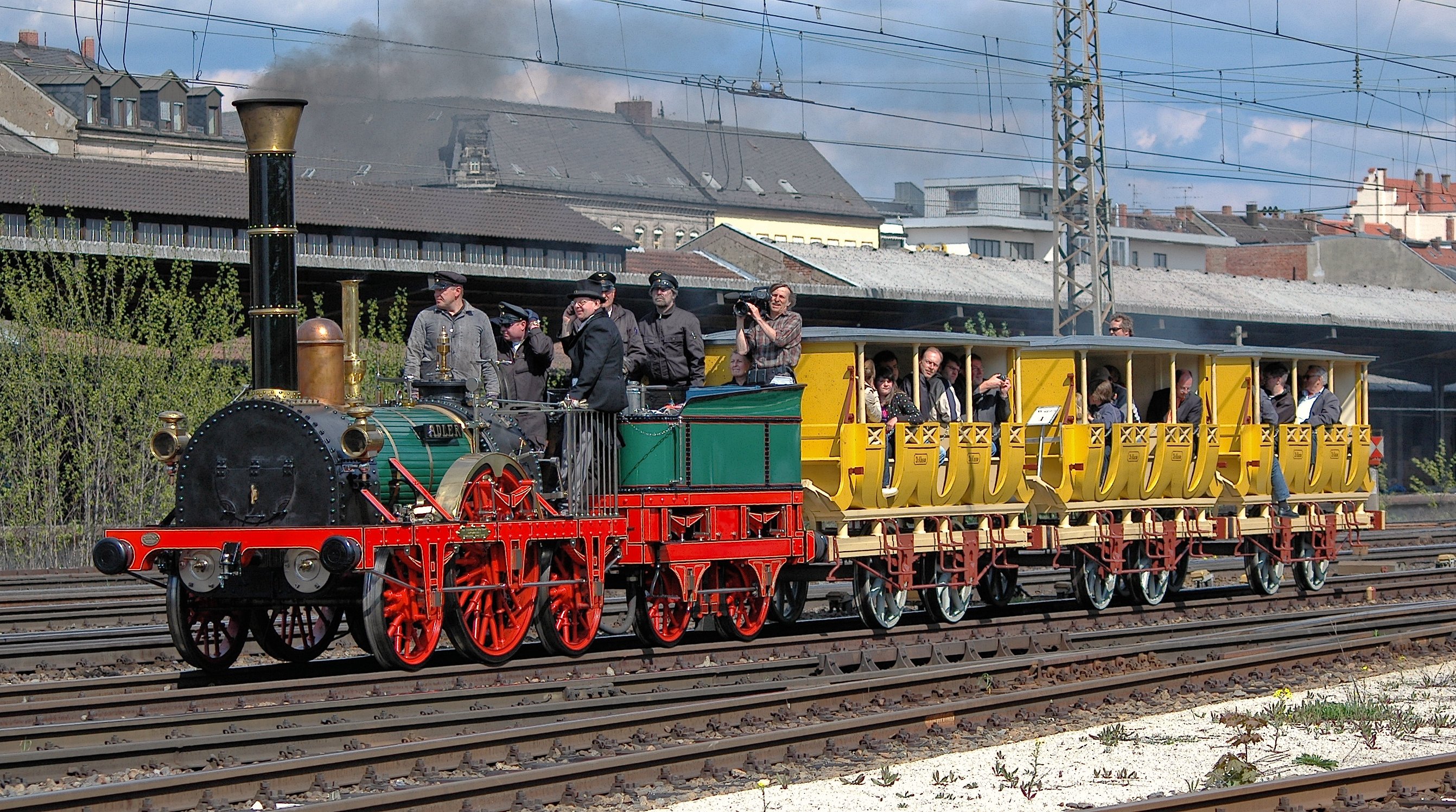
The Adler replica from 1935 on its first trip after the reconstruction in 2008.

The Bavarian Ludwig Railway (Bayerische Ludwigseisenbahn or Ludwigsbahn) was the first steam-hauled railway opened in Germany. The Königlich privilegierte Ludwigs-Eisenbahn-Gesellschaft ("Royal Privileged Ludwig Railway Company", later called the Ludwigs-Eisenbahn-Gesellschaft) received a concession to build a railway from Nuremberg to Fürth (6 km) in the state of Bavaria on 19 February 1834.

== Background ==
The first reports from England over the planning of railways attracted great attention in Germany, particularly in Bavaria, where the road between the important commercial cities of Nuremberg and Fürth was the busiest road connection in the kingdom. Bavarian interest was also stimulated by Friedrich List’s advocacy of an all-German railway system and the reports of Joseph von Baader, whom King Ludwig had sent to England to study railways. After a discussion of this topic in the Bavarian parliament in 1825, it authorised the king to build an experimental railway in the Nymphenburg Palace park. As the king’s 1828 request for Franconian merchants to begin building a railway line led to no action, he turned his attention to his favourite project, the building of the Ludwig Canal between the Danube and the Main.

== Establishment ==
After railways had been operating in England for a few years, local businesspeople decided to build a railway line along the Nürnberg-Fürth road. On 14 May 1833 they founded the Gesellschaft zur Errichtung einer Eisenbahn mit Dampffahrt zwischen Nürnberg und Fürth ("company for the establishment of a steam railway between Nuremberg and Fürth") to develop the railway. Within six months the two main instigators from Nuremberg, the merchant and market chief, George Zacharias Platner, and the head of the poly-technical school, Johannes Scharrer, had successfully raised the planned share capital of 132,000 guilders. The proposed dividend of 12 2/3% was met with skepticism, although the company did, in fact, pay a dividend of 20% in 1836.

King Ludwig was an unenthusiastic supporter of railways because of his preference for building the Ludwig Canal between the Main and the Danube; this was actually built between 1836 and 1846. The canal was relatively unsuccessful because of its profusion of locks, its narrowness and early competition from railways, but it foreshadowed the more successful Rhine-Main-Danube Canal built on a similar route and completed in 1992. Ludwig allowed the railway company to use his name and authorized his government to buy a token two shares in it. Significantly for the construction of the railway, the king made available the Bavarian road builder, Paul Camille von Denis, for the railway construction. Von Denis adopted the English rail gauge of 1435 mm for the nearly dead-straight 6.04 km-long single-track line next to the Fürth-Nuremberg road.

== Start of services ==
On 7 December 1835 the company opened the first German steam-powered railway line for passenger and freight traffic before a large public gathering. The steam locomotive Adler ("eagle") had been supplied with its driver by Stephenson’s company from Newcastle. The Remy & Co aus Rasselstein company of Neuwied, supplied only the 15-foot (4.6 m)-long rails of rolled wrought iron. The carriages were supplied by local wagon-builders.

On 20 September 1831 the private narrow gauge, horse-drawn Prince William Railway coal railway had opened between Hinsbeck (Ruhr) and Nierenhof, but it did not excite the public attention of a steam-hauled and passenger railway. Nevertheless, King Ludwig did not visit the railway named after him until August 1836. The cost of building the railway, which had been estimated at 132,000 guilders, actually reached 170,000 guilders as a result of lack of railway building experience and, in particular, the high price of land acquisition in the absence of a law providing for compulsory purchase.

== Operations ==
Beginning on 8 December 1835 a horse-drawn service operated on the line from Nuremberg to Fürth once an hour. The Adler only operated at 13:00 and 14:00 daily. The high cost of importing hard coal from Saxony, which in the beginning still had to be brought by horse cart, prevented in the early years regular use of the Adler or the Pfeil ("arrow"). With the acquisition of more locomotives, only the early and late services were horse-drawn. Finally in 1863 horse operations were abandoned to reduce maintenance costs (especially the provision of horse tracks) and to raise speeds.

Goods traffic at first consisted of the carriage of newspapers and beer. General freight traffic only started in 1839 and mail traffic in 1840. The success of the line is shown by the fact that up to 1855 dividends were never less than 12%. At the time this was considered a magnificent capital return. Nevertheless, the government refused permission to extend the line to Würzburg.

== Closure ==
Competition developed with the building of horse trams between Nuremberg and Fürth, particularly once they were electrified in 1898. From 1893, part of the line was double-tracked but this was never completed. Traffic and profits fell constantly.

The Ludwigsbahn closed on 31 October 1922. The old station building in Fürth was torn down in 1938, to make room for a Nazi Party parade ground, now a plaza called Fürther Freiheit ("Fürth Liberty"). The Nuremberg station was demolished in 1952 to allow the construction of a new multi-storey building.

After its closures, the line was leased to the Nuremberg tramways. A high-speed tram service operated on the Ludwigsbahn's right of way from 1927 until 1981. It was then replaced by the line U1 of the Nuremberg U-Bahn along the route, running partly underground and partly elevated. This was opened to Fürth station on 5 December 1985, 150 years after the opening of the original line.

The line ran from the Nuremberg station in Plärrer place, along today's Fürther Straße, past the boundary with Fürth and then followed the present Hornschuchpromenade to the Ludwig station at Fürther Freiheit, 100 metres north of Fürth station.

== Locomotives and carriages ==
The Ludwigsbahn possessed many locomotives during its 87 years of operation. Some were bought second-hand, many were sold when it was closed.

Name	Design	Manufacturer	Acquired	Disposed
Adler	1A1	Stephenson 1835	1835	sold 1857
Pfeil	1A1	Stephenson 1836	1836	sold
Nürnberg-Fürth	1A1	Henschel 1852/14	1852	scrapped 1889
Phoenix	1A1	Maffei 1853/127	1853	scrapped 1869
Adler II	1A1	Maffei 1857/279	1857	scrapped 1889
Johannes Scharrer	1A1	Henschel 1865/108	1865	scrapped 1887
Faust	1A1	Maffei 1845/6	1872	scrapped 1881
Henlein	1A1	Maffei 1845/8	1873	scrapped 1880
Wallenstein	1A1	Kessler 1845/30	1875	scrapped 1885
Bavaria	Bn2t	Maffei 1879/1204	1879	sold 1923
Pegnitz	Bn2t	Maffei 1880/1224	1880	sold 1923
Franconia	Bn2t	Maffei 1881/1248	1881	sold 1923
Daniel Ley	1Bn2t	Maffei 1886/1414	1886	sold 1923
Johannes Scharrer II	Bn2t	Maffei 1887/1453	1887	sold 1923
Nürnberg-Fürth II	Bn2t	Maffei 1889/1538	1889	sold 1923
Germania	1Bn2t	Maffei 1906/2511	1906	sold 1923
Ludwig	1Bn2t	Maffei 1906/2549	1906	sold 1923

In 1935 a replica of the Adler was constructed on old plans for the 100-year anniversary of the German railways, but it was seriously damaged on 17 October 2005 together with many other preserved locomotives in the great fire at the Nuremberg shed. However it was painstakingly restored in 2007 at a cost of € 1M and made operational again. The greatest number of carriages during the line's existence was in 1893: 44 coaches, 1 luggage van and 10 wagons.

== Sources ==
- Klee, Wolfgang, Bayerische Eisenbahngeschichte, Part 1: 1835–1875 in Bayern-Report, Fürstenfeldbruck, 1993. (in German)
- Wolff, Gerd, Deutsche Klein- und Privatbahnen, Part 6, Bayern, Gifhorn, 1978. (in German)
- Deutsche Reichsbahn, Die Deutschen Eisenbahnen in ihrer Entwicklung 1835–1935, Berlin, 1935. (in German)
- DB Museum, Geschichte der Eisenbahn in Deutschland, Volume 1: Ein Jahrhundert unter Dampf, Die Eisenbahn in Deutschland 1835 – 1919, Nürnberg, 2005 (in German)

== See also ==
- Royal Bavarian State Railways
- List of Bavarian locomotives and railbuses
