= Dorstadt =

- Municipality
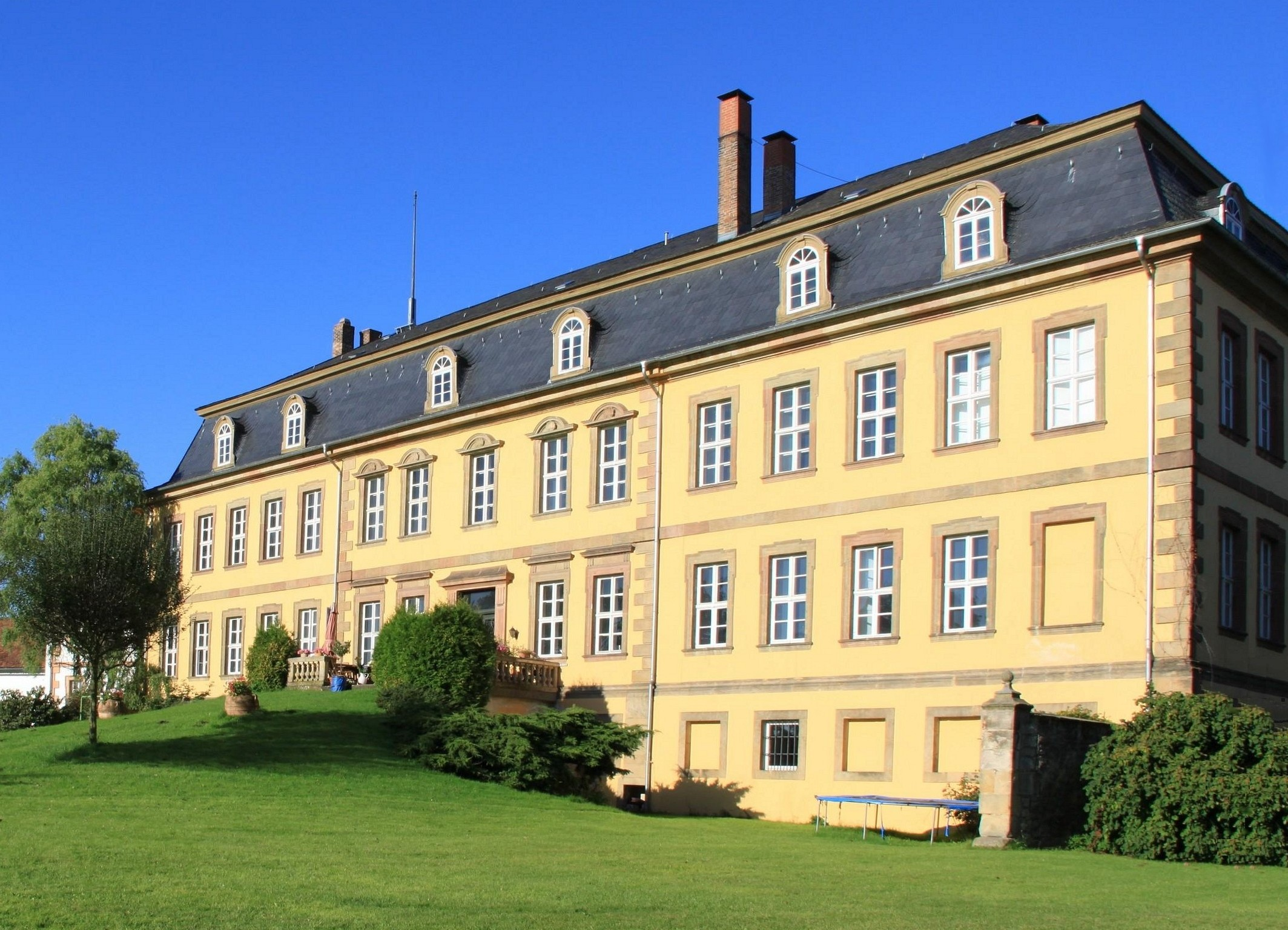
- Manor house

- Coat of arms

- Location of Dorstadt within Wolfenbüttel district
- Interactive map of Dorstadt
- Location within Germany Location within Lower Saxony
- Coordinates: 52°06′N 10°34′E
- Country: Germany
- State: Lower Saxony
- District: Wolfenbüttel
- Municipal assoc.: Oderwald

Government
  - Mayor: Bruno Polzin (SPD)

Area
  - Total: 10.36 km^{2} (4.00 sq mi)
- Elevation: 80 m (260 ft)

Population (2025-12-31)
  - Total: 737
  - Density: 71.1/km^{2} (184/sq mi)
- Time zone: UTC+01:00 (CET)
  - Summer (DST): UTC+02:00 (CEST)
- Postal codes: 38312
- Dialling codes: 05337
- Vehicle registration: WF

Dorstadt is a municipality in the district of Wolfenbüttel, in Lower Saxony, Germany. It is part of the Samtgemeinde ("collective municipality") Oderwald.

== Geography ==
Dorstadt is located in the northern foothills of the Harz mountain range. The municipal area stretches from the eastern slopes of the Oderwald hills down to the Oker river, about halfway between Wolfenbüttel and Schladen. Neighbouring municipalities are Ohrum in the north and Heiningen in the south, as well as Börßum east of the Oker.

== History ==
The settlement was first mentioned in an 1110 deed, when Bishop Udo of Bishopric of Hildesheim granted the episcopal fortress at Schladen to the Saxon noble Eiko of Dorstadt.

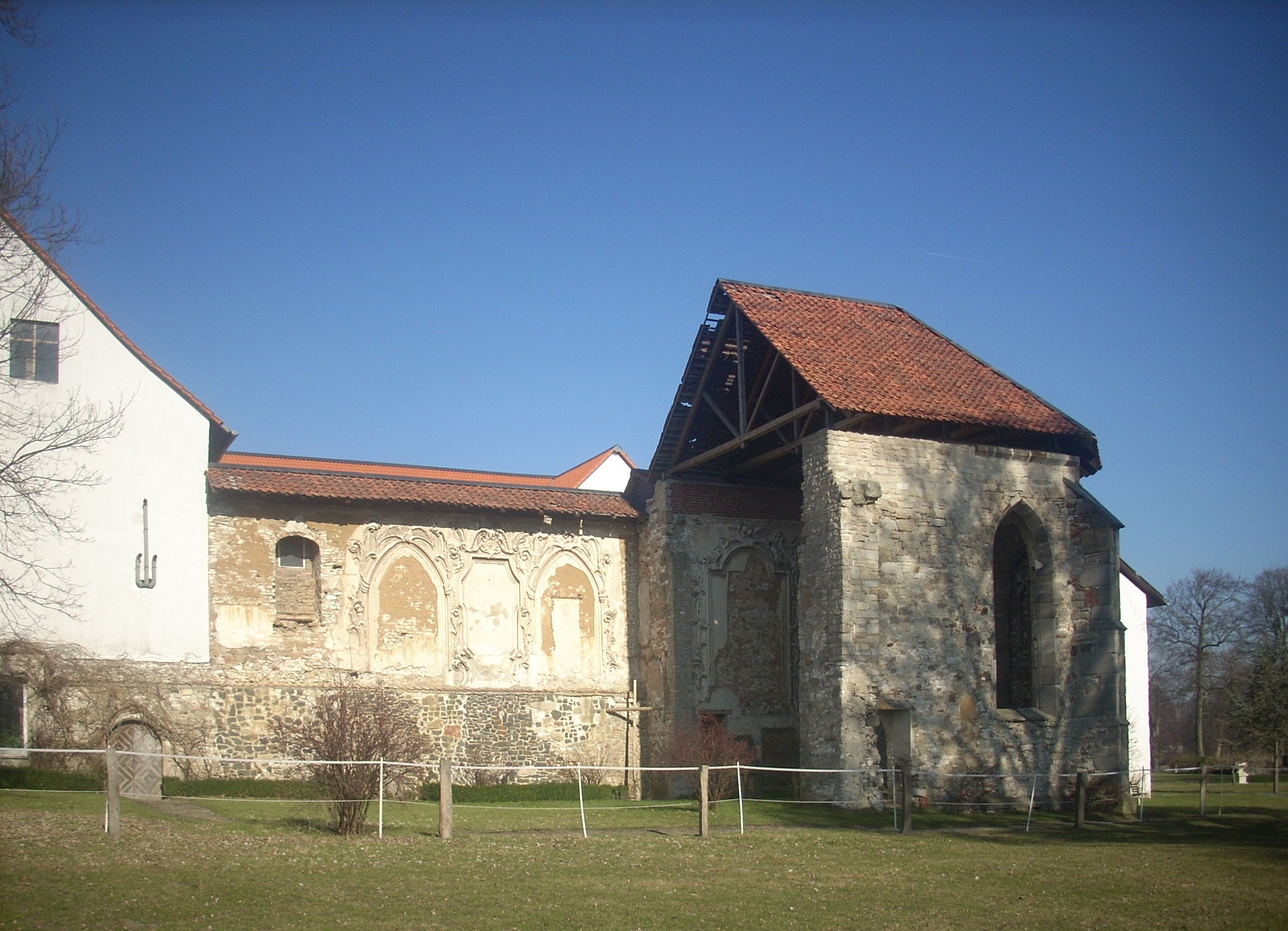
Monastery church ruins

In 1189 the Lords of Dorstadt, encouraged by their relative Bishop Adelog of Hildesheim, founded an Augustinian nunnery at the site. For several decades the monastery prospered, nevertheless first land sales were documented in the early 14th century, and in 1438 large parts of the premises were devastated by fire. Upon the Hildesheim Diocesan Feud, Dorstadt passed to the Duchy of Brunswick-Lüneburg. In the course of the Protestant Reformation, the nuns turned Lutheran under the rule of Duke Julius of Brunswick-Wolfenbüttel in 1568.

Dorstadt was restored to Hildesheim in 1643, however, the premises decayed and had to be resettled with Catholic nuns after the Thirty Years' War. The Wittelsbach prince-bishop Maximilian Henry of Bavaria initiated the reconstruction of the monastery in a Baroque style from 1680 onwards. After the Hildesheim prince-bishopric was mediatised to Prussia in 1803, Dorstadt was secularised and the convent dissolved. The manor is a private property up to today.

== Politics ==
Seats in the municipal council (Gemeinderat) as of 2011 local elections:

- Social Democratic Party of Germany (SPD): 5
- Christian Democratic Union of Germany (CDU): 4
