= Börßum–Kreiensen railway =

Railway line in Germany

Börßum–Kreiensen
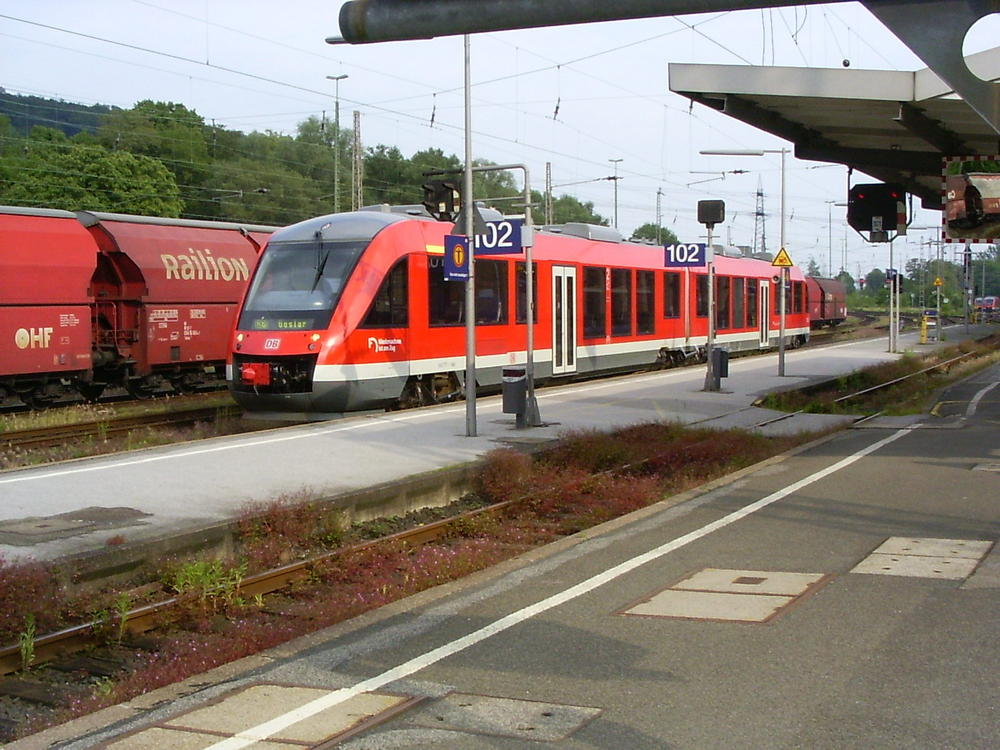
- Kreiensen station with a Regionalbahn train to Goslar

Overview
- Native name: Braunschweigische Südbahn
- Line number: 1940
- Locale: Lower Saxony, Germany
- Termini: Börßum; Kreiensen

Service
- Route number: 358

Technical
- Line length: 67.4 km (41.9 mi)
- Number of tracks: 2 between Salzgitter Bad and Kreiensen
- Track gauge: 1,435 mm (4 ft 8 1/2 in) standard gauge

The Börßum–Kreiensen railway (also known in German as the Braunschweigische Südbahn—"Brunswick Southern Railway") was built by the Duchy of Brunswick State Railway as a link from its Brunswick–Bad Harzburg railway to the Hanoverian Southern Railway. It ran through the northwestern Harz Foreland from Börßum via Salzgitter, Ringelheim and Seesen to Kreiensen. It opened on 5 August 1856 and is one of the oldest railways in Germany.

In 1956 a shorter link to Brunswick was built in the shape of the Brunswick–Salzgitter Bad railway.

== Traffic ==
Today it mainly serves regional trains and, after that, a few goods trains. In the 2009 timetable it will be worked hourly by Regionalbahn trains from Brunswick via Seeseon to Herzberg am Harz, and every two hours by the Regionalbahn from Bad Harzburg via Seesen to Kreiensen (with extra services at peak times). Normally Lint multiples (DB Class 648) are used that are stabled by Alstom at Salzgitter. From a fares perspective, the line from Brunswick to Seesen forms part of the Brunswick Region Fare Zone and, from Seesen to Kreiensen, the Lower Saxony Transport Network.

== History ==
The Brunswick–Hanover Treaty of 1837 that regulated the construction of the Brunswick–Bad Harzburg railway had already established a basic agreement allowing both countries to work together towards a southern link. Only 15 years later a further treaty was contracted. This allowed Brunswick to build a line from Brunswick to the Hanoverian Southern Railway at Kreiensen. This in turn allowed Hanover to build a railway line from Börßum (in Brunswick) via Ringelheim (Hanover) to Seesen (Brunswick). From there it was agreed to build the line via Harriehausen (again in Hanover) to Kreiensen, where both lines were connected. The line was opened on 5 August 1856. Three months earlier the Hanoverian Southern Railway was opened from Hanover to Kassel.

The line was successful and in 1865, the Altenbeken–Kreiensen railway was opened, creating a western connection with the Ruhr area. In 1868 this was followed by the link from Börßum to Jerxheim on the former Brunswick–Wolfenbüttel–Jerxheim–Oschersleben– Magdeburg railway. This connection became an important east–west route, with traffic to and from Göttingen and Frankfurt stronger than that to and from the Ruhr. The Herzberg–Seesen railway, opened in 1871, however, did not fulfil expectations.

After the division of Germany traffic flows changed. All railways between Helmstedt (Brunswick–Magdeburg railway) and Walkenried (South Harz Railway) were disrupted at the Inner-German border, including the Jerxheim crossing on the line from Magdeburg via Eilsleben and Oschersleben. Better access was sought in the Salzgitter area. In 1956, a direct connection from Salzgitter-Bad to Brunswick was opened by closing a gap from Salzgitter to Drütte, partly using a section of the Brunswick–Derneburg railway that was closed in the 1940s.

The railway is not electrified and today, Salzgitter-Drütte to Neuekrug-Hahausen is single track. It is part of Deutsche Bahn’s Harz-Weser network. It is planned to be controlled remotely from the electronic interlocking in Göttingen.
