= Altencelle =

- Ortsteil of Celle
- Interactive map of Altencelle
- Location within Germany Location within Lower Saxony
- Coordinates: 52°35′53″N 10°06′53″E
- Country: Germany
- State: Lower Saxony
- District: Celle
- Town: Celle
- Elevation: 39 m (128 ft)

Population (2020-12-31)
  - Total: 4,739
- Time zone: UTC+01:00 (CET)
  - Summer (DST): UTC+02:00 (CEST)
- Postal codes: 29227
- Dialling codes: 05141

Altencelle is part of the borough of Celle in Lower Saxony and lies southeast of the town centre, west of the River Aller and east of the Fuhse. It is linked to Celle by the B 214 federal road and state highway K 74.

== History ==
The present day name of Altencelle clearly shows that the original town of Celle (granted town rights since 1249), "old Celle" or alte Celle, was located here. The village was first mentioned in the records in 986 as Kellu ("settlement by the river"). At that time there was a castle (Burg) there belonging to the Brunonen family. Today, like the Ringwall von Burg in the suburb of Burg, only archaeological evidence remains. Duke Otto the Strict left Altencelle in 1292 and founded the "new" Celle about 3 kilometres (1.9 mi) northwest near another existing castle.

== Politics ==
The chairman of the village council (Ortsbürgermeister) is Otto Stumpf (CDU).

== Culture and places of interest ==
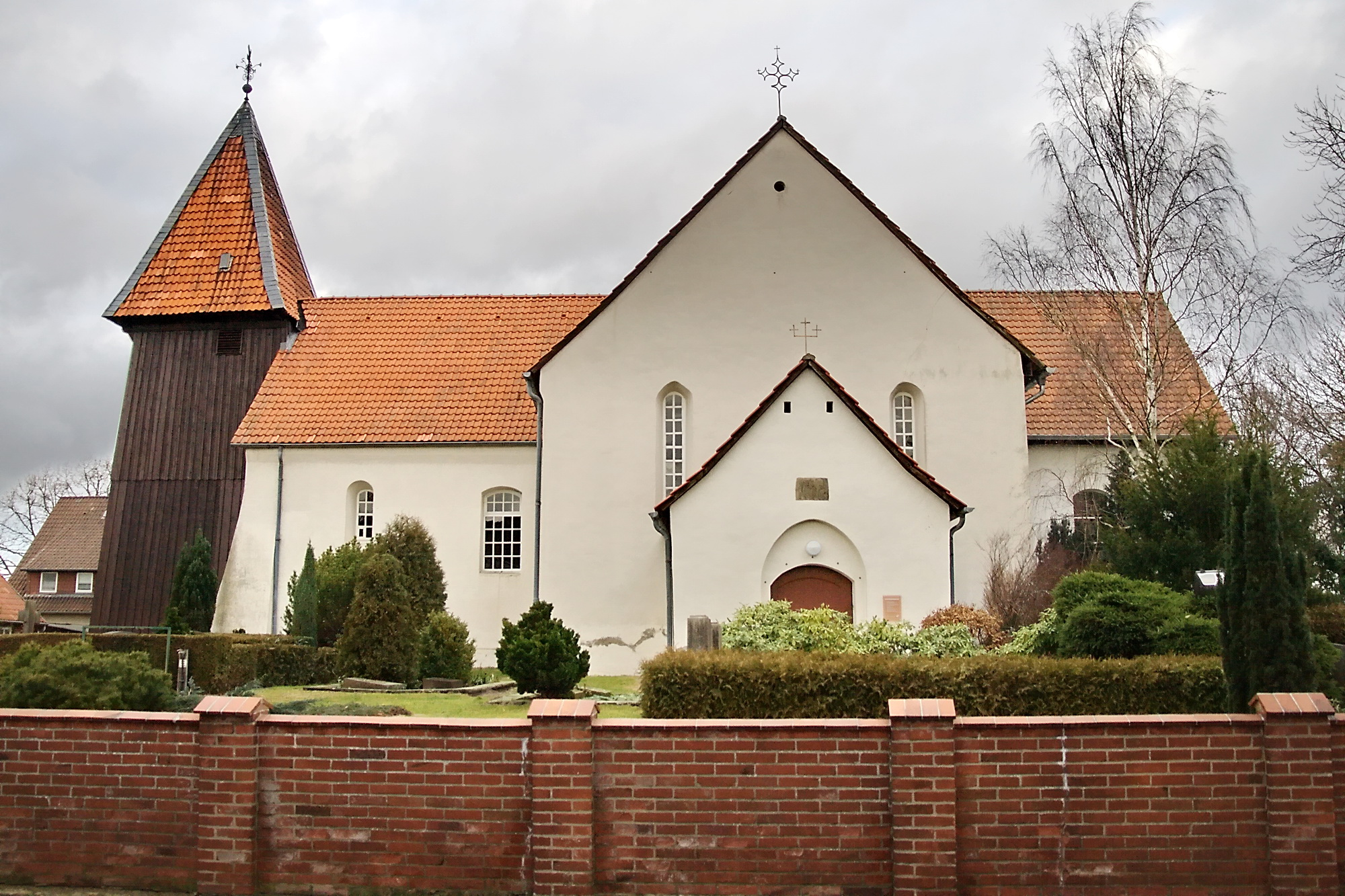
St. Gertrude's

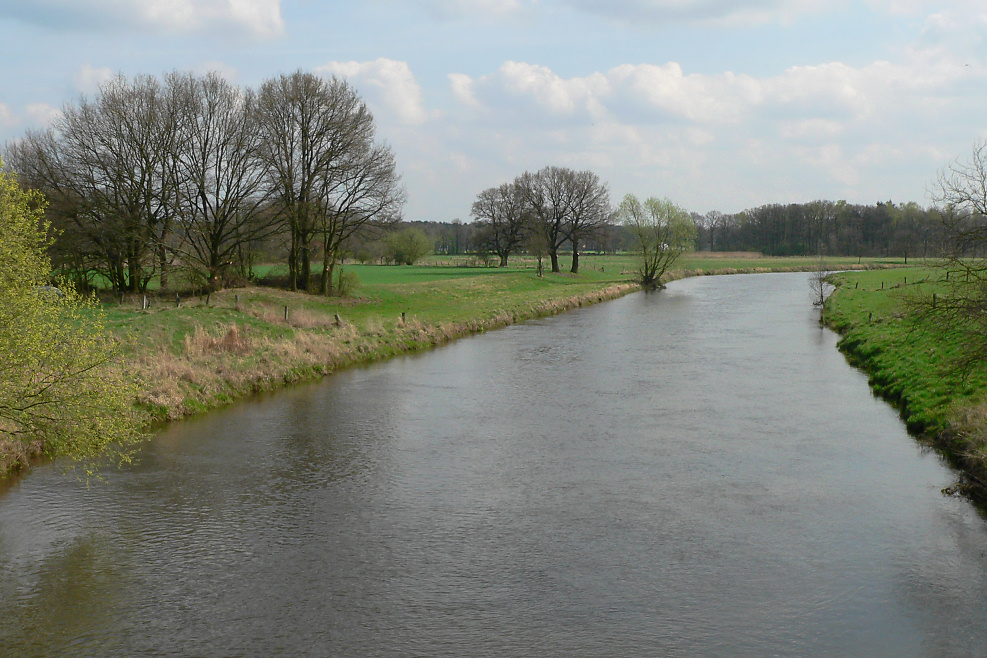
The Aller near Altencelle

- The origins of Saint Gertrude's Church (the Gertrudenkirche) go back to about 1000 and it is one of the oldest church buildings in the region of Celle. The present building dates mainly to the 14th century.
- The Ringwall von Burg ("ring embankment of the castle") at Burg is one of the most important early Middle Ages cultural monuments in the Celle area. The Wallburg or fortified camp in the valley not far from the Fuhse may have acted as a refuge for the population.
