= Cramme =

- Municipality
- Location of Cramme within Wolfenbüttel district
- Interactive map of Cramme
- Location within Germany Location within Lower Saxony
- Coordinates: 52°06′47″N 10°26′44″E
- Country: Germany
- State: Lower Saxony
- District: Wolfenbüttel
- Municipal assoc.: Oderwald

Government
  - Mayor: Waltraut Klose (SPD)

Area
  - Total: 12.45 km^{2} (4.81 sq mi)
- Elevation: 108 m (354 ft)

Population (2025-12-31)
  - Total: 793
  - Density: 63.7/km^{2} (165/sq mi)
- Time zone: UTC+01:00 (CET)
  - Summer (DST): UTC+02:00 (CEST)
- Postal codes: 38312
- Vehicle registration: WF
- Website: www.cramme.de

Cramme (German pronunciation: [ˈkʁamə]) is a municipality in the district of Wolfenbüttel, in Lower Saxony, Germany.
