= Weddel loop =

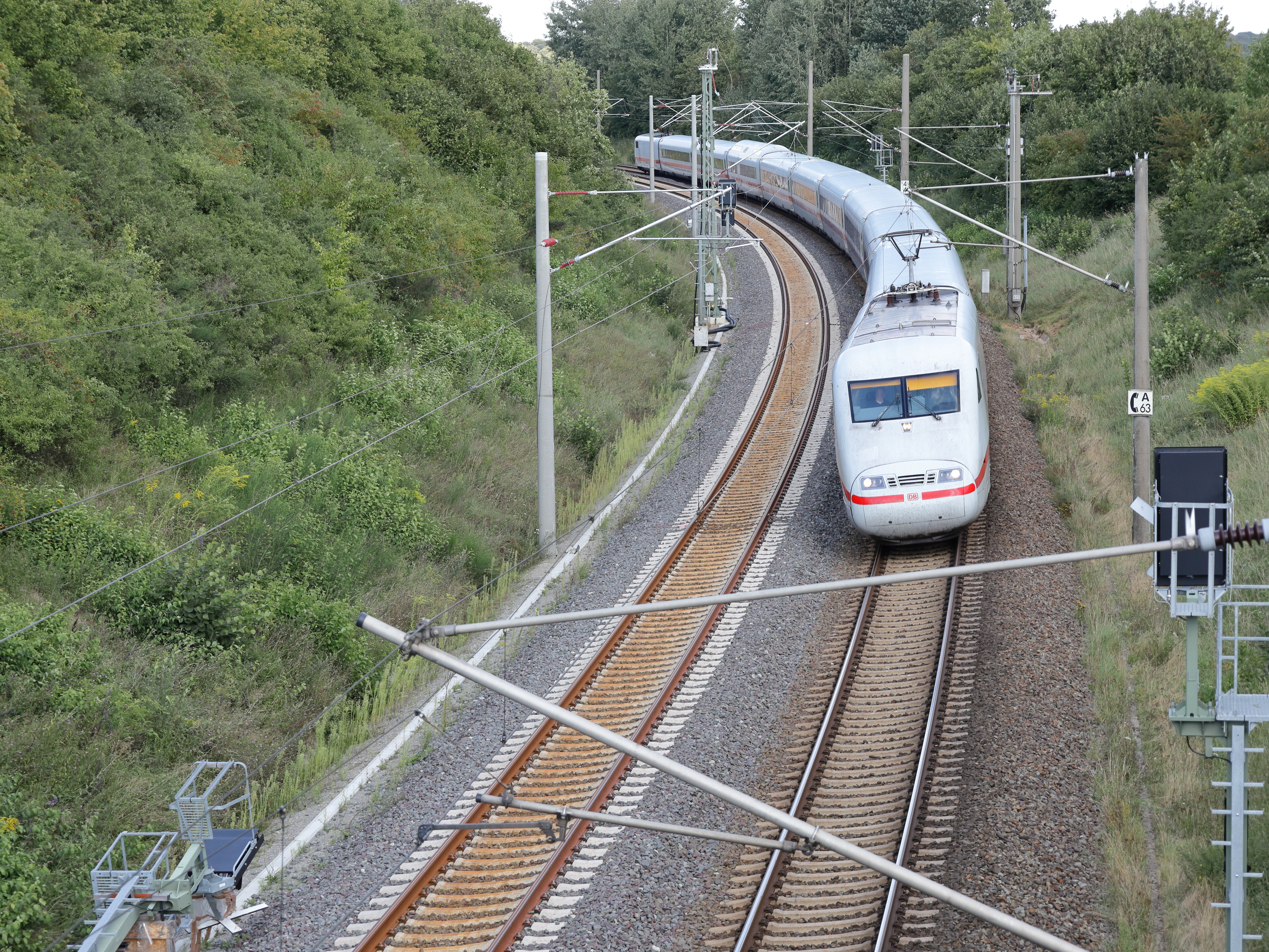
- An ICE train on the Weddel loop

Overview
- Native name: Weddeler Schleife
- Line number: 1956
- Locale: Lower Saxony, Germany
- Termini: Brunswick; Wolfsburg

Service
- Route number: 301/349

Technical
- Line length: 24.8 km (15.4 mi)
- Track gauge: 1,435 mm (4 ft 8 1/2 in) standard gauge
- Electrification: 15 kV/16.7 Hz AC overhead catenary
- Operating speed: 160 km/h (99.4 mph) (max)

The Weddel loop is a 21.1 km (13.1 mi) long German railway between Fallersleben (part of Wolfsburg) and Weddel (in the municipality of Cremlingen near Brunswick). It is double-track and electrified and forms part of route number 301 (Brunswick–Wolfsburg–Stendal). It connects the Hanover–Berlin high-speed line with the Hanover–Würzburg high-speed line for Intercity Express trains running between Frankfurt and Berlin.

== Route ==
The route branches off the Brunswick–Magdeburg line (No. 1900, KBS 310) east of Weddel station 6.6 km (4.1 mi) east of Braunschweig Hauptbahnhof (near the line's 10 km (6.2 mi) chainage point) and runs as a single track to Lehre station. This station has no passenger facilities, but has two tracks, which provide the only possibility for trains to overtake or cross on the route. It continues as a single track to Sülfeld junction where it again forms two tracks. One of them crosses a bridge over the high-speed line (at its 187.5 km mark) and then connects with the northern track of the high-speed line (running towards Hanover). The other track runs directly onto the southern track (running towards Wolfsburg and Berlin).

The Weddel loop has been prepared for the installation of a second track. Provision has also been made for a raising of speed limits to 200 km/h. Between the 22.4 km (13.9 mi) and 24 km (15 mi) marks the line is equipped with the German automatic train protection system, Linienzugbeeinflussung.

== Significance of route ==
The line links Brunswick and Hildesheim with the Hanover–Berlin high speed line which was built at the same time. At Hildesheim long-distance trains connect with the Hanover-Würzburg high speed line via the Hildesheim loop.

Each hour, approximately every one pair of ICE trains (Berlin–Frankfurt am Main–Mannheim) and a pair Regionalbahn trains run on the line. Between the junctions at each end of the track the line has a speed limit of 160 km/h (99 mph). Along with the single-track Hildesheim loop and the single-track Hildesheim–Groß Gleidingen line, the Weddel loop is one of the bottlenecks between Frankfurt and Berlin. In particular, the level junction in Weddel has proved to cause delays.

== Planning and construction ==
=== History prior to 1989 ===
Between 1901 and 1904 the Schunter Valley Railway was built as the first rail link between Fallersleben and Brunswick. It was a branch line of the Brunswick State Railway Company that left Fallersleben towards the east, running east of the current line before crossing it north of Lehre, then running along the Schunter river to Brunswick-Gliesmarode (then not connected to the Brunswick–Uelzen railway) and terminating at the then North Station (German: Nordbahnhof) of the Brunswick State Railway. This line was nationalised in 1938 and a new connection was built at its western end to connect with Gliesmarode station. At the eastern end of the line a two-track main line was planned from Fallersleben, where the Volkswagen works is now connected with the Lehrte Railway, to the planned new Brunswick central station (about where the current station was opened in 1960) and on to the newly built steel mill in Salzgitter. The route would leave Fallersleben to the west and run directly south. Of the planned works only the single track section north of Lehre had been completed by 1942 and this was attached temporarily to the existing branch line; construction work then stopped because of World War II and the old line was closed between Lehre and Fallersleben. This temporary connection remained for over fifty years, although the branch line was used by up to 20 freight trains a day.

=== Planning from 1990 to construction in 1996-1998 ===
In accordance with the decision taken in July 1990 to construct the Hanover–Berlin high-speed line on the northern route (via Wolfsburg) instead of the alternative southern route (through Magdeburg and Potsdam), the establishment of a connection through the stations of Wolfsburg and Brunswick was necessary. Although a direct connection was considered between Oebisfelde and Brunswick, this idea was dropped in the face of strong opposition from the city of Wolfsburg.

After long discussions over the financing of a new line it was decided to reduce the project from double track to single track at an estimated cost of Deutsche Mark 300–350 million, saving DM 50 to 100 million. In November 1996, the Federal Ministry of Transport agreed to release DM 242 million for the project and after the finalisation of planning approvals large-scale construction began in 1997. Although it was originally planned to open the new line in early 1999, in May 1998 Deutsche Bahn decided to complete it at the same time as the Hanover–Berlin high-speed line, because DB considered that Hannover Hauptbahnhof would not cope with all Intercity-Express being routed that way, which would require a reversal. This required work 24 hours a day, seven days a week. The new line was opened on 20 September 1998.

=== Upgrades ===
In 2021 work began to double track the entire route with work due to be completed in 2023 or 2024. The work included 8 new bridges and the widening of 2 others. Additionally new sound barriers were installed (especially in the northern part of the route. Stated benefits of the upgrade included:

- An increase in regional trains (both Braunschweig - Weddel - Fallersleben - Wolfsburg and Braunschweig - Weddel - Helmstedt can be served twice hourly)
- Improvements in punctuality

The cost of the upgrade was estimated €150 million with 25% being state/local funding and the remainder being funded by the federal government. Construction work was completed on 21 March 2024. With the commissioning, regional services were increased from hourly to half-hourly. The cost of the double-track upgrade was now estimated at around €190 million.

== Notes ==
- Hörstel, Jürgen (1998). "6: Der Anschluss nach Süden − Fallersleben–Braunschweig (The connection to the south—Fallersleben-Brunswick)". Hannover–Berlin. Geschichte und Bau einer Schnellbahnverbindung (Hanover-Berlin. History and construction of a high-speed line) (in German). Stuttgart: Transpress-Verlag. ISBN 3-613-71088-9.
- Fiegenbaum, Wolfgang; Klee, Wolfgang (2000). Abschied von der Schiene. Stillgelegte Bahnstrecken im Personenverkehr Deutschlands 1998–1999 (Farewell to the railway. Disused German passenger railways 1998-1999) (in German). Stuttgart: Transpress-Verlag. pp. 9–11. ISBN 3-613-71144-3. (old route)
