= Achim, Wolfenbüttel =

Achim
- Ortsteil of Börßum
- Coat of arms
- Interactive map of Achim
- Location within Germany Location within Lower Saxony
- Coordinates: 52°03′38″N 10°36′42″E
- Country: Germany
- State: Lower Saxony
- District: Wolfenbüttel
- Municipality: Börßum
- Subdivisions: 3 Ortsteile

Area
  - Total: 15.81 km^{2} (6.10 sq mi)
- Elevation: 91 m (299 ft)

Population (2010-12-31)
  - Total: 679
  - Density: 42.9/km^{2} (111/sq mi)
- Time zone: UTC+01:00 (CET)
  - Summer (DST): UTC+02:00 (CEST)
- Postal codes: 38312
- Dialling codes: 05334
- Vehicle registration: WF

Achim is a village and a former municipality in the district of Wolfenbüttel, in Lower Saxony, Germany. Since 1 November 2011, it is part of the municipality Börßum.
