= Hildesheim–Brunswick railway =

Railway line in Germany

Overview
- Line number: 1772 Hildesheim–Groß Gleidingen; 1730 Groß Gleidungen–Brunswick
- Locale: Lower Saxony, Germany

Service
- Route number: 313

Technical
- Line length: 42.5 km (26.4 mi)
- Number of tracks: 2
- Track gauge: 1,435 mm (4 ft 8 1/2 in) standard gauge
- Electrification: 15 kV/16.7 Hz AC catenary
- Operating speed: 140 km/h (87 mph) (maximum)

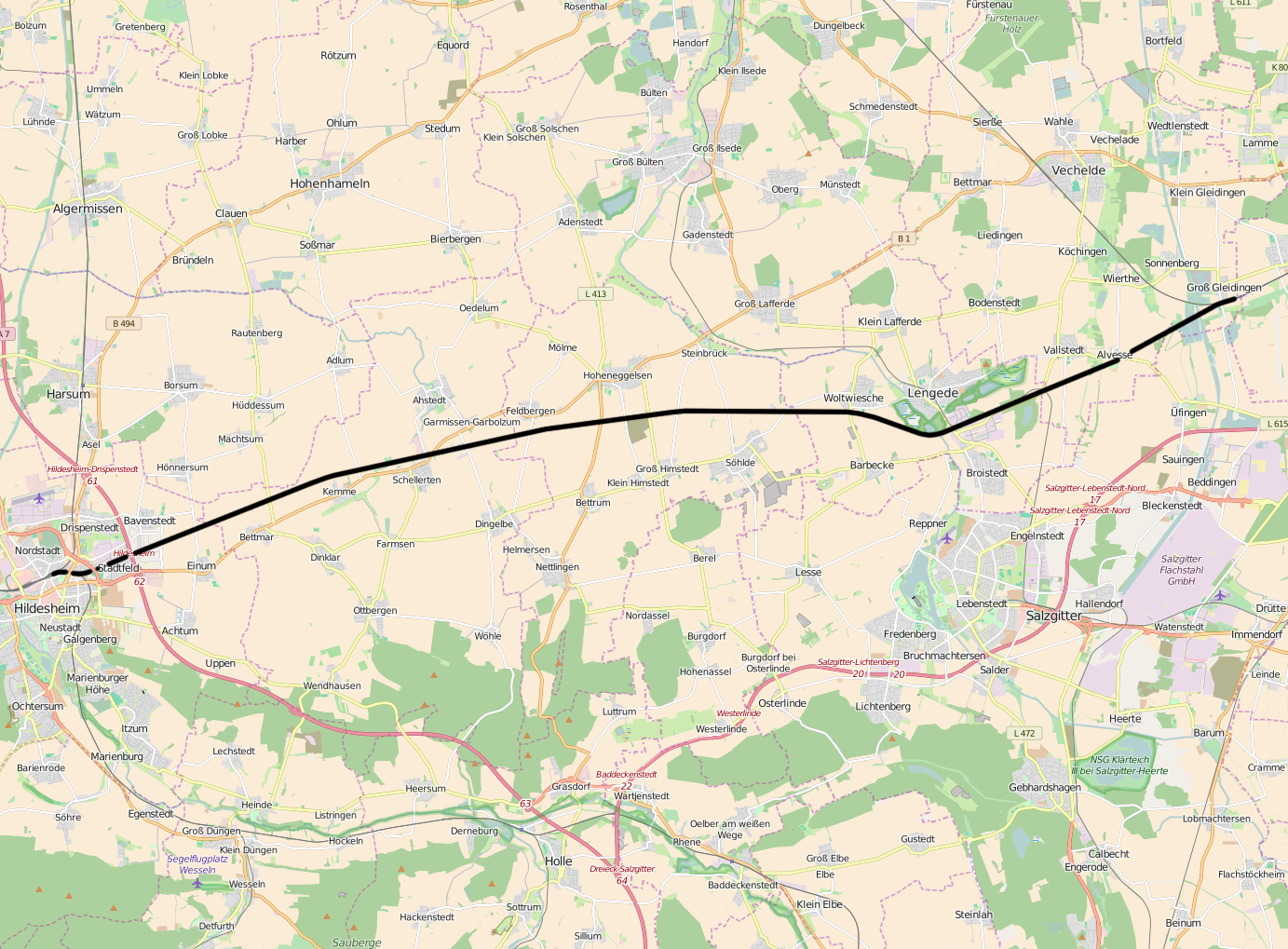
Hildesheim–Groß Gleidingen section: line number 1772

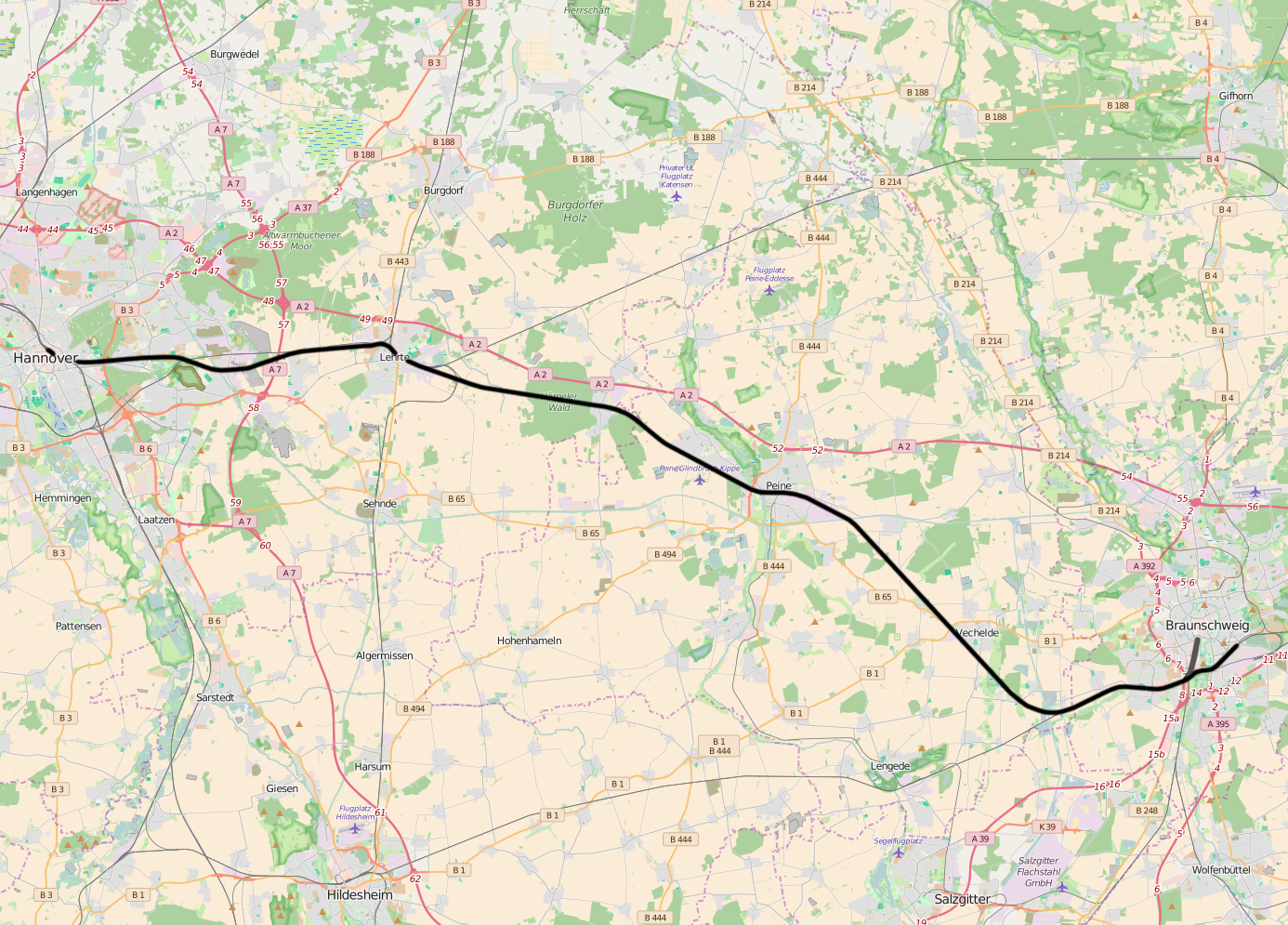
Groß Gleidingen–Braunschweig section: line number 1730

The Hildesheim–Brunswick line is a 43 km long electrified main line railway in the German state of Lower Saxony. It forms part of the Intercity-Express route from Frankfurt to Berlin. It is also used as a diversion route from the Hanover–Brunswick line. It is a single track line from Hildesheim to Groß Gleidingen. A proposal to duplicate the line was included in the Federal Transport Infrastructure Plan of 1992.

== History ==
The first railways were opened to Hildesheim and Brunswick in the 1840s. A direct connection across the former border between the Kingdom of Hanover and the Duchy of Brunswick was, however, not desired, at least in Hanover. East–west traffic ran through Lehrte and Kreiensen. Hildesheim was only connected via Lehrte in the north and with a branch line to Nordstemmen station on the Hanoverian Southern Railway.

After the annexation of Hanover by Prussia after the War of 1866, this situation slowly changed. The Hanover-Altenbeken Railway Company (German: Hannover-Altenbekener Eisenbahn-Gesellschaft) built the Elze–Löhne line in 1875 and connected it with the Hildesheim–Goslar line to the southeast. This meant that Hildesheim was connected to the rail network for east–west traffic. It only needed a direct connection to Brunswick to cope with increasing levels of traffic from the iron ore mines in the northern Harz district. In 1888 the approximately 35 km long link between Hildesheim to the Hanover–Brunswick line at Gross Gleidingen was put into operation.

The railway was only a secondary line. It does not lead to the major nearby city of Hanover and, until 1960, the old Brunswick station, which was built as a terminus, inhibited through traffic. From 1945, the Inner German border blocked most traffic to the east of Brunswick. With the construction of the Hanover–Würzburg high-speed line and the Hildesheim loop built to connect it to Hildesheim and Brunswick from the south, InterCity trains began to run from Frankfurt via Göttingen, Hildesheim, Brunswick and Magdeburg to Berlin in 1991. These were replaced by Intercity-Express trains in 1993 and since 1998 they have taken the route east of Brunswick via the Weddel loop and Hanover–Berlin high-speed line.

The section from Hildesheim to Hoheneggelsen was opened on 16 August 1888 and this was followed by the rest of the line to Groß Gleidingen so that the approximately 35 kilometre-long connection from Hildesheim on the Hannover–Brunswick railway could be used throughout on 1 February 1889. Four years later, the first German Durchgangszug (D-Zug, express train with a connecting corridor) ran over the line, the D 31/32 between Cologne and Berlin, since it formed part of the shortest route.

The line was still a secondary railway. It did not directly connect with Hanover and until 1960 the old Brunswick station was a terminus, which discouraged through traffic. The establishment of the inner German border blocked most of the traffic from Brunswick to the east from 1945. Electrical operations commenced on the line on 25 May 1976.

With the construction of the Hanover–Würzburg high-speed railway, the Hildesheim loop was built to connect Hildesheim and Brunswick to the south. From 1991, IC trains ran from Frankfurt via Göttingen, Hildesheim, Brunswick and Magdeburg to Berlin. These were replaced in 1993 by ICE services; since 1998 these have run east of Brunswick over the Weddel loop and the Hanover–Berlin high-speed railway. The single-track operation proved to be vulnerable to delays. In the Federal Transport Infrastructure Plan (Bundesverkehrswegeplan) of 1992 and its successor, the Federal Transport Infrastructure Plan of 2003 included an upgraded Löhne–Hamelin–Hildesheim–Brunswick route, including, inter alia, the duplication of the whole line, which was completed in 2012.

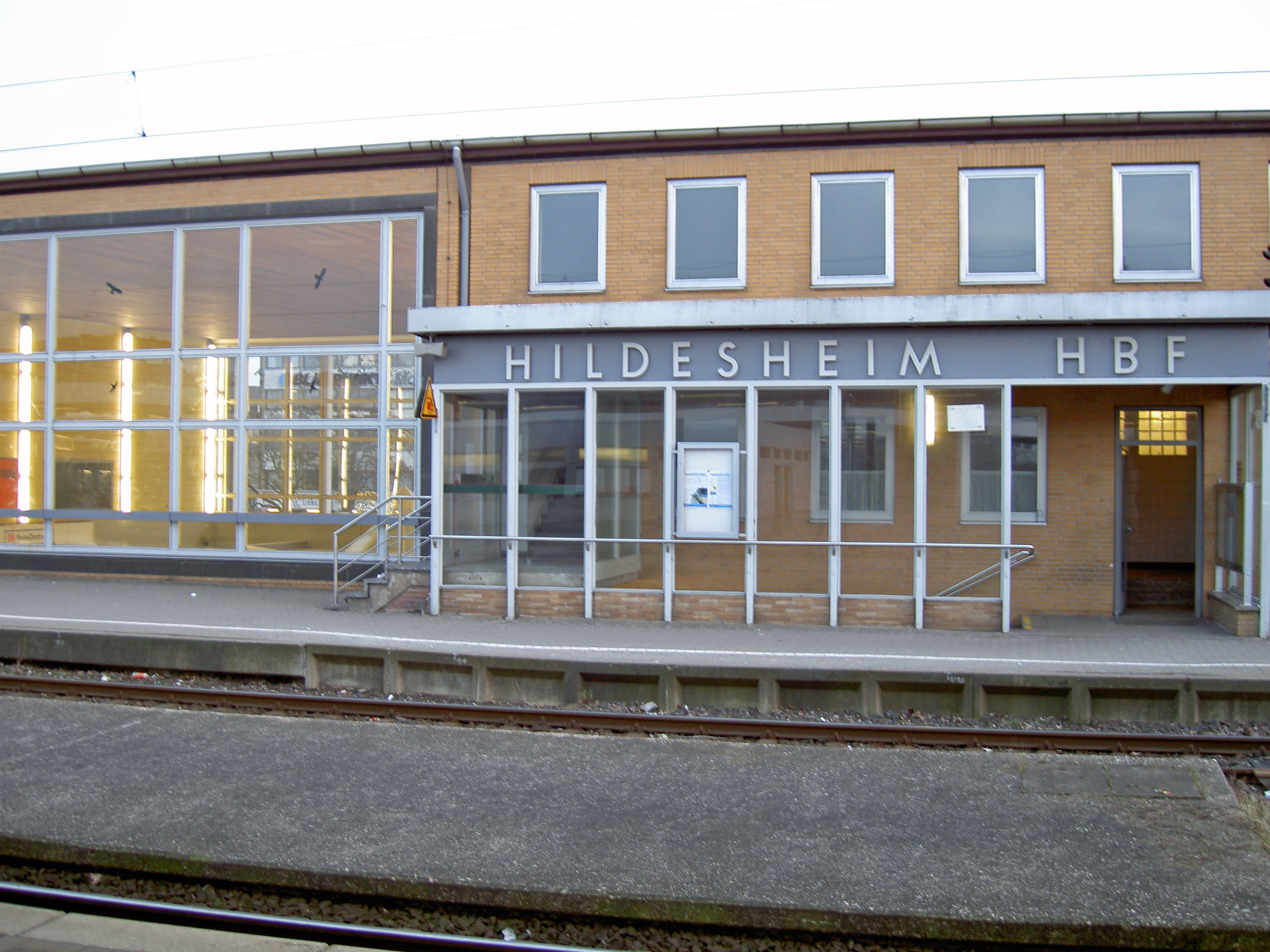
Hildesheim Hauptbahnhof. All stations on this line have practical and economical architecture

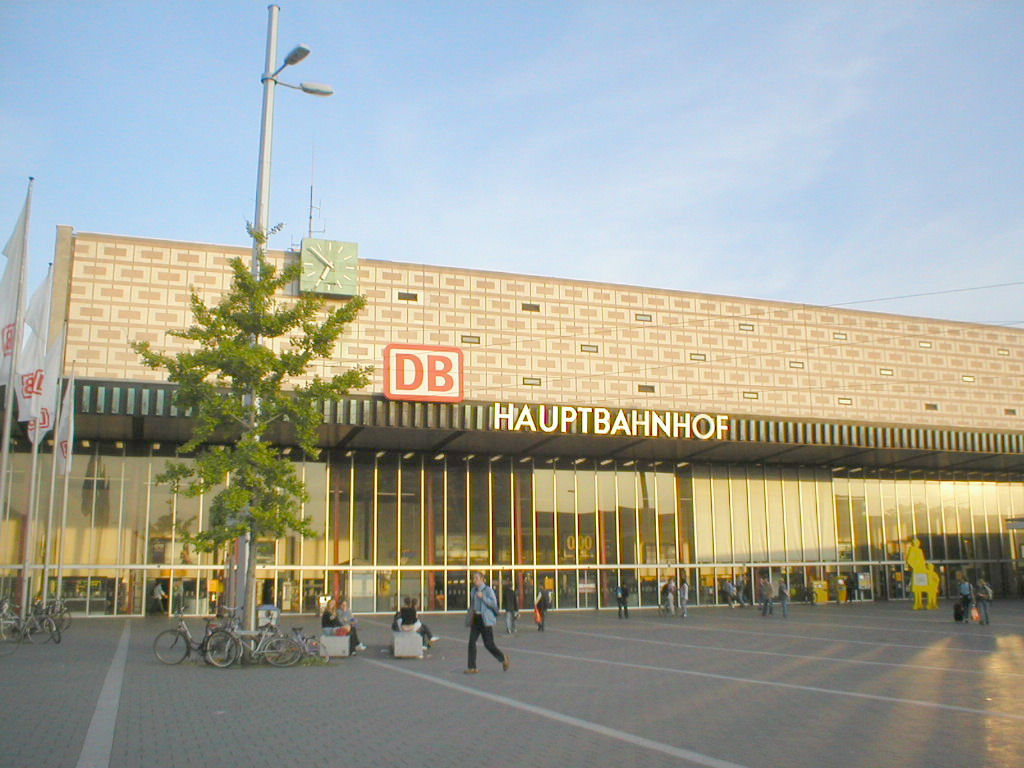
Brunswick Hauptbahnhof, built in the 1960s

The section between Hildesheim and Groß Gleidingen was completely closed for renovation between June 20 and 12 September 2002.

=== Double-tracking for 160 km/h ===
In the spring of 2000, the Federal Ministry of Transport examined plans to upgrade the Brunswick–Hamelin–Löhne axis for double track as a southern bypass of the node of Hanover for freight traffic. The route was planned to become the main axis for goods traffic running east–west. A decision on the plan was expected by 2002. The planning approvals for the three sections of double tracking with a total length of 34 km were issued on 14 November 2001, 12 December 2001 and 24 February 2002.

The financing of the project was resolved at the end of 2007. The federal government would provide €80 million and the state would provide the other €40 million. It was planned to raise the maximum speed of the line to 160 km/h instead of the previous 140 km/h. In January 2009, the federal government announced it would fund €131 million of a total investment of 139 million. Construction would begin in the summer of 2009 and be completed by the end of 2012. In addition, the state of Lower Saxony and Deutsche Bahn would provide part of the funding.

In mid-December 2008, Deutsche Bahn finally notified that it would be calling tenders for the doubling over a length of 34 kilometres. The project package was valued at a total of €100 million (net). On 20 January 2009, the financial agreement for the upgrade was finalised. The symbolic groundbreaking ceremony took place on 23 January 2009. However, Deutsche Bahn did not call tenders until mid-July 2009, with the contract to be awarded from November 2009 and work to be completed by the end of December 2012.

Work finally began on 18 January 2010. The total cost of the upgrade was now stated to be €140 million.

The section between Hildesheim and Hoheneggelsen was put into operation in October 2011. The second section was formally opened on 5 November 2012. The federal government's share of the costs was reported as €137 million. After the completion of the remaining work, two-track operations commenced at the timetable change on 9 December 2012. By eliminating waiting times and the higher line speed, the travel time for local traffic was reduced by up to ten minutes and for long-distance transport by two minutes. In addition to the construction of 34 kilometres of new track, 19 railway bridges were widened, two road and one railway bridge were replaced and a new railway bridge was built over the Salzgitter branch canal. Three new electronic interlockings in Bettmar, Hoheneggelsen and Lengede-Broistedt now control the section of line.

== Operations ==
=== Long distance ===
The route is served every hour by ICE services on the Berlin–Brunswick–Hildesheim–Kassel–Frankfurt–Mannheim Hauptbahnhof–Munich/Basel route. In addition, it is used as a diversion and relief route for the Hanover–Brunswick railway.

=== Regional services ===
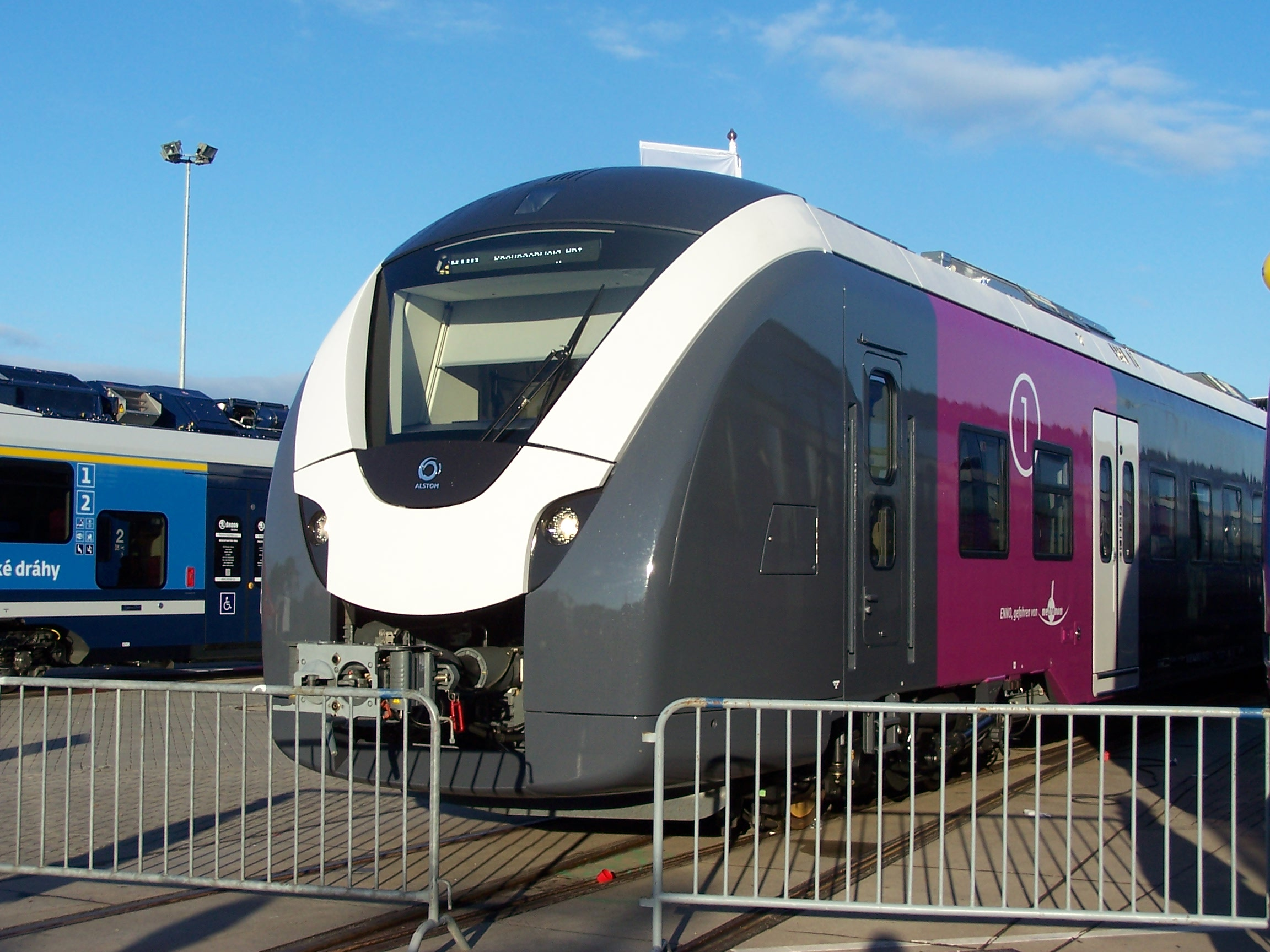
ENNO multiple unit at InnoTrans 2014 in Berlin

The service, which was originally scheduled to run every two hours with additional services during the peak hour, had to be reduced in December 2006 due to the difficult financial situation at the Zweckverband Großraum Braunschweig (Regional Association of Greater Brunswick). For example, until December 2015 there were nine trains from Monday to Friday, five trains on Saturday and five trains on Sundays. Services are still operated at regular intervals, but the timetable has several gaps of three hours. Until 2012, services were operated with Silberling coaches, hauled by class 143 locomotives. Since 9 December 2012, travel times have been reduced from 43 minutes to 33 minutes as a result of the upgrade of the line. Since then, DB Class 628 diesel multiple units have been used.

From December 2015, the regional trains between Hildesheim and Brunswick have run every hour, continuing over the Weddel loop to Wolfsburg. The operation are operated under contract as part of Elektronetzes Niedersachsen-Ost (ENNO—Electric Network of Lower Saxony East) for a term of ten years by the enno Eisenbahngesellschaft (ENNO railway company). It is operated with 20 four-carriage Alstom Coradia Continental electric multiple units manufactured by Linke-Hofmann-Busch (now part of Alstom) by the Zweckverband Großraum Braunschweig, managed as a dedicated pool of rollingstock.
