= Brunswick–Bad Harzburg railway =

Railway line in Germany

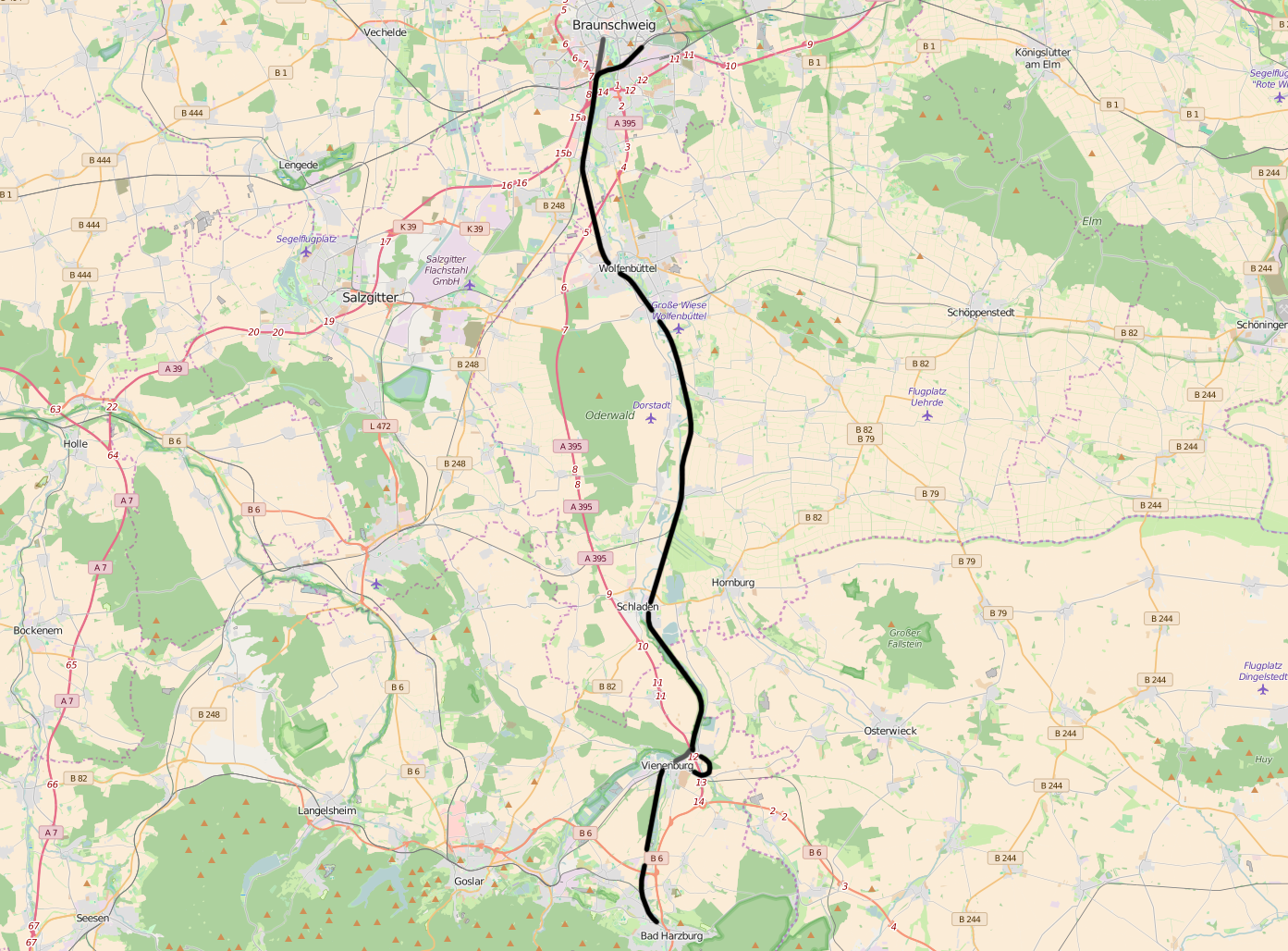

Overview
- Line number: 1901
- Locale: Lower Saxony, Germany

Service
- Route number: 353

Technical
- Line length: 47 km (29 mi)
- Track gauge: 1,435 mm (4 ft 8 1/2 in) standard gauge

The Brunswick–Bad Harzburg railway is a 47 km long German main line railway in the northern foothills of the Harz. It is one of the oldest lines in Germany and the first government-owned railway in Germany.

== History ==
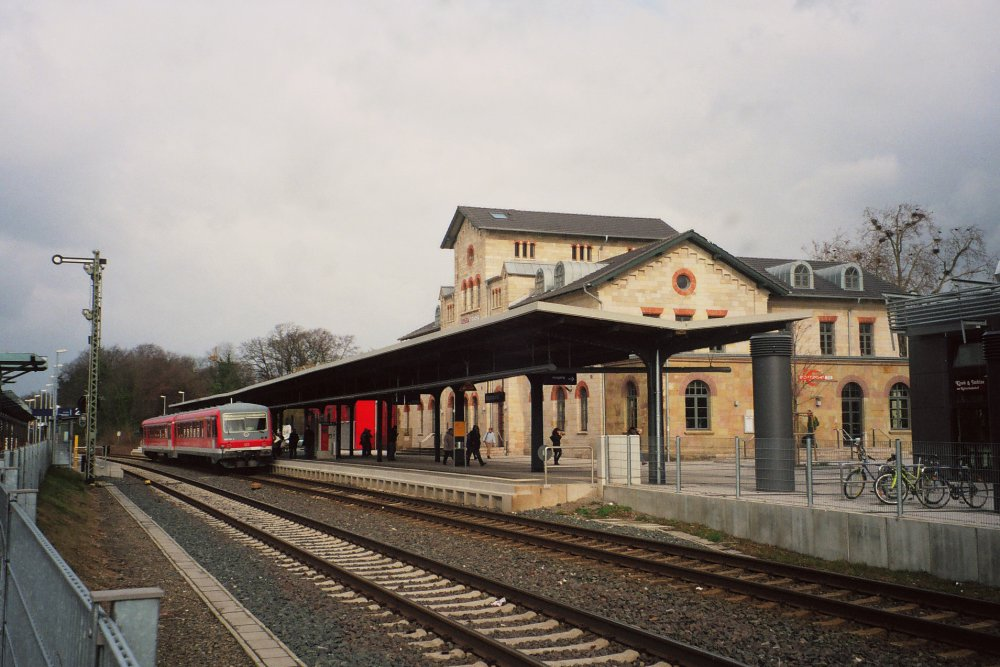
Wolfenbuettel station

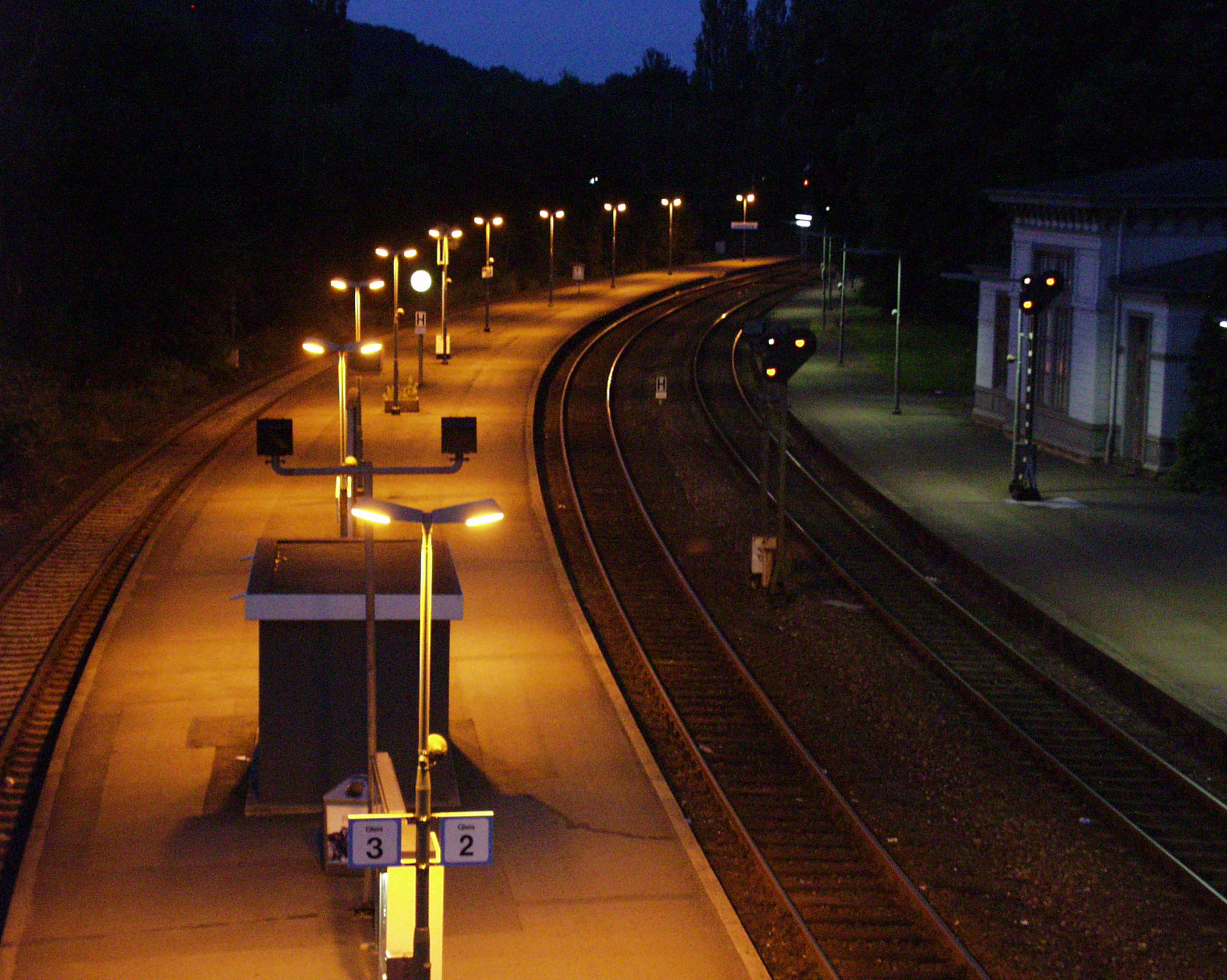
Vienenburg station

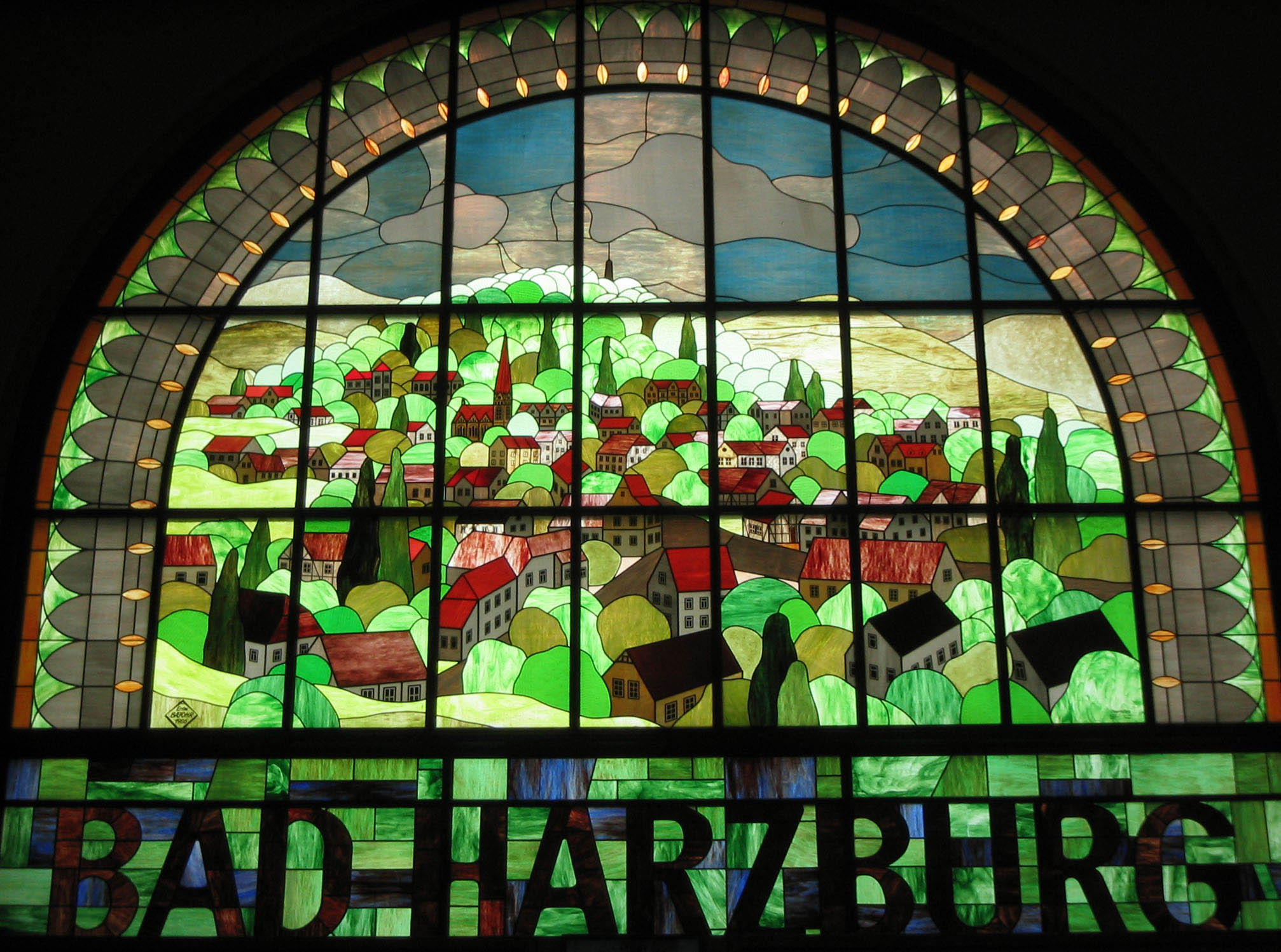
Bad Harzburg station entrance hall window

On 1 December 1838 the first section of the first state railway line in Germany opened between Brunswick (German: Braunschweig) and Wolfenbüttel. It connected the two most important cities in the former Duchy of Brunswick. In 1841 it was extended through Schladen and Vienenburg to Bad Harzburg (then called Neustadt, "New Town"). The steep section between Vienenburg and Bad Harzburg was operated with horse-haulage until 1843.

In 1843 the Wolfenbüttel–Jerxheim–Oschersleben line was opened, which together with the Magdeburg–Halberstadt line formed a connection with Berlin. From 1844, the Brunswick–Hanover line was put into service and east–west traffic ran between Berlin and Hanover via Wolfenbüttel and from 1847 with the opening of the Hanover-Minden line as far as the Ruhr. In 1856 the Brunswick Southern Railway was opened between Börßum and Kreiensen, creating a connection towards Kassel and Frankfurt. 1866 the Vienenburg–Goslar branch was opened, creating the first rail link to the then Hanoverian town of Goslar.

The line lost its significance for long-distance traffic with the completion of the Berlin–Lehrte line in 1871 and the direct Brunswick–Magdeburg line in 1872.

In 1924 the route was deviated to connect to the former Vienenburg marshalling yard.

== Operations ==
Today the line is served mainly by regional passenger services, but has some freight traffic. Regionalbahn trains connect Brunswick and Bad Harzburg and Brunswick and Goslar every two hours, so that north of Vienenburg service run approximately hourly. These are supplemented on some sections by services between Brunswick and Schöppenstedt and there are additional services between Halle, Vienenburg, Bad-Harzburg and Hanover.

The railway is not electrified and north of Vienenburg it is double track.
