= Adelog of Hildesheim =

Bishop of Hildesheim (died 1190)

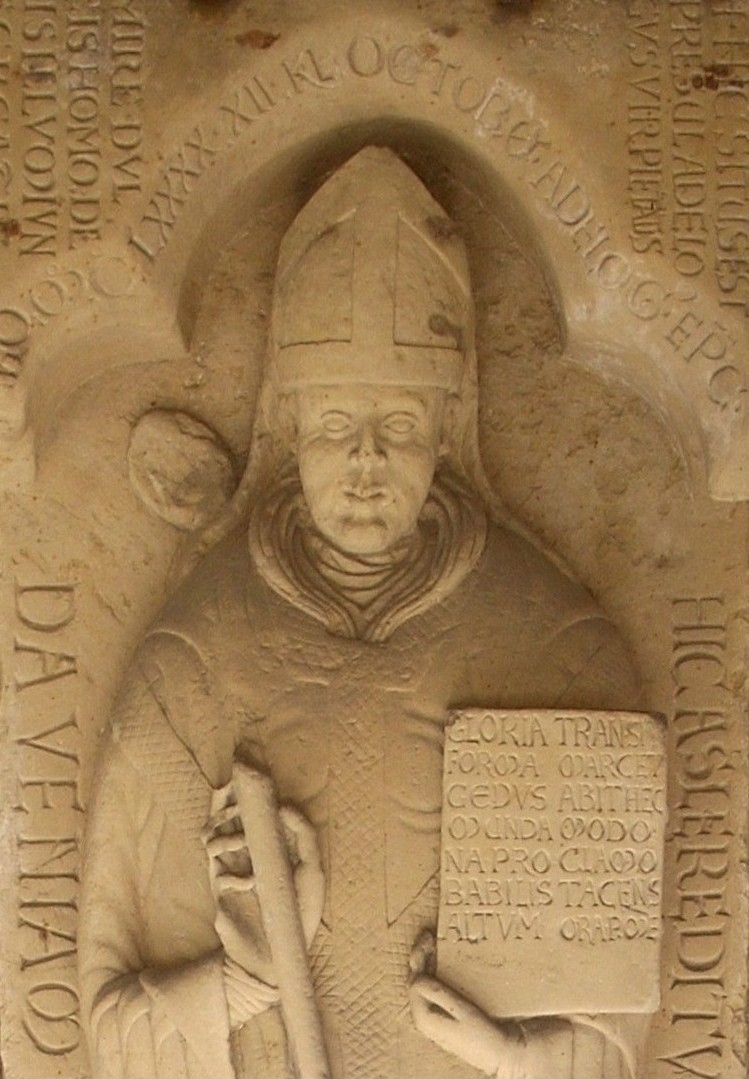
Epitaph, Hildesheim Cathedral

Adelog von Dorstadt (died 20 September 1190) was Bishop of Hildesheim from 1171 until his death.

== Biography ==
Born into a Saxon noble family, he was a relative of the Lords of Dorstadt. From about 1160 he appeared as a canon at Hildesheim Cathedral and provost of the cathedral chapter in Goslar. In the fierce Hohenstaufen–Welf dispute between Frederick Barbarossa and the Saxon duke Henry the Lion, Bishop Adelog acted cautiously and eventually sided with the emperor. When Henry was deposed in 1180, he achieved nearly independent status. Despite the tensions with the House of Welf, he also worked as diocesan bishop in the residence of Brunswick.

Adelog was a builder, overseeing the reconstruction of the St. Michael's Church, Hildesheim after the fire of 1186, the completion of the basilica St. Godehard, Hildesheim, and the construction of the Neuwerk monastery in Goslar. He also sponsored construction of the Our Lady Altar in Brunswick Cathedral, which he consecrated on 8 September 1188 in the presence of Henry the Lion, and in 1189 he confirmed and privileged the foundation of an Augustinian nunnery in Dorstadt.

He died 20 September 1190 in Hildesheim and was buried in the Hildesheim Cathedral Adelogs grave in the nave of the cathedral is made of ornate sandstone.

Adelog of Dorstadt Born: 12th century Died: 20 September 1190
Catholic Church titles
Regnal titles
| Preceded by Herrmann of Wennerde | Bishop of Hildesheim; 1171–1190 | Succeeded by Berno |
