= Hildesheim loop =

Coordinates: 52°09′23″N 9°52′05″E

Overview
- Native name: Hildesheimer Schleife
- Locale: Lower Saxony, Germany

Service
- Route number: 1774

Technical
- Line length: 3.7 km (2.3 mi)
- Number of tracks: 1
- Track gauge: 1,435 mm (4 ft 8 1/2 in) standard gauge
- Electrification: 15 kV/16.7 Hz AC overhead catenary
- Operating speed: 130 km/h (81 mph) (maximum)

The Hildesheim loop (German: Hildesheimer Schleife), also known as the Sorsum curve or the Hildesheim curve, is a 3.7 km long German passenger railway. It is single-track and electrified throughout. The line was opened in 1991.

== Route ==
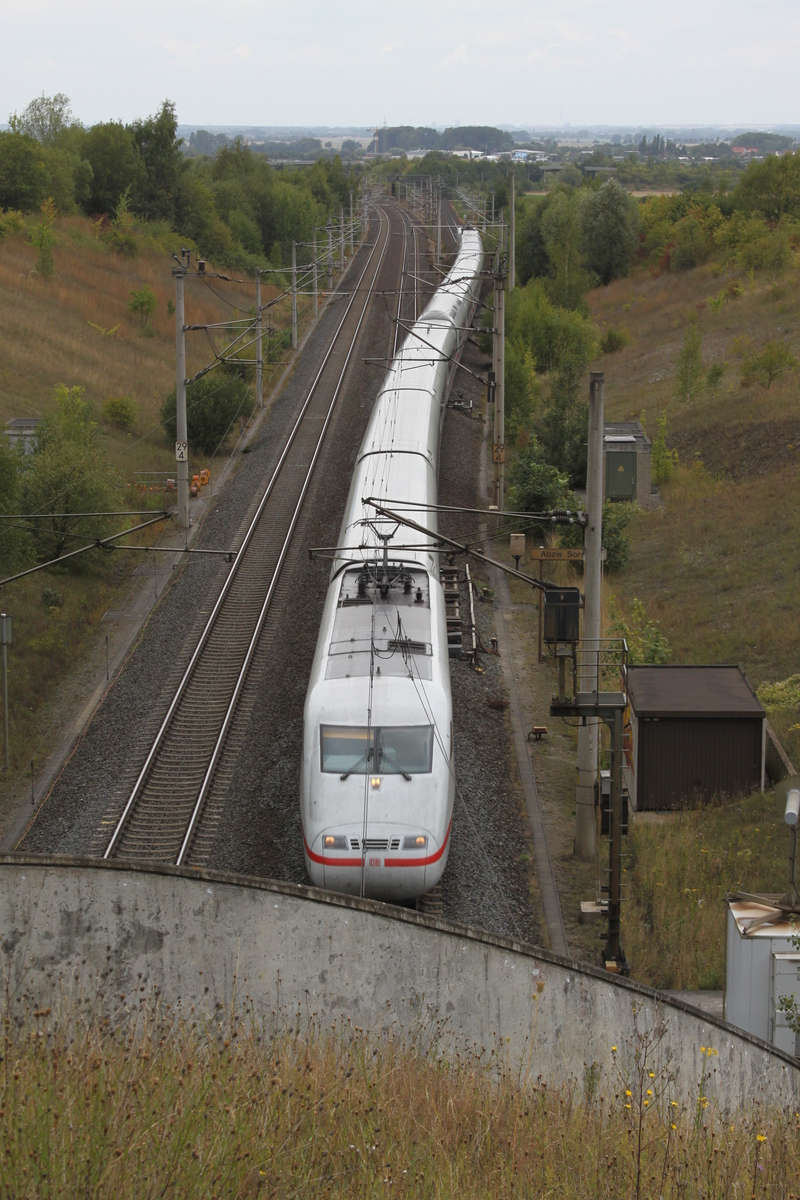
An ICE train running south off the loop on to the HSL

The southern end of the line branches off the Hanover–Würzburg high-speed line at Sorsum junction, 29.5 km south of Hanover. The loop leaves running northeast from the HSL, which is running to the northwest. At Himmelsthür junction, 4.7 km west of Hildesheim, it connects with the double-track line from Hanover and Nordstemmen to Hildesheim, which runs east–west, at the 45.4 km mark. There is a down grade towards Hildesheim.

The line connects the high-speed line with Hildesheim station, conveying Intercity-Express trains running between Frankfurt am Main and Berlin. ICE trains run from Hildesheim to Brunswick and the Weddel loop to Wolfsburg and Berlin via the Hanover–Berlin high-speed line. During the day, trains run hourly both ways on the loop.
