= Ohrum =

- Municipality
- Location of Ohrum within Wolfenbüttel district
- Interactive map of Ohrum
- Location within Germany Location within Lower Saxony
- Coordinates: 52°07′16″N 10°33′52″E
- Country: Germany
- State: Lower Saxony
- District: Wolfenbüttel
- Municipal assoc.: Oderwald

Government
  - Mayor: Uwe Kalb (SPD)

Area
  - Total: 8.38 km^{2} (3.24 sq mi)
- Elevation: 82 m (269 ft)

Population (2025-12-31)
  - Total: 616
  - Density: 73.5/km^{2} (190/sq mi)
- Time zone: UTC+01:00 (CET)
  - Summer (DST): UTC+02:00 (CEST)
- Postal codes: 38312
- Dialling codes: 05337
- Vehicle registration: WF
- Website: www.sg-oderwald.de

Ohrum is a municipality in the district of Wolfenbüttel, in Lower Saxony, Germany.
