= Heiningen, Lower Saxony =

Heiningen
- Municipality
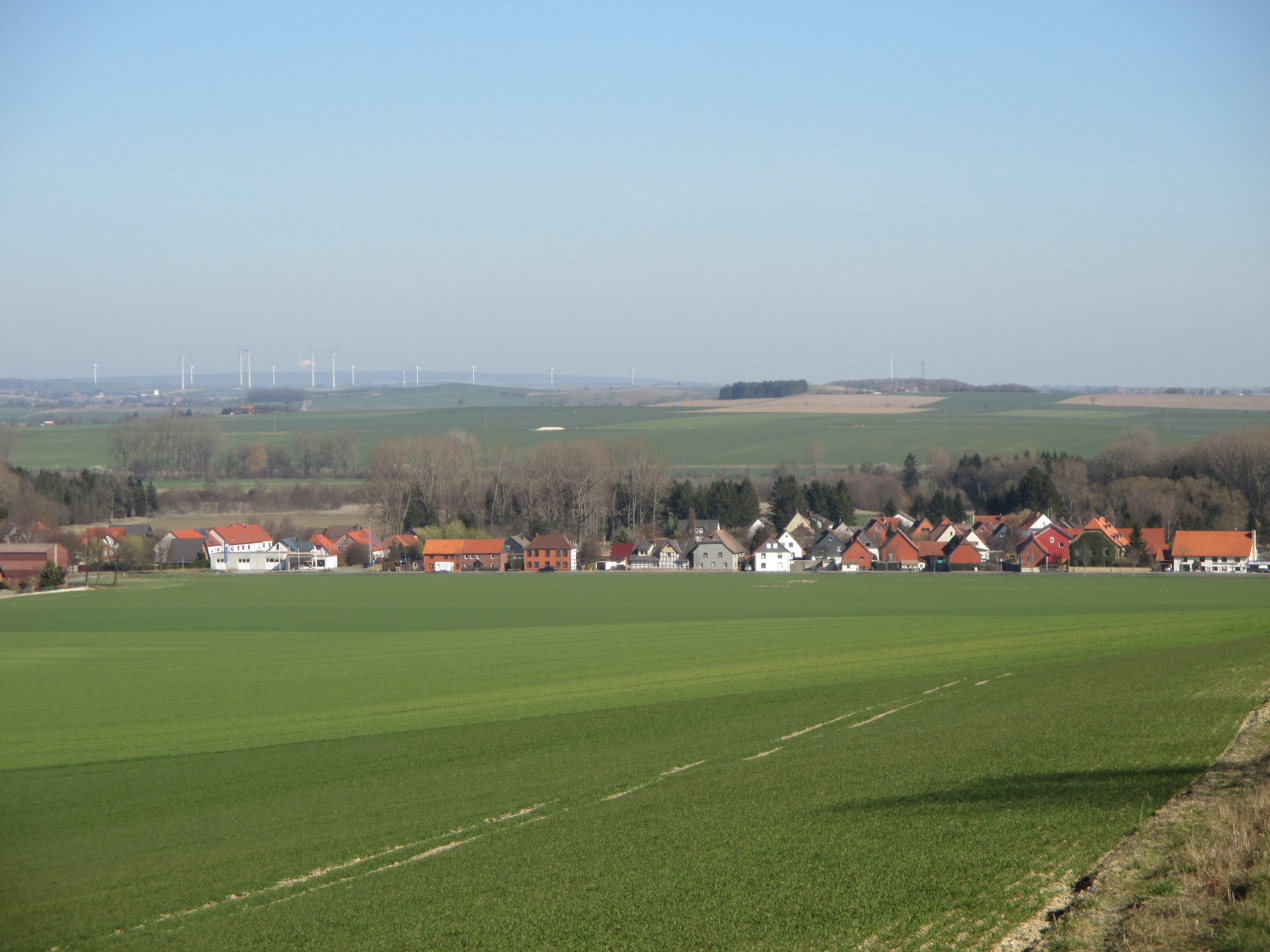

- Location of Heiningen within Wolfenbüttel district
- Interactive map of Heiningen
- Location within Germany Location within Lower Saxony
- Coordinates: 52°04′N 10°34′E
- Country: Germany
- State: Lower Saxony
- District: Wolfenbüttel
- Municipal assoc.: Oderwald

Government
  - Mayor: Andreas Niebuhr (SPD)

Area
  - Total: 8.41 km^{2} (3.25 sq mi)
- Elevation: 101 m (331 ft)

Population (2025-12-31)
  - Total: 688
  - Density: 81.8/km^{2} (212/sq mi)
- Time zone: UTC+01:00 (CET)
  - Summer (DST): UTC+02:00 (CEST)
- Postal codes: 38312
- Dialling codes: 05334
- Vehicle registration: WF

Heiningen (German pronunciation: [ˈhaɪnɪŋən]) is a municipality in the district of Wolfenbüttel, in Lower Saxony, Germany. It is part of the Samtgemeinde ("collective municipality") Oderwald.

== Geography ==
Heiningen is located on the southeastern rim of the Oderwald hill range, about 11 kilometres (6.8 mi) south of the district capital Wolfenbüttel. It has access to the BAB 395 motorway at the nearby Flöthe junction.

== History ==
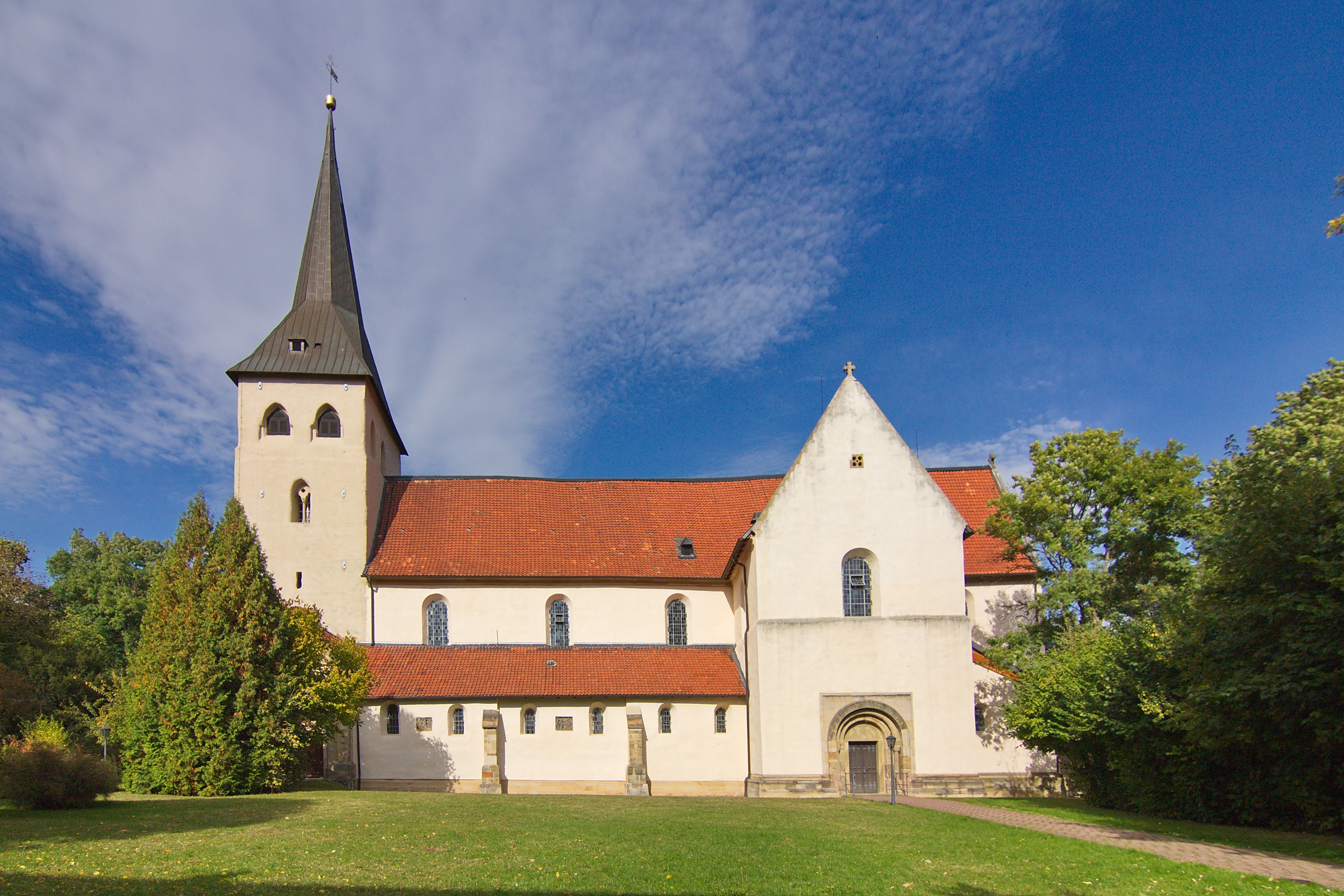
Sts Peter and Paul Church

The municipality is the site of medieval Heiningen Abbey, established about 1000 AD by the Saxon noble House of Billung. Promoted by Bishop Bernward of Hildesheim, the canonesses even received immediacy by Emperor Otto III. The Rule of St. Augustine was implemented in 1126, while the building of the Sts Peter and Paul monastery church, a Romanesque basilica, began. Heiningen became the seat of an archdeacon in 1174. In the 15th century, the abbey was affiliated with the Congregation of Windesheim.

After the fierce Hildesheim Stift Feud, Heiningen was occupied by the forces of Duke Henry V of Brunswick and the monastery turned Protestant in 1569. Restored to the Bishopric of Hildesheim in 1643, the abbey church again was consecrated Catholic, while the population largely retained the Protestant faith. The convent was finally secularized in 1810, though the monastery church remained the centre of a Catholic parish up to today. Joseph Müller (1894–1944), a member of the German Resistance to Nazism, served here as priest from 1937 to 1943.

== Politics ==
Seats in the municipal assembly (Gemeinderat) as of 2011 elections:

- Social Democratic Party of Germany (SPD): 5
- Free Voters: 4
- Christian Democratic Union of Germany (CDU): 1
