= Oderwald =

- Samtgemeinde
- Coat of arms

- Location of Oderwald within Wolfenbüttel district
- Interactive map of Oderwald
- Location within Germany Location within Lower Saxony
- Coordinates: 52°04′N 10°35′E
- Country: Germany
- State: Lower Saxony
- District: Wolfenbüttel
- Subdivisions: 6 municipalities

Area
  - Total: 89.04 km^{2} (34.38 sq mi)

Population (2025-12-31)
  - Total: 6,725
  - Density: 75.53/km^{2} (195.6/sq mi)
- Time zone: UTC+01:00 (CET)
  - Summer (DST): UTC+02:00 (CEST)
- Vehicle registration: WF
- Website: www.samtgemeinde-oderwald.de

Oderwald is a Samtgemeinde ("collective municipality") in the district of Wolfenbüttel, in Lower Saxony, Germany. It is situated along the river Oker, approx. 10 km south of Wolfenbüttel. It is named after the Oderwald, a small chain of hills in the municipality. Its seat is in the village Börßum.

The Samtgemeinde Oderwald consists of the following municipalities:

1. Börßum
2. Cramme
3. Dorstadt
4. Flöthe
5. Heiningen
6. Ohrum
