= Fuhse =

River in Germany

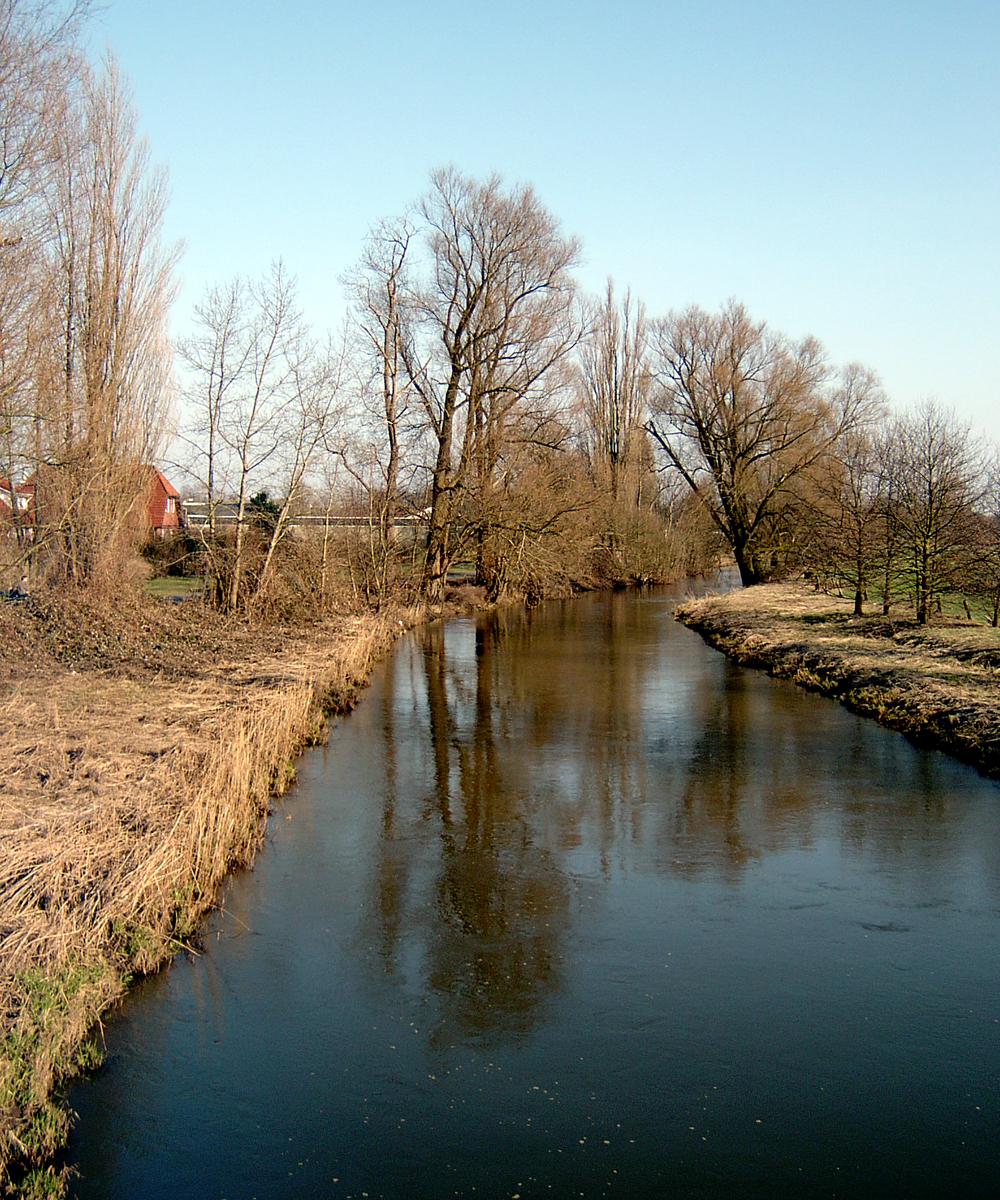

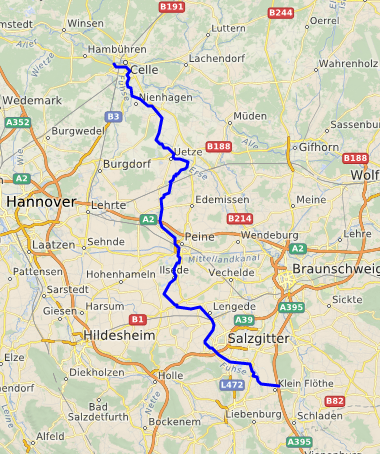

Location
- Country: Germany
- State: Lower Saxony

Physical characteristics
- Source
  - location: Oderwald
  - elevation: 150 m (490 ft)
- Mouth
  - location: Aller
  - coordinates: 52°37′20″N 10°2′56″E
- Length: 94.6 km (58.8 mi)
- Basin size: 921 km^{2} (356 sq mi)

Basin features
- Progression: Aller→ Weser→ North Sea

The Fuhse is a river of Lower Saxony, Germany, a left tributary of the Aller.

Spelled Fuse in maps of the 19th century and earlier, the name is thought to derive from the ancient Fosa flumen, after which the Germanic tribe of the Fosi took their name (or vice versa).

The Fuhse originates on the west slope of the Oderwald, foothills of the Harz range between Bad Harzburg und Wolfenbüttel. The source spring lies in the municipality of Flöthe near Schladen. From there the Fuhse flows west of Salzgitter. It turns to the north and flows through Peine, Dollbergen and Uetze to Celle. In Celle (borough Neustadt) it joins the Aller. The most important tributary is the Erse, that joins the Fuhse at Uetze.

== See also ==
- List of rivers of Lower Saxony
