= Flöthe =

- Municipality
- Location of Flöthe within Wolfenbüttel district
- Interactive map of Flöthe
- Location within Germany Location within Lower Saxony
- Coordinates: 52°05′N 10°29′E
- Country: Germany
- State: Lower Saxony
- District: Wolfenbüttel
- Municipal assoc.: Oderwald
- Subdivisions: 2 Ortsteile

Government
  - Mayor: Hans-Dieter Bassy

Area
  - Total: 18.84 km^{2} (7.27 sq mi)
- Elevation: 137 m (449 ft)

Population (2025-12-31)
  - Total: 1,081
  - Density: 57.38/km^{2} (148.6/sq mi)
- Time zone: UTC+01:00 (CET)
  - Summer (DST): UTC+02:00 (CEST)
- Postal codes: 38312
- Dialling codes: 05341
- Vehicle registration: WF

Flöthe is a municipality in the district of Wolfenbüttel, in Lower Saxony, Germany. Flöthe has a population of 1,120 people as of 2015.
