= Börßum =

- Municipality
- Coat of arms

- Location of Börßum within Wolfenbüttel district
- Interactive map of Börßum
- Location within Germany Location within Lower Saxony
- Coordinates: 52°04′N 10°34′E
- Country: Germany
- State: Lower Saxony
- District: Wolfenbüttel
- Municipal assoc.: Oderwald

Government
  - Mayor: Andreas Hauenschild

Area
  - Total: 30.74 km^{2} (11.87 sq mi)
- Elevation: 88 m (289 ft)

Population (2025-12-31)
  - Total: 2,810
  - Density: 91.4/km^{2} (237/sq mi)
- Time zone: UTC+01:00 (CET)
  - Summer (DST): UTC+02:00 (CEST)
- Postal codes: 38312
- Dialling codes: 05334
- Vehicle registration: WF

Börßum is a municipality in the district of Wolfenbüttel, in Lower Saxony, Germany.

== Geography ==
Börßum lies only a few kilometers north of the Harz Mountains, north of Schladen, on the east bank of the Oker, 11 km south of Wolfenbüttel. It is not far southeast of the Oderwald.

Parts of its municipality are Börßum, Achim, Bornum, Kalme and Seinstedt.

== History ==
Börßum already had a lot of names: 1135 Borsne, 1310 Borssen, 1338 Borssem, 1422 Groß Borsem, 1581 Borsum, 1652 Börsumb, around 1770 Borsheim, 1765 Boersheim, since 1762 Börßum.

On November 1, 2011, the municipality of Achim was incorporated into Börßum.

== Incorporations ==
- 1 November 2011: Incorporation of the municipality of Achim which included Kalme und Seinstedt
- 1 March 1974: Bornum

== Religion ==
In Börßum there is the Protestant Peter-und-Paul-Kirche, the parish belongs to the parish association Börßum-Achim-Bornum of the provostry Schöppenstedt.

In 1954, the Catholic Curacy of Börßum was founded by the merge of the two parochial vicariates of Hornburg and Semmenstedt. In 1959/60 the Catholic church of St. Bernward was built. In 2011, the church was desecrated, most recently it belonged to the parish of St. Petrus in Wolfenbüttel. Today, the nearest Catholic church is in Heiningen, two kilometres away.

== Economy and infrastructure ==
Börßum offers a primary school (built 1899, rebuilt 2002/03), a kindergarten, two doctors, a pharmacy, a pub, an optician, restaurants and since 2009 a diner. Furthermore, many sports activities (football, basketball, etc.) are offered.

An Edeka market has been under construction since 2021, which is due to be completed in 2022.

== Transport ==
Börßum has a passenger stop, which (as of February 2022) is served hourly. Historically, Börßum was also a regionally important railway junction.
